= Coleoxestia pubicornis =

Scientific classification
- Kingdom: Animalia
- Phylum: Arthropoda
- Class: Insecta
- Order: Coleoptera
- Suborder: Polyphaga
- Infraorder: Cucujiformia
- Family: Cerambycidae
- Subfamily: Cerambycinae
- Tribe: Cerambycini
- Genus: Coleoxestia
- Species: C. pubicornis

Binomial name
- Coleoxestia pubicornis (Gounelle, 1909)

Synonyms
- Xestia pubicornis Carvalho & Carvalho, 1939

Species of beetle

Coleoxestia pubicornis is a species in the longhorn beetle family Cerambycidae. It is found in Brazil and Bolivia.
