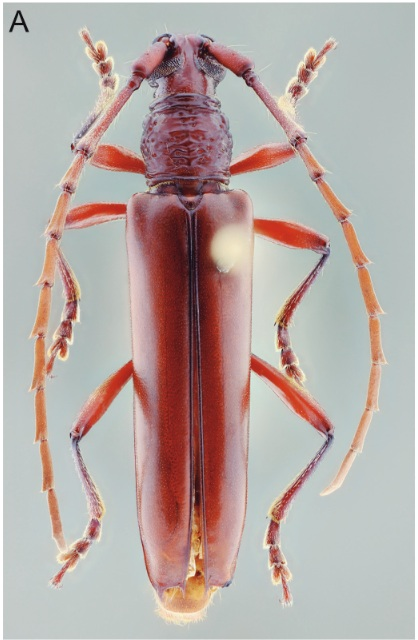

Scientific classification
- Kingdom: Animalia
- Phylum: Arthropoda
- Clade: Pancrustacea
- Class: Insecta
- Order: Coleoptera
- Suborder: Polyphaga
- Infraorder: Cucujiformia
- Family: Cerambycidae
- Subfamily: Cerambycinae
- Tribe: Cerambycini
- Genus: Coleoxestia
- Species: C. vittata

Binomial name
- Coleoxestia vittata (Thomson, 1861)

Synonyms
- Coleoxestia confusa Blackwelder, 1946; Coleoxestia longipennis Fragoso, 1982; Xestia confusa Gahan, 1892; Xestia longipennis Gahan, 1892; Xestia vittata Gemminger & Harold, 1872

= Coleoxestia vittata =

Species of beetle

Coleoxestia vittata is a species in the longhorn beetle family Cerambycidae. It is found in Honduras, Brazil, Paraguay, Panama, Costa Rica, Bolivia, Argentina, and Guatemala.
