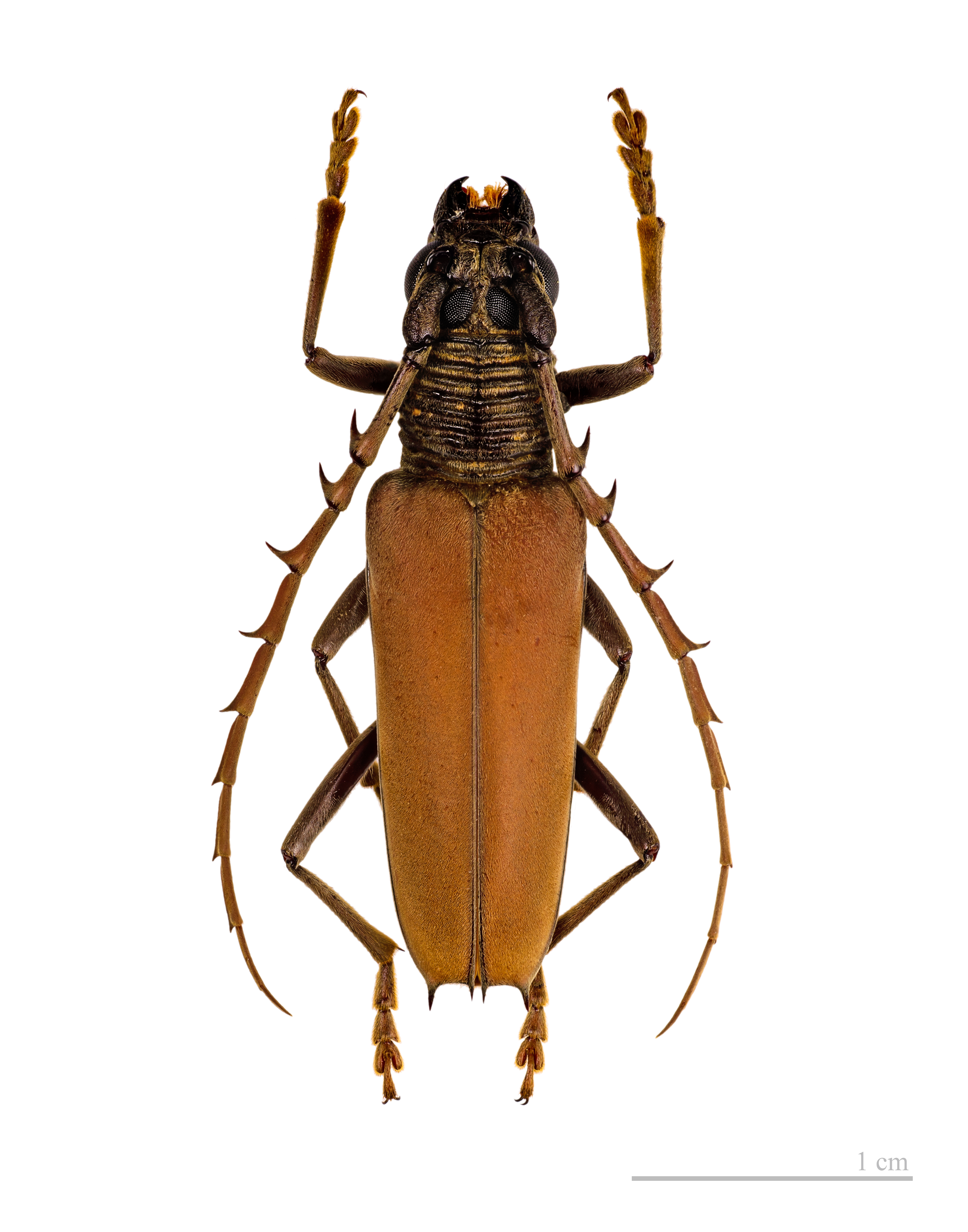

Scientific classification
- Domain: Eukaryota
- Kingdom: Animalia
- Phylum: Arthropoda
- Class: Insecta
- Order: Coleoptera
- Suborder: Polyphaga
- Infraorder: Cucujiformia
- Family: Cerambycidae
- Subfamily: Cerambycinae
- Tribe: Cerambycini
- Genus: Atiaia
- Species: A. consobrina

Binomial name
- Atiaia consobrina (Gahan, 1892)

Synonyms
- Brasilianus consobrinus Monné & Giesbert, 1994; Hamaticherus consobrinus Aurivillius, 1912; Hammatichaerus consobrinus Gounelle, 1906; Hammaticherus consobrinus Gahan, 1892

= Atiaia consobrina =

Species of beetle

Atiaia consobrina is a species in the longhorn beetle family Cerambycidae. It is found in Venezuela, Brazil, French Guiana, and Suriname.
