= Coleoxestia striatepunctata =

Scientific classification
- Kingdom: Animalia
- Phylum: Arthropoda
- Class: Insecta
- Order: Coleoptera
- Suborder: Polyphaga
- Infraorder: Cucujiformia
- Family: Cerambycidae
- Subfamily: Cerambycinae
- Tribe: Cerambycini
- Genus: Coleoxestia
- Species: C. striatepunctata

Binomial name
- Coleoxestia striatepunctata Eya & Chemsak, 2005

Species of beetle

Coleoxestia striatepunctata is a species in the longhorn beetle family Cerambycidae. It is found in Panama.
