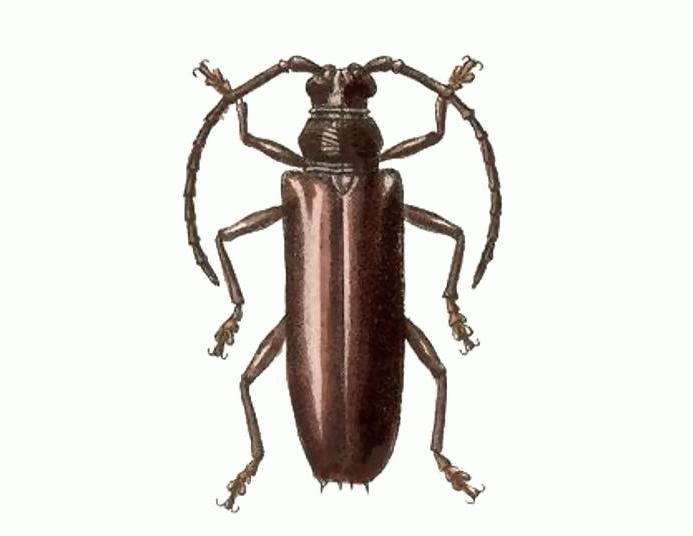
- Coleoxestia nitida

Scientific classification
- Kingdom: Animalia
- Phylum: Arthropoda
- Class: Insecta
- Order: Coleoptera
- Suborder: Polyphaga
- Infraorder: Cucujiformia
- Family: Cerambycidae
- Subfamily: Cerambycinae
- Tribe: Cerambycini
- Genus: Coleoxestia
- Species: C. nitida

Binomial name
- Coleoxestia nitida (Bates, 1872)

Synonyms
- Xestia nitida Gemminger & Harold, 1872

= Coleoxestia nitida =

Species of beetle

Coleoxestia nitida is a species in the longhorn beetle family Cerambycidae. It is found in Brazil, Colombia, Costa Rica, Guatemala, Honduras, Mexico, Nicaragua, Panama, and South America.
