= Sphallambyx superbum =

Scientific classification
- Domain: Eukaryota
- Kingdom: Animalia
- Phylum: Arthropoda
- Class: Insecta
- Order: Coleoptera
- Suborder: Polyphaga
- Infraorder: Cucujiformia
- Family: Cerambycidae
- Subfamily: Cerambycinae
- Tribe: Cerambycini
- Genus: Sphallambyx
- Species: S. superbum

Binomial name
- Sphallambyx superbum (Aurivillius, 1910)

Synonyms
- Sphallenum superbum Blackwelder, 1946

Species of beetle

Sphallambyx superbum is a species in the longhorn beetle family Cerambycidae. It is found in Peru, Ecuador, Bolivia, Brazil, and Colombia.

This species was described by Per Olof Christopher Aurivillius in 1910.
