= Sphallambyx mexicanum =

Scientific classification
- Domain: Eukaryota
- Kingdom: Animalia
- Phylum: Arthropoda
- Class: Insecta
- Order: Coleoptera
- Suborder: Polyphaga
- Infraorder: Cucujiformia
- Family: Cerambycidae
- Subfamily: Cerambycinae
- Tribe: Cerambycini
- Genus: Sphallambyx
- Species: S. mexicanum

Binomial name
- Sphallambyx mexicanum Galileo & Martins, 2007

Species of beetle

Sphallambyx mexicanum is a species in the longhorn beetle family Cerambycidae. It is found in Mexico.
