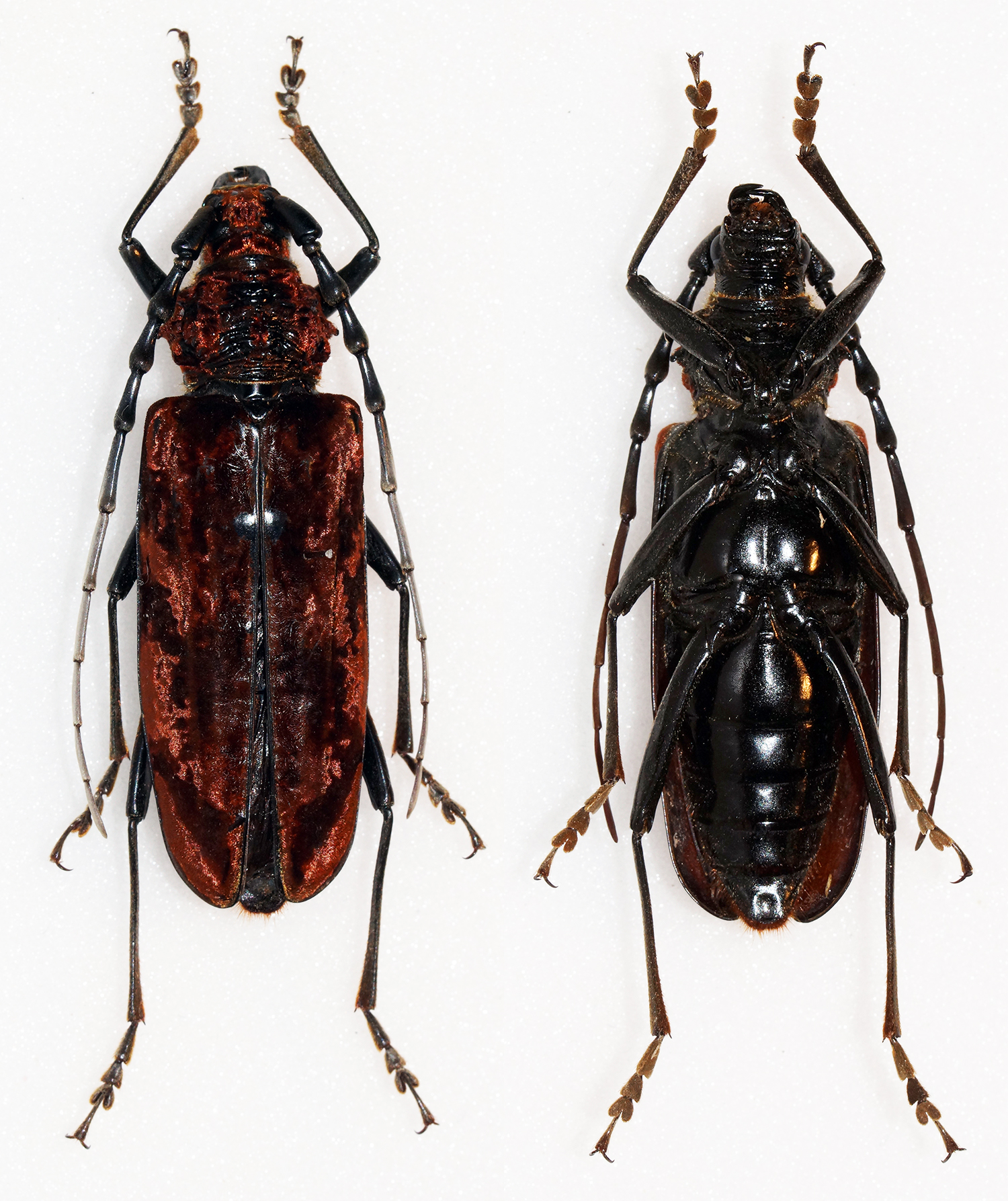

Scientific classification
- Kingdom: Animalia
- Phylum: Arthropoda
- Class: Insecta
- Order: Coleoptera
- Suborder: Polyphaga
- Infraorder: Cucujiformia
- Family: Cerambycidae
- Subfamily: Cerambycinae
- Tribe: Cerambycini
- Genus: Hemadius; Fairmaire, 1889
- Species: H. oenochrous

Binomial name
- Hemadius oenochrous Fairmaire, 1889

Synonyms
- Neocerambyx oenochrousHemadius oenochrous Fairmaire, 1889; Aeolesthes oenochrous (Fairmaire, 1889); Hemadius oenochroa (Fairmaire, 1889) (misspelling)

= Hemadius =

Species of beetle

Hemadius is a monotypic genus of longhorn beetles, containing the species Hemadius oenochrous in the tribe Cerambycini and previously placed in the genus Neocerambyx. It is native to Asia, where it occurs in China, Vietnam, Laos, and Taiwan. It is known commonly as the cherry tree longhorned beetle and Wushe blood-spotted longhorned beetle.

This beetle is about 4.5 to 6.5 centimeters long with a narrow body. It is black with a red sheen. The male has antennae longer than its body length; the female has shorter antennae.

This beetle lives in forests, where it specializes on cherry and peach trees (Prunus spp.).
