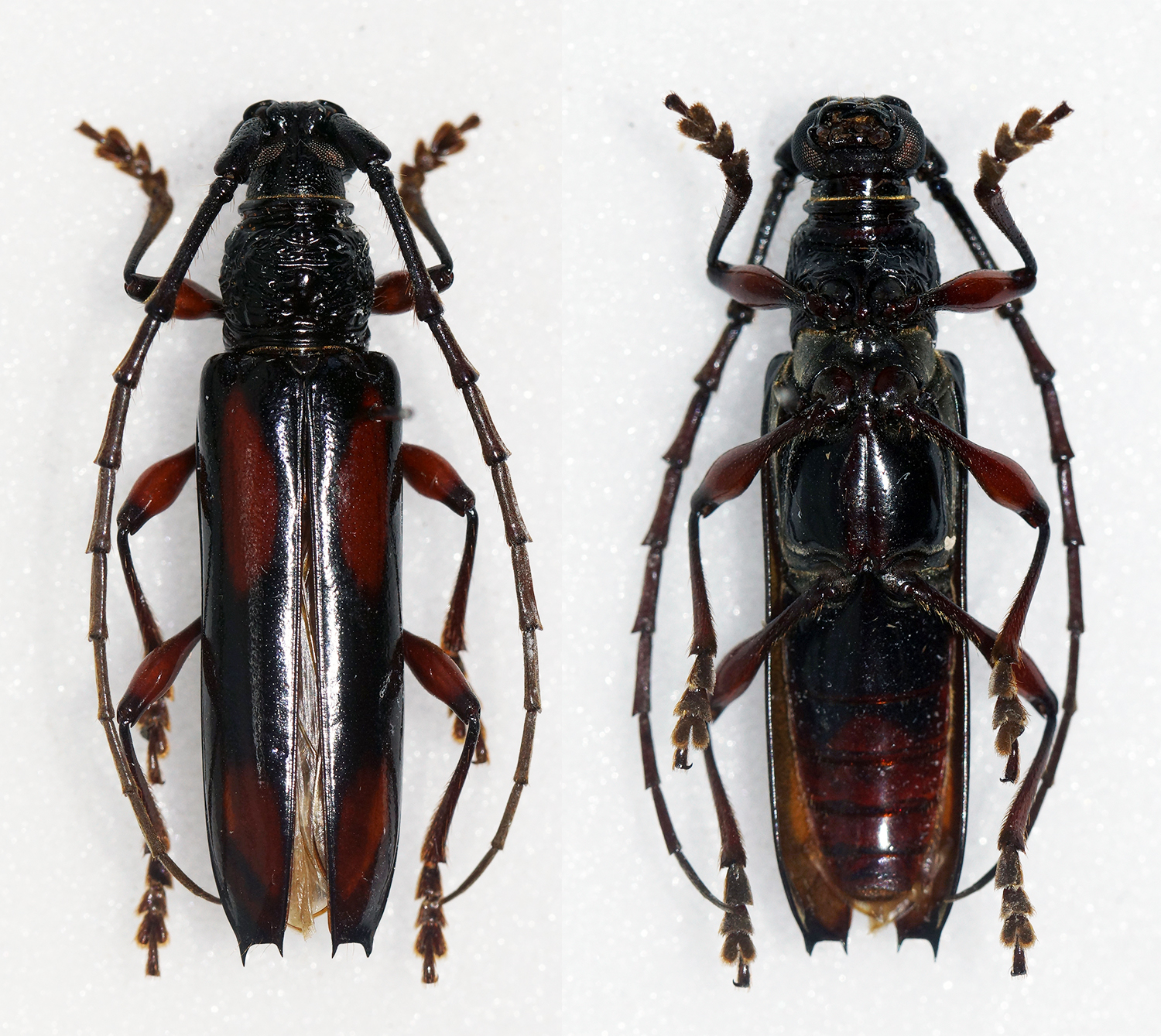
- Coleoxestia rubromaculata

Scientific classification
- Kingdom: Animalia
- Phylum: Arthropoda
- Class: Insecta
- Order: Coleoptera
- Suborder: Polyphaga
- Infraorder: Cucujiformia
- Family: Cerambycidae
- Subfamily: Cerambycinae
- Tribe: Cerambycini
- Genus: Coleoxestia
- Species: C. rubromaculata

Binomial name
- Coleoxestia rubromaculata (Gounelle, 1909)

Synonyms
- Coleoxestia bimaculata Fuchs, 1955; Xestia rubro-maculata Gounelle, 1909

= Coleoxestia rubromaculata =

Species of beetle

Coleoxestia rubromaculata is a species in the longhorn beetle family Cerambycidae. It is found in Brazil, Colombia, Costa Rica, Ecuador, Honduras, Nicaragua, Panama, and South America.
