= Sphallambyx chabrillacii =

Scientific classification
- Domain: Eukaryota
- Kingdom: Animalia
- Phylum: Arthropoda
- Class: Insecta
- Order: Coleoptera
- Suborder: Polyphaga
- Infraorder: Cucujiformia
- Family: Cerambycidae
- Subfamily: Cerambycinae
- Tribe: Cerambycini
- Genus: Sphallambyx
- Species: S. chabrillacii

Binomial name
- Sphallambyx chabrillacii (Thomson, 1857)

Synonyms
- Criodion chabrillaci Gemminger & Harold, 1872; Criodion chabrillacii Thomson, 1861; Criodion toledo-pizai Zikán & Wygodzinsky, 1948; Sphallambyx chabrillaci Monné & Giesbert, 1994; Xestia chabrillacii Thomson, 1857

Species of beetle

Sphallambyx chabrillacii is a species in the longhorn beetle family Cerambycidae. It is found in Costa Rica and Brazil.
