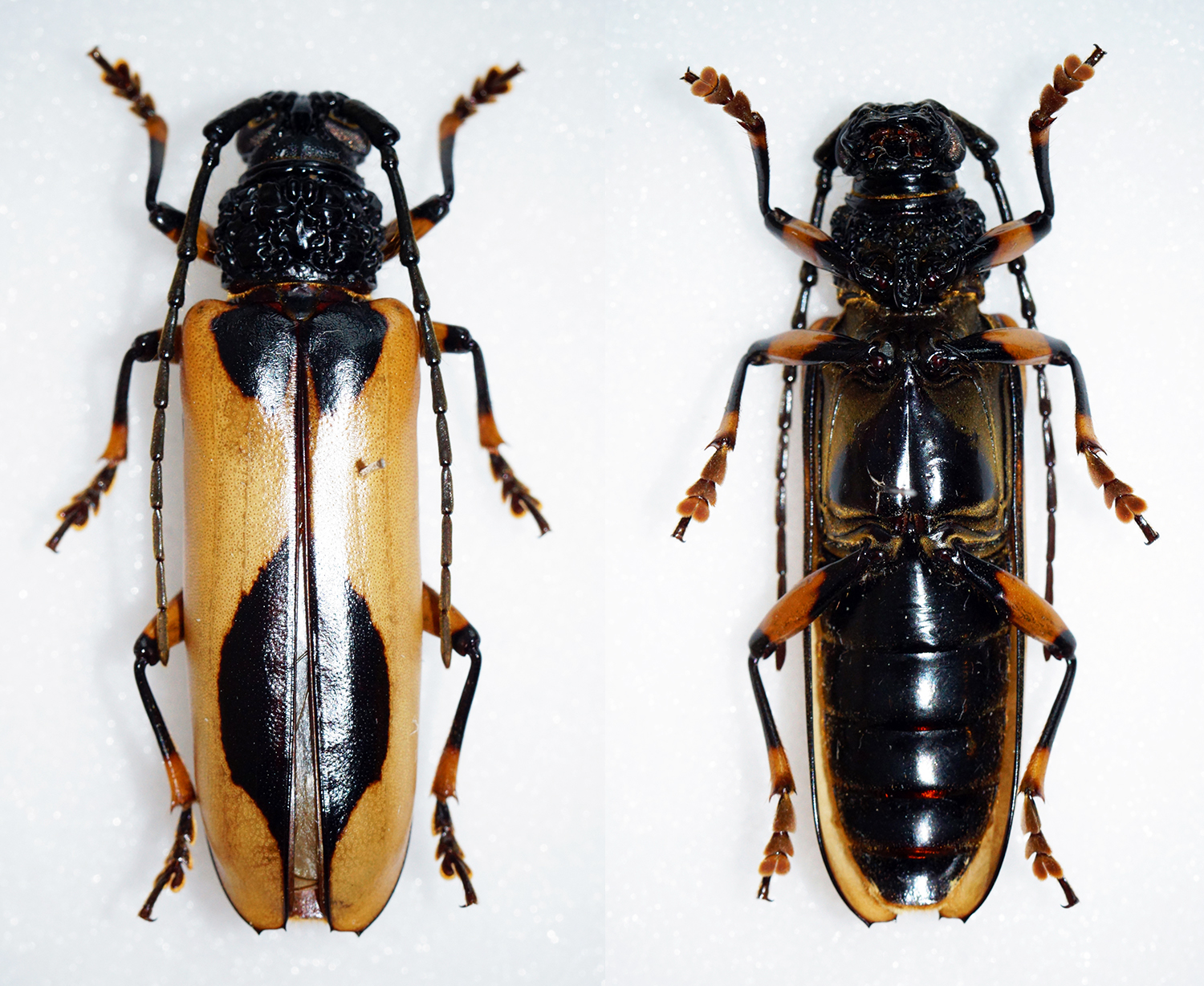

Scientific classification
- Domain: Eukaryota
- Kingdom: Animalia
- Phylum: Arthropoda
- Class: Insecta
- Order: Coleoptera
- Suborder: Polyphaga
- Infraorder: Cucujiformia
- Family: Cerambycidae
- Subfamily: Cerambycinae
- Tribe: Cerambycini
- Subtribe: Sphallotrichina
- Genus: Metacriodion
- Species: M. pictum

Binomial name
- Metacriodion pictum (Waterhouse, 1880)

Synonyms
- Criodion pictum Aurivillius, 1912

= Metacriodion pictum =

Species of beetle

Metacriodion pictum is a species in the longhorn beetle family Cerambycidae. It is found in Ecuador, French Guiana, Bolivia, and Peru.
