= Coleoxestia rufosemivittata =

Scientific classification
- Kingdom: Animalia
- Phylum: Arthropoda
- Class: Insecta
- Order: Coleoptera
- Suborder: Polyphaga
- Infraorder: Cucujiformia
- Family: Cerambycidae
- Subfamily: Cerambycinae
- Tribe: Cerambycini
- Genus: Coleoxestia
- Species: C. rufosemivittata

Binomial name
- Coleoxestia rufosemivittata Tippmann, 1960

Species of beetle

Coleoxestia rufosemivittata is a species in the longhorn beetle family Cerambycidae. It is found in Bolivia.
