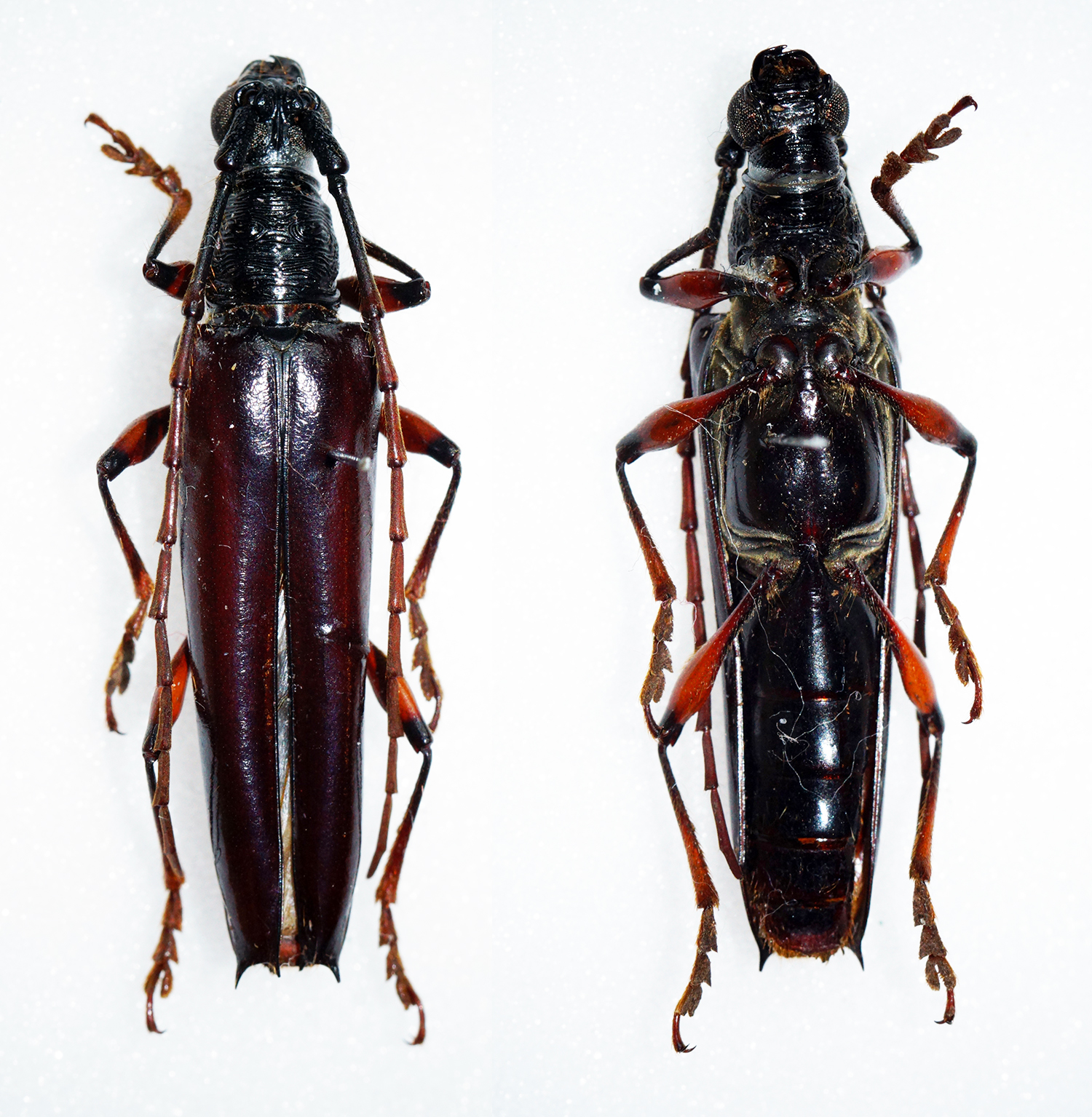

Scientific classification
- Kingdom: Animalia
- Phylum: Arthropoda
- Class: Insecta
- Order: Coleoptera
- Suborder: Polyphaga
- Infraorder: Cucujiformia
- Family: Cerambycidae
- Subfamily: Cerambycinae
- Tribe: Cerambycini
- Genus: Coleoxestia
- Species: C. sanguinipes

Binomial name
- Coleoxestia sanguinipes (Bates, 1884)

Synonyms
- Coleoxestia sanguinipenis Chemsak, Linsley & Noguera, 1992; Xestia sanguinipes Bates, 1884

= Coleoxestia sanguinipes =

Species of beetle

Coleoxestia sanguinipes is a species in the longhorn beetle family Cerambycidae. It is found in Nicaragua, Panama, Venezuela, Ecuador, Colombia, Costa Rica, and Honduras.
