= Ochrodion quadrimaculatum =

Scientific classification
- Kingdom: Animalia
- Phylum: Arthropoda
- Class: Insecta
- Order: Coleoptera
- Suborder: Polyphaga
- Infraorder: Cucujiformia
- Family: Cerambycidae
- Subfamily: Cerambycinae
- Tribe: Cerambycini
- Subtribe: Sphallotrichina
- Genus: Ochrodion
- Species: O. quadrimaculatum

Binomial name
- Ochrodion quadrimaculatum (Gahan, 1892)

Synonyms
- Criodion quadrimaculatum Blackwelder, 1946; Criodion quadrimaculatus Zajciw & Campos-Seabra, 1968

Species of beetle

Ochrodion quadrimaculatum is a species in the longhorn beetle family Cerambycidae. It is found in Brazil.
