= Coleoxestia ebenina =

Scientific classification
- Kingdom: Animalia
- Phylum: Arthropoda
- Class: Insecta
- Order: Coleoptera
- Suborder: Polyphaga
- Infraorder: Cucujiformia
- Family: Cerambycidae
- Subfamily: Cerambycinae
- Tribe: Cerambycini
- Genus: Coleoxestia
- Species: C. ebenina

Binomial name
- Coleoxestia ebenina Melzer, 1935

Species of beetle

Coleoxestia ebenina is a species in the longhorn beetle family Cerambycidae. It is found in Argentina, Bolivia, and Brazil.
