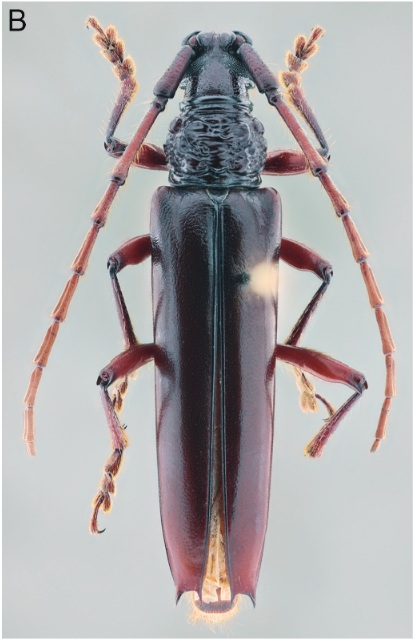

Scientific classification
- Kingdom: Animalia
- Phylum: Arthropoda
- Clade: Pancrustacea
- Class: Insecta
- Order: Coleoptera
- Suborder: Polyphaga
- Infraorder: Cucujiformia
- Family: Cerambycidae
- Subfamily: Cerambycinae
- Tribe: Cerambycini
- Genus: Coleoxestia
- Species: C. waterhousei

Binomial name
- Coleoxestia waterhousei (Gounelle, 1909)

Synonyms
- Coleoxestia denticollis Fragoso, 1982; Xestia waterhousei Gounelle, 1909

= Coleoxestia waterhousei =

Species of beetle

Coleoxestia waterhousei is a species in the longhorn beetle family Cerambycidae. It is found in Argentina, Bolivia, Brazil, Paraguay, and Uruguay.
