= Ochrodion gahani =

Scientific classification
- Kingdom: Animalia
- Phylum: Arthropoda
- Class: Insecta
- Order: Coleoptera
- Suborder: Polyphaga
- Infraorder: Cucujiformia
- Family: Cerambycidae
- Subfamily: Cerambycinae
- Tribe: Cerambycini
- Subtribe: Sphallotrichina
- Genus: Ochrodion
- Species: O. gahani

Binomial name
- Ochrodion gahani (Gounelle, 1909)

Synonyms
- Crioction gahani Gounelle, 1909; Criodion gahani Piza, 1968

Species of beetle

Ochrodion gahani is a species in the longhorn beetle family Cerambycidae. It is found in Brazil.
