= Coleoxestia spinosa =

Scientific classification
- Kingdom: Animalia
- Phylum: Arthropoda
- Class: Insecta
- Order: Coleoptera
- Suborder: Polyphaga
- Infraorder: Cucujiformia
- Family: Cerambycidae
- Subfamily: Cerambycinae
- Tribe: Cerambycini
- Genus: Coleoxestia
- Species: C. spinosa

Binomial name
- Coleoxestia spinosa Galileo & Martins, 2010

Species of beetle

Coleoxestia spinosa is a species in the longhorn beetle family Cerambycidae. It is found in Brazil.
