= Paracriodion romani =

Scientific classification
- Kingdom: Animalia
- Phylum: Arthropoda
- Class: Insecta
- Order: Coleoptera
- Suborder: Polyphaga
- Infraorder: Cucujiformia
- Family: Cerambycidae
- Subfamily: Cerambycinae
- Tribe: Cerambycini
- Subtribe: Sphallotrichina
- Genus: Paracriodion
- Species: P. romani

Binomial name
- Paracriodion romani (Aurivillius, 1926)

Synonyms
- Sphallenum romani Melzer, 1931

Species of beetle

Paracriodion romani is a species in the longhorn beetle family Cerambycidae. It is found in Brazil, Colombia, Ecuador, and French Guiana.
