= Atiaia testaceicornis =

Scientific classification
- Kingdom: Animalia
- Phylum: Arthropoda
- Class: Insecta
- Order: Coleoptera
- Suborder: Polyphaga
- Infraorder: Cucujiformia
- Family: Cerambycidae
- Subfamily: Cerambycinae
- Tribe: Cerambycini
- Genus: Atiaia
- Species: A. testaceicornis

Binomial name
- Atiaia testaceicornis (Melzer, 1923)

Synonyms
- Brasilianus testaceicornis Fragoso, 1982; Brasilianus tstaceicornis Zajciw, 1974; Hamaticherus testaceicornis Melzer, 1927

Species of beetle

Atiaia testaceicornis is a species in the longhorn beetle family Cerambycidae. It is found in Brazil.
