= Coleoxestia denticornis =

Scientific classification
- Kingdom: Animalia
- Phylum: Arthropoda
- Class: Insecta
- Order: Coleoptera
- Suborder: Polyphaga
- Infraorder: Cucujiformia
- Family: Cerambycidae
- Subfamily: Cerambycinae
- Tribe: Cerambycini
- Genus: Coleoxestia
- Species: C. denticornis

Binomial name
- Coleoxestia denticornis (Gahan, 1892)

Synonyms
- Coleoxestia denticulata Zikán & Zikán, 1944; Xestia denticornis Gahan, 1892

Species of beetle

Coleoxestia denticornis is a species in the longhorn beetle family Cerambycidae. It is found in Bolivia, Brazil, and Paraguay.
