= Coleoxestia spinipennis =

Scientific classification
- Kingdom: Animalia
- Phylum: Arthropoda
- Class: Insecta
- Order: Coleoptera
- Suborder: Polyphaga
- Infraorder: Cucujiformia
- Family: Cerambycidae
- Subfamily: Cerambycinae
- Tribe: Cerambycini
- Genus: Coleoxestia
- Species: C. spinipennis

Binomial name
- Coleoxestia spinipennis (Audinet-Serville, 1834)

Synonyms
- Cerambyx spinipennis Castelnau, 1840; Coleoxestia spinipennis spinipennis Monné & Hovore, 2006; Xestia spinipennis Gounelle, 1909

Species of beetle

Coleoxestia spinipennis is a species in the longhorn beetle family Cerambycidae. It is found in Uruguay, Paraguay, Argentina, and Brazil.

== Subspecies ==
These two subspecies belong to the species Coleoxestia spinipennis:

- Coleoxestia spinipennis interiorana Fragoso, 1993 (Brazil)
- Coleoxestia spinipennis spinipennis Monné & Hovore, 2006
