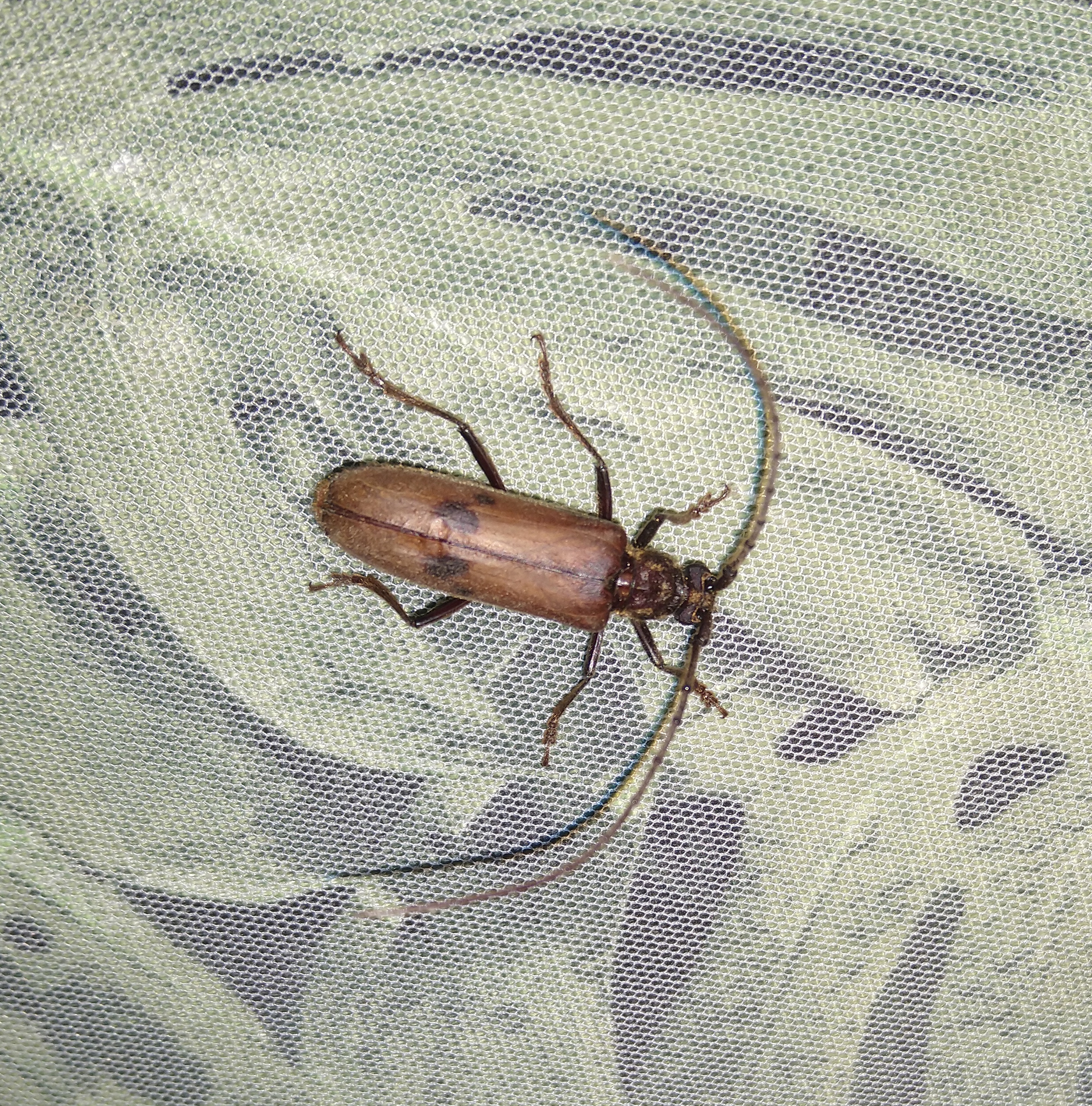
- Ochrodion sexmaculatum, Brasil

Scientific classification
- Kingdom: Animalia
- Phylum: Arthropoda
- Class: Insecta
- Order: Coleoptera
- Suborder: Polyphaga
- Infraorder: Cucujiformia
- Family: Cerambycidae
- Subfamily: Cerambycinae
- Tribe: Cerambycini
- Subtribe: Sphallotrichina
- Genus: Ochrodion
- Species: O. sexmaculatum

Binomial name
- Ochrodion sexmaculatum (Buquet, 1844)

Synonyms
- Criodion 6-maculatum Thomson, 1878; Criodion sexmaculatum White, 1853; Criodion sommeri Aurivillius, 1912; Ochrodion sommeri Monné & Giesbert, 1994

= Ochrodion sexmaculatum =

Species of beetle

Ochrodion sexmaculatum is a species in the longhorn beetle family Cerambycidae. It is found in Brazil.
