= Coleoxestia globulicollis =

Scientific classification
- Kingdom: Animalia
- Phylum: Arthropoda
- Class: Insecta
- Order: Coleoptera
- Suborder: Polyphaga
- Infraorder: Cucujiformia
- Family: Cerambycidae
- Subfamily: Cerambycinae
- Tribe: Cerambycini
- Genus: Coleoxestia
- Species: C. globulicollis

Binomial name
- Coleoxestia globulicollis (Gahan, 1892)

Synonyms
- Coleoxestia globicollis Zajciw, 1972; Xestia globulicollis Gahan, 1892

Species of beetle

Coleoxestia globulicollis is a species in the longhorn beetle family Cerambycidae. It is found in Brazil.
