= Ochrodion tavakiliani =

Scientific classification
- Kingdom: Animalia
- Phylum: Arthropoda
- Class: Insecta
- Order: Coleoptera
- Suborder: Polyphaga
- Infraorder: Cucujiformia
- Family: Cerambycidae
- Subfamily: Cerambycinae
- Tribe: Cerambycini
- Subtribe: Sphallotrichina
- Genus: Ochrodion
- Species: O. tavakiliani

Binomial name
- Ochrodion tavakiliani Martins & Monné, 2005

Species of beetle

Ochrodion tavakiliani is a species in the longhorn beetle family Cerambycidae. It is found in French Guiana.
