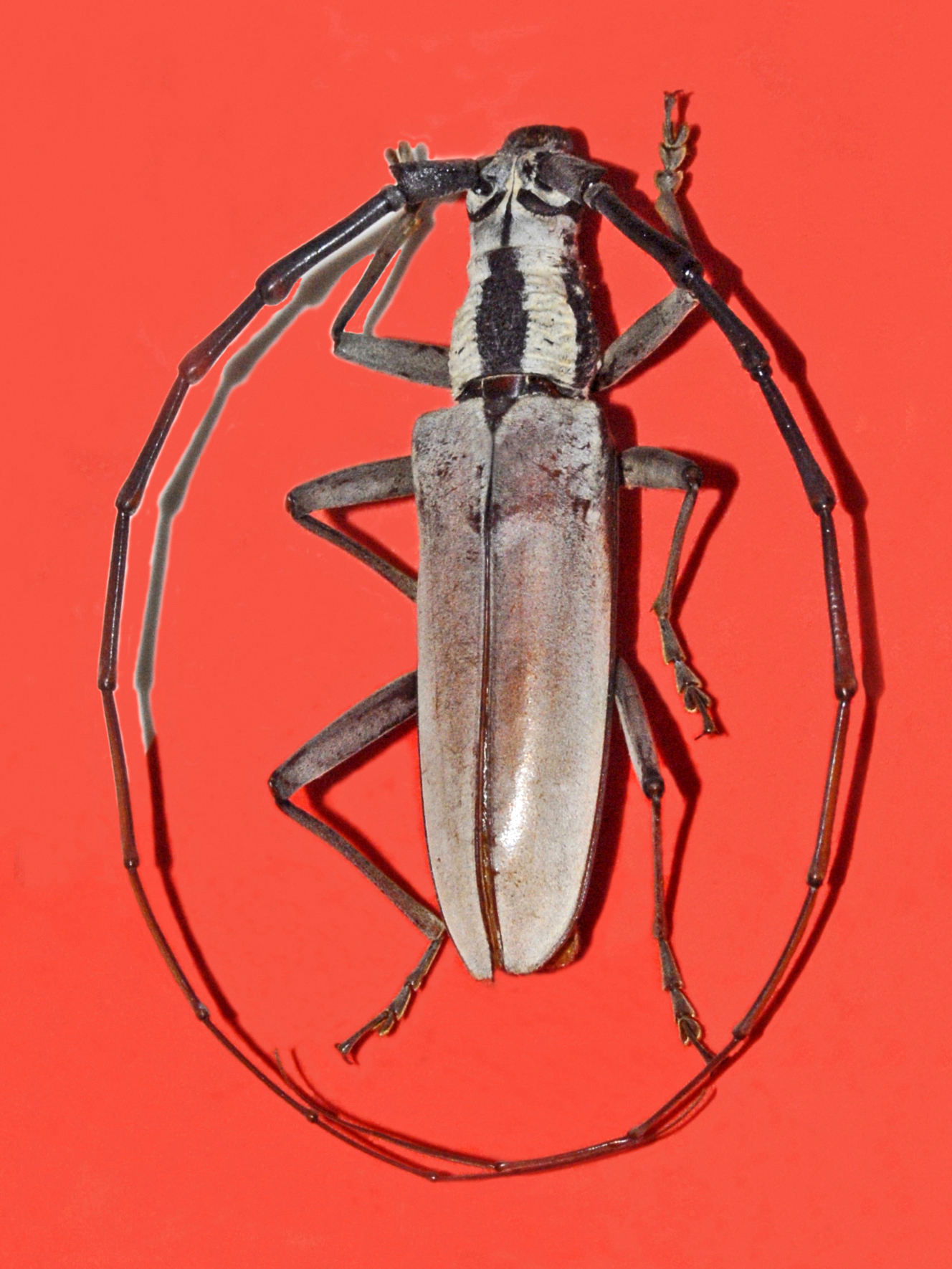
- Museum specimen of Massicus pascoei

Scientific classification
- Kingdom: Animalia
- Phylum: Arthropoda
- Clade: Pancrustacea
- Class: Insecta
- Order: Coleoptera
- Suborder: Polyphaga
- Infraorder: Cucujiformia
- Family: Cerambycidae
- Tribe: Cerambycini
- Subtribe: Cerambycina
- Genus: Massicus
- Species: M. pascoei

Binomial name
- Massicus pascoei (Thomson, 1857)

Synonyms
- Conothorax pascoei (Thomson) Thomson, 1865; Cerambyx pascoei Thomson, 1857

= Massicus pascoei =

Species of beetle

Massicus pascoei is a species of round-necked longhorn beetles of the subfamily Cerambycinae.

== Description ==
Massicus pascoei can reach a body length of about 55–67 millimetres (2.2–2.6 in) and a body width of about 17–18 millimetres (0.67–0.71 in). The basic color of the body is pale brown or greyish, with dense luteous pubescence. Prothorax is narrow and rugose and shows broad longitudinal hairy stripes. Elytra are elongated and gradually narrow posteriorly. Antennae are black, longer than the body.

== Distribution and habitat ==
This species can be found in eastern India, Peninsular Malaysia, Myanmar and Sumatra. It lives in primary mixed dipterocarp forests.
