= Coleoxestia corvina =

Scientific classification
- Kingdom: Animalia
- Phylum: Arthropoda
- Class: Insecta
- Order: Coleoptera
- Suborder: Polyphaga
- Infraorder: Cucujiformia
- Family: Cerambycidae
- Subfamily: Cerambycinae
- Tribe: Cerambycini
- Genus: Coleoxestia
- Species: C. corvina

Binomial name
- Coleoxestia corvina (Germar, 1824)

Synonyms
- Butherion scabricolle Martins & Monné, 2005; Butherium corvinum Gahan, 1904; Butherium scabricolle Blackwelder, 1946; Cerambyx corvinus Germar, 1824; Coleoxestia corvinus Viana, 1972; Criodion corvinum White, 1853; Criodion corvinus Germar, 1839; Xestia corvina Gahan, 1892

Species of beetle

Coleoxestia corvina is a species in the longhorn beetle family Cerambycidae. It is found in Uruguay, Paraguay, Brazil, Argentina, and Bolivia.
