= Coleoxestia glabripennis =

Scientific classification
- Kingdom: Animalia
- Phylum: Arthropoda
- Class: Insecta
- Order: Coleoptera
- Suborder: Polyphaga
- Infraorder: Cucujiformia
- Family: Cerambycidae
- Subfamily: Cerambycinae
- Tribe: Cerambycini
- Genus: Coleoxestia
- Species: C. glabripennis

Binomial name
- Coleoxestia glabripennis (Bates, 1870)

Synonyms
- Xestia glabripennis Bates, 1870

Species of beetle

Coleoxestia glabripennis is a species in the longhorn beetle family Cerambycidae. It is found in Bolivia and Brazil.
