= Paracriodion modestum =

Scientific classification
- Kingdom: Animalia
- Phylum: Arthropoda
- Class: Insecta
- Order: Coleoptera
- Suborder: Polyphaga
- Infraorder: Cucujiformia
- Family: Cerambycidae
- Subfamily: Cerambycinae
- Tribe: Cerambycini
- Subtribe: Sphallotrichina
- Genus: Paracriodion
- Species: P. modestum

Binomial name
- Paracriodion modestum (Buquet, 1852)

Synonyms
- Criodion modestum Buquet, 1852; Sphallenum pubicolle Zajciw, 1958; Sphallenum pubicollis Zikán & Wygodzinsky, 1948

Species of beetle

Paracriodion modestum is a species in the longhorn beetle family Cerambycidae. It is found in Brazil.
