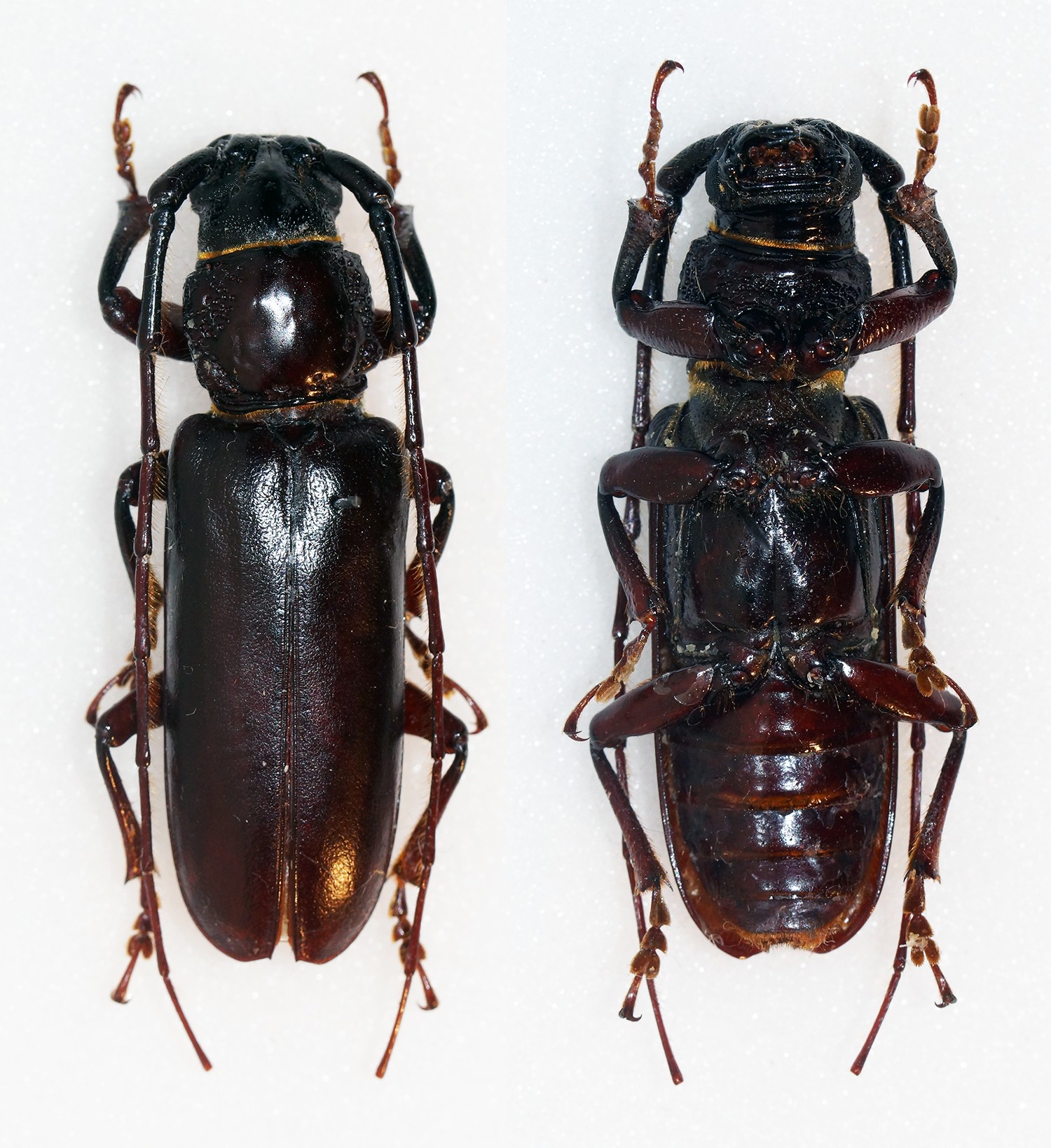
- Butherium erythropus

Scientific classification
- Domain: Eukaryota
- Kingdom: Animalia
- Phylum: Arthropoda
- Class: Insecta
- Order: Coleoptera
- Suborder: Polyphaga
- Infraorder: Cucujiformia
- Family: Cerambycidae
- Subfamily: Cerambycinae
- Tribe: Cerambycini
- Genus: Butherium; Bates, 1870
- Species: B. erythropus

Binomial name
- Butherium erythropus (Lucas, 1859)

= Butherium =

Genus of beetles

Butherium is a genus of Long-Horned Beetles in the beetle family Cerambycidae. This genus has a single species, Butherium erythropus. It is found in Brazil, Ecuador, Argentina, Paraguay, and Bolivia.

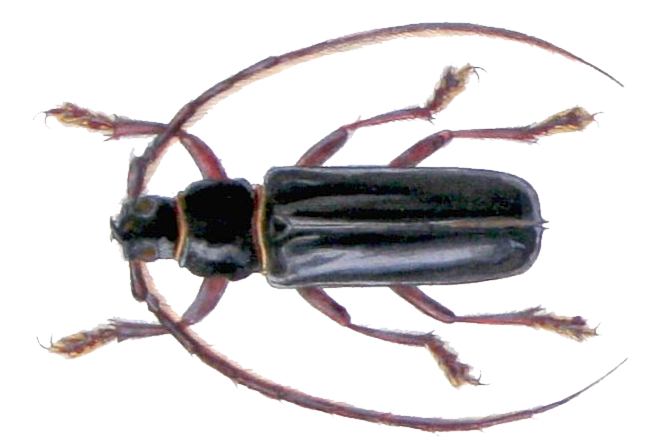
Butherium erythropus
