= Paracriodion =

Scientific classification
- Kingdom: Animalia
- Phylum: Arthropoda
- Class: Insecta
- Order: Coleoptera
- Suborder: Polyphaga
- Infraorder: Cucujiformia
- Family: Cerambycidae
- Subfamily: Cerambycinae
- Tribe: Cerambycini
- Subtribe: Sphallotrichina
- Genus: Paracriodion; Fragoso, 1982

Genus of beetles

Paracriodion is a genus of longhorn beetles in the family Cerambycidae. There are at least three described species in Paracriodion.

== Species ==
These three species belong to the genus Paracriodion:

- Paracriodion modestum (Buquet, 1852) (Brazil)
- Paracriodion morrisi Monné, 2014 (Bolivia)
- Paracriodion romani (Aurivillius, 1926) (Brazil, Colombia, Ecuador, and French Guiana)
