= Sphallenum =

Scientific classification
- Domain: Eukaryota
- Kingdom: Animalia
- Phylum: Arthropoda
- Class: Insecta
- Order: Coleoptera
- Suborder: Polyphaga
- Infraorder: Cucujiformia
- Family: Cerambycidae
- Subfamily: Cerambycinae
- Tribe: Cerambycini
- Genus: Sphallenum; Bates, 1870
- Species: S. tuberosum

Binomial name
- Sphallenum tuberosum Bates, 1870

Genus of beetles

Sphallenum is a genus of longhorn beetles in the family Cerambycidae. This genus has a single species, Sphallenum tuberosum. It is found in Brazil, Ecuador, and French Guiana.
