= Sphallambyx =

Scientific classification
- Domain: Eukaryota
- Kingdom: Animalia
- Phylum: Arthropoda
- Class: Insecta
- Order: Coleoptera
- Suborder: Polyphaga
- Infraorder: Cucujiformia
- Family: Cerambycidae
- Tribe: Cerambycini
- Genus: Sphallambyx

Genus of beetles

Sphallambyx is a genus of beetles in the family Cerambycidae, containing the following species:

- Sphallambyx chabrillacii (Thomson, 1857) (Costa Rica and Brazil)
- Sphallambyx mexicanum Galileo & Martins, 2007 (Mexico)
- Sphallambyx superbum (Aurivillius, 1910) (Peru, Ecuador, Bolivia, Brazil, and Colombia)
