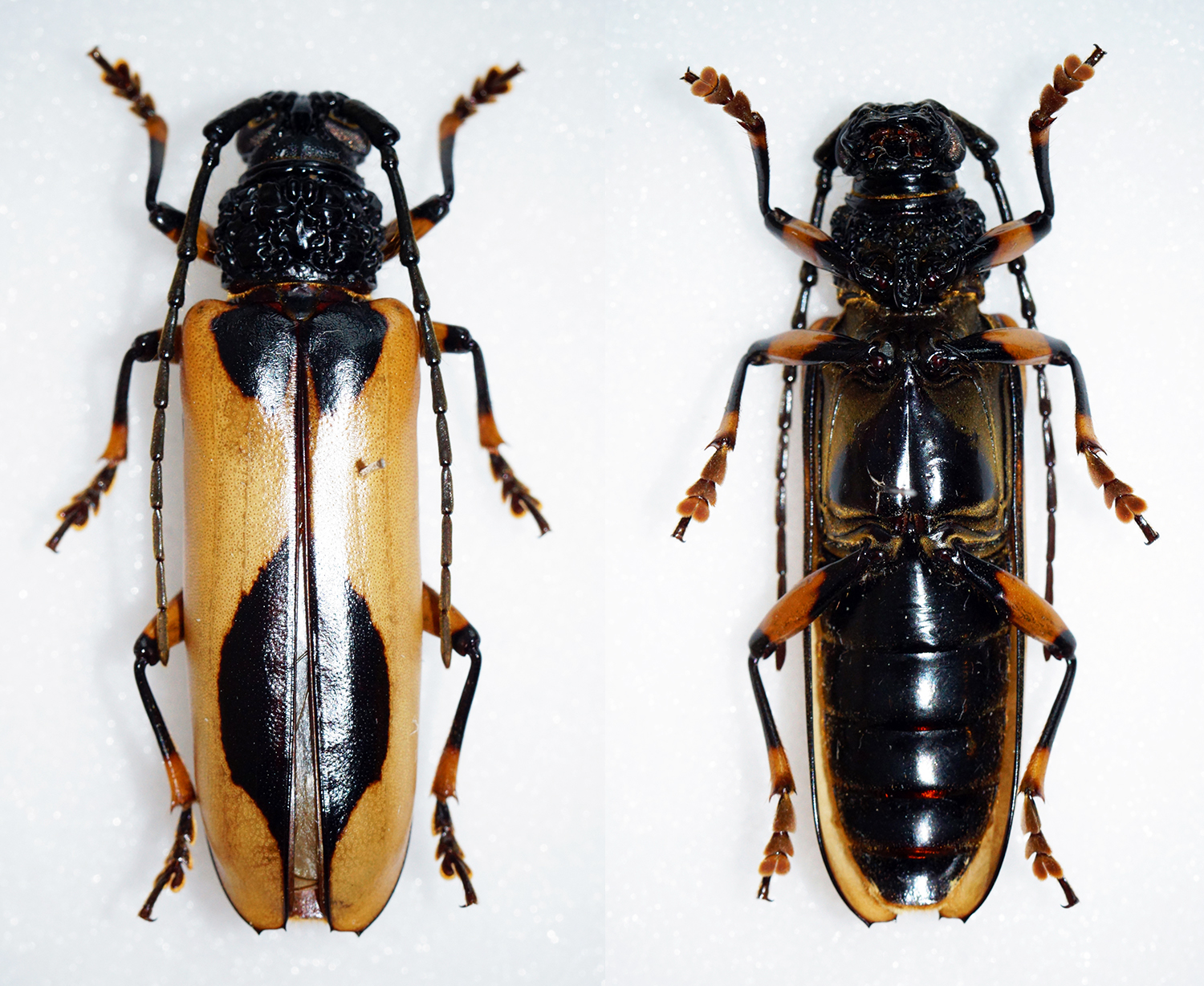
- Metacriodion pictum

Scientific classification
- Domain: Eukaryota
- Kingdom: Animalia
- Phylum: Arthropoda
- Class: Insecta
- Order: Coleoptera
- Suborder: Polyphaga
- Infraorder: Cucujiformia
- Family: Cerambycidae
- Subfamily: Cerambycinae
- Tribe: Cerambycini
- Subtribe: Sphallotrichina
- Genus: Metacriodion; Fragoso, 1970

= Metacriodion =

Genus of beetles

Metacriodion is a genus of longhorn beetles in the family Cerambycidae. There are at least two described species in Metacriodion.

== Species ==
These two species belong to the genus Metacriodion:

- Metacriodion capixaba Fragoso, 1970 (Brazil)
- Metacriodion pictum (Waterhouse, 1880) (Ecuador, French Guiana, Bolivia, and Peru)
