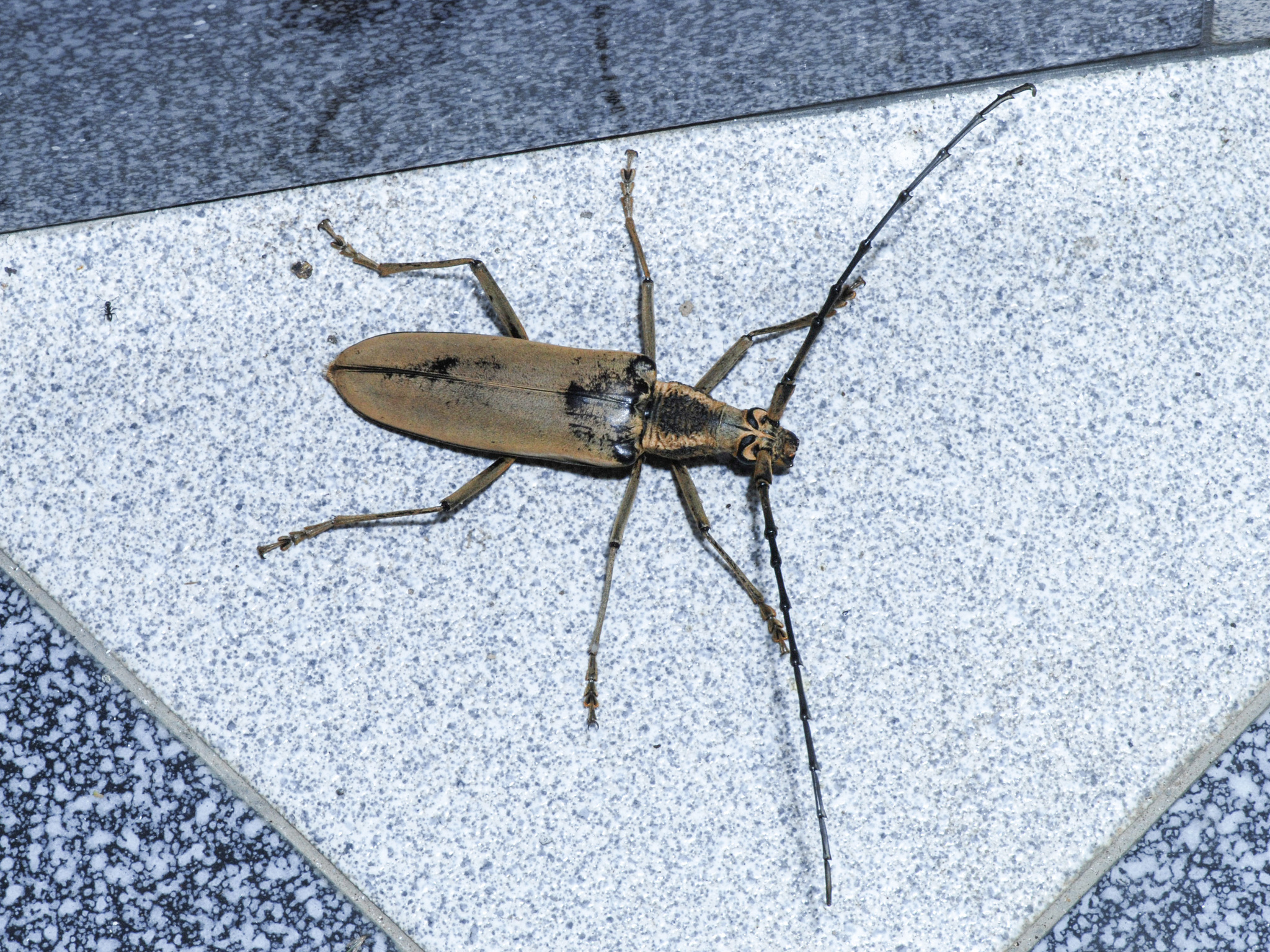
- Massicus, Malaysia

Scientific classification
- Kingdom: Animalia
- Phylum: Arthropoda
- Class: Insecta
- Order: Coleoptera
- Suborder: Polyphaga
- Infraorder: Cucujiformia
- Family: Cerambycidae
- Subfamily: Cerambycinae
- Tribe: Cerambycini
- Subtribe: Cerambycina
- Genus: Massicus; Pascoe, 1867

Synonyms
- Conothorax Thomson, 1865 nec Jekel, 1854; Falsomassicus Picard, 1946

= Massicus (beetle) =

Genus of beetles

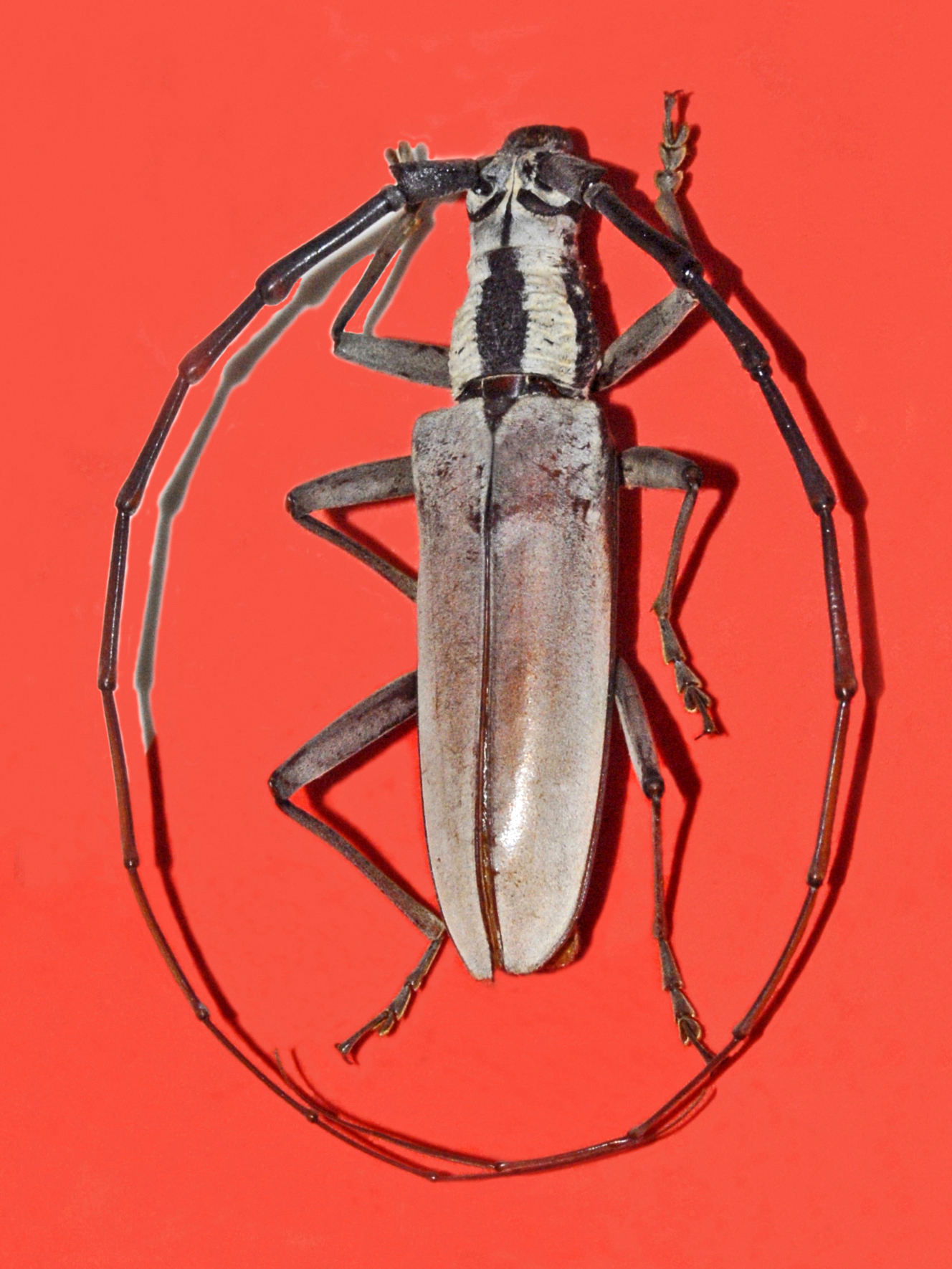
Museum specimen of Massicus pascoei

Massicus is a genus of Long-Horned Beetles in the beetle subfamily Cerambycinae. There are at least 15 described species in Massicus, found in South, Southeast, and East Asia.

== Species ==
These 15 species belong to the genus Massicus:

- Massicus fryi Gahan, 1890 (Borneo)
- Massicus intricatus (Pascoe, 1866) (Malaysia)
- Massicus ivani Miroshnikov, 2017
- Massicus pascoei (Thomson, 1857) (Borneo, India, and Malaysia)
- Massicus philippensis Hüdepohl, 1990 (Philippines)
- Massicus punctulipennis Holzschuh, 2018
- Massicus regius Miroshnikov, 2019
- Massicus scapulatus Hüdepohl, 1994 (Thailand, Borneo, and Myanmar)
- Massicus sufficiens Holzschuh, 2018
- Massicus suffusus Gressitt & Rondon, 1970 (Laos)
- Massicus taiwanus Makihara & Niisato, 2014 (temperate Asia)
- Massicus theresae (Pic, 1946) (China)
- Massicus trilineatus (Pic, 1933) (Southeast Asia and temperate Asia)
- Massicus valentinae Miroshnikov, 2017
- Massicus venustus (Pascoe, 1859) (China, India, and Sri Lanka)
