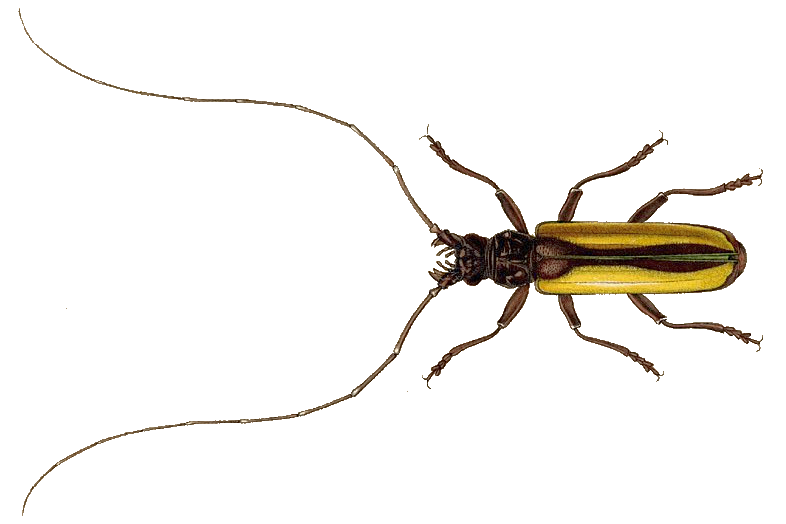
- Macrambyx suturalis

Scientific classification
- Kingdom: Animalia
- Phylum: Arthropoda
- Class: Insecta
- Order: Coleoptera
- Suborder: Polyphaga
- Infraorder: Cucujiformia
- Family: Cerambycidae
- Subfamily: Cerambycinae
- Tribe: Cerambycini
- Genus: Macrambyx; Fragoso, 1982
- Species: M. suturalis

Binomial name
- Macrambyx suturalis (Gory, 1832)

= Macrambyx =

Genus of beetles

Macrambyx is a genus in the longhorn beetle family Cerambycidae. This genus has a single species, Macrambyx suturalis. It is found in Peru, Brazil, Ecuador, and French Guiana.
