= Iuati =

Scientific classification
- Domain: Eukaryota
- Kingdom: Animalia
- Phylum: Arthropoda
- Class: Insecta
- Order: Coleoptera
- Suborder: Polyphaga
- Infraorder: Cucujiformia
- Family: Cerambycidae
- Tribe: Cerambycini
- Subtribe: Sphallotrichina
- Genus: Iuati; Martins & Galileo, 2010
- Species: I. spinithorax

Binomial name
- Iuati spinithorax Martins & Galileo, 2010

Genus of beetles

Iuati is a genus of longhorn beetles in the family Cerambycidae. This genus has a single species, Iuati spinithorax, found in Brazil.
