= Carinolesthes =

Scientific classification
- Domain: Eukaryota
- Kingdom: Animalia
- Phylum: Arthropoda
- Class: Insecta
- Order: Coleoptera
- Suborder: Polyphaga
- Infraorder: Cucujiformia
- Family: Cerambycidae
- Subfamily: Cerambycinae
- Tribe: Cerambycini
- Genus: Carinolesthes; Vitali, Gouverneur & Chemin, 2017

Genus of beetles

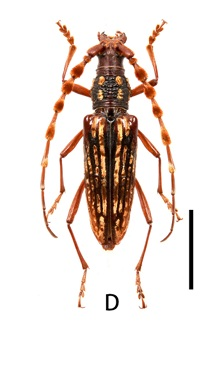
Carinolesthes pericalles

Carinolesthes is a genus of longhorn beetles in the family Cerambycidae.

== Species ==
- Carinolesthes aurosignata (Pic, 1915)
- Carinolesthes dembickyi Miroshnikov, 18538
- Carinolesthes ningshanensis (Chiang, 1981)
- Carinolesthes pericalles (Gressitt & Rondon, 1970)
