= Sphallopterus =

Scientific classification
- Domain: Eukaryota
- Kingdom: Animalia
- Phylum: Arthropoda
- Class: Insecta
- Order: Coleoptera
- Suborder: Polyphaga
- Infraorder: Cucujiformia
- Family: Cerambycidae
- Subfamily: Cerambycinae
- Tribe: Cerambycini
- Genus: Sphallopterus; Fragoso, 1982
- Species: S. batesi

Binomial name
- Sphallopterus batesi Fragoso, 1982

Genus of beetles

Sphallopterus is a genus of longhorn beetles in the family Cerambycidae. This genus has a single species, Sphallopterus batesi, found in Brazil.
