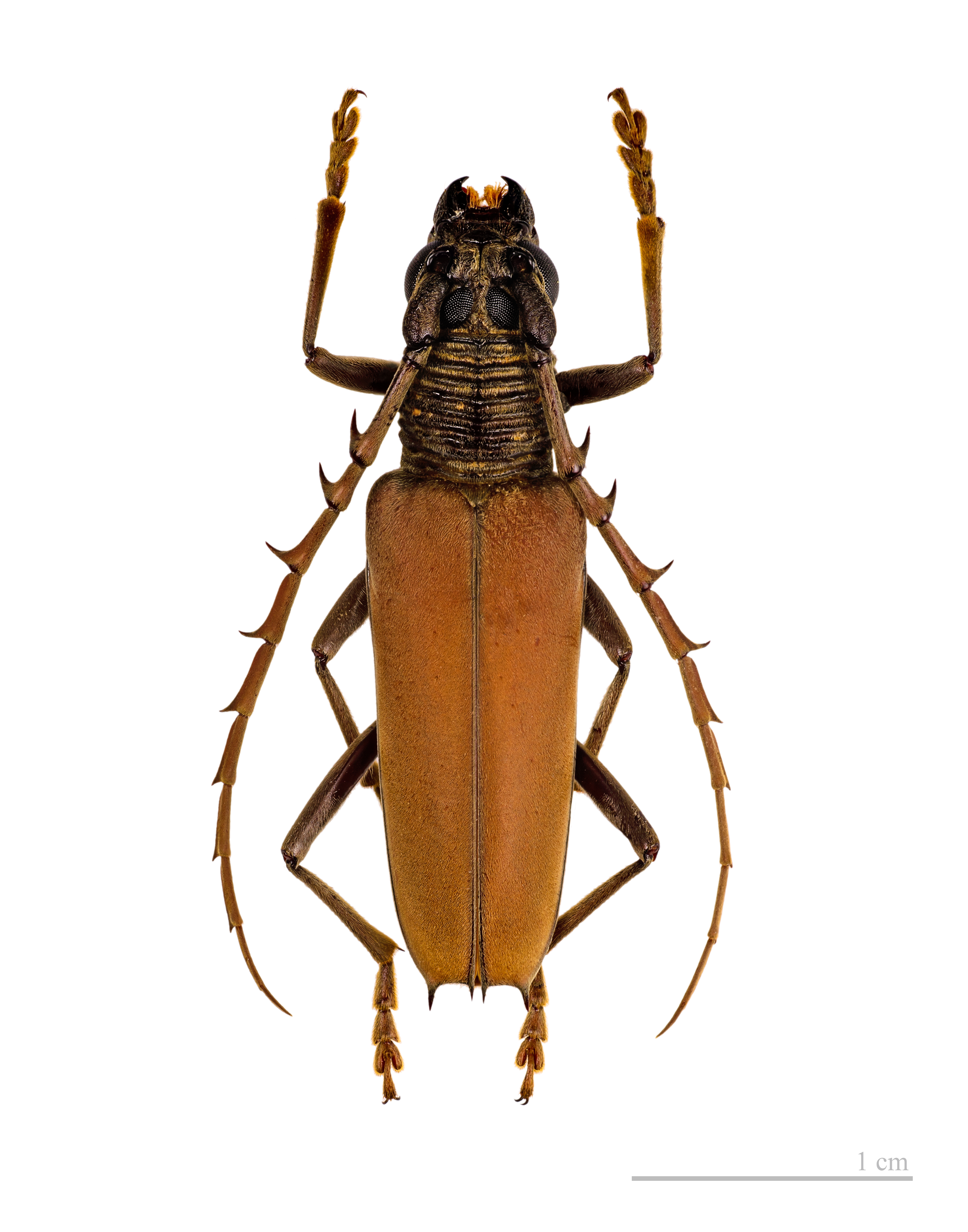
- Atiaia consobrina

Scientific classification
- Domain: Eukaryota
- Kingdom: Animalia
- Phylum: Arthropoda
- Class: Insecta
- Order: Coleoptera
- Suborder: Polyphaga
- Infraorder: Cucujiformia
- Family: Cerambycidae
- Subfamily: Cerambycinae
- Tribe: Cerambycini
- Genus: Atiaia

= Atiaia =

Genus of beetles

Atiaia is a genus of Long-Horned Beetles in the beetle family Cerambycidae. There are at least two described species in Atiaia.

== Species ==
These two species belong to the genus Atiaia:

- Atiaia consobrina (Gahan, 1892) (Venezuela, Brazil, French Guiana, and Suriname)
- Atiaia testaceicornis (Melzer, 1923) (Brazil)
