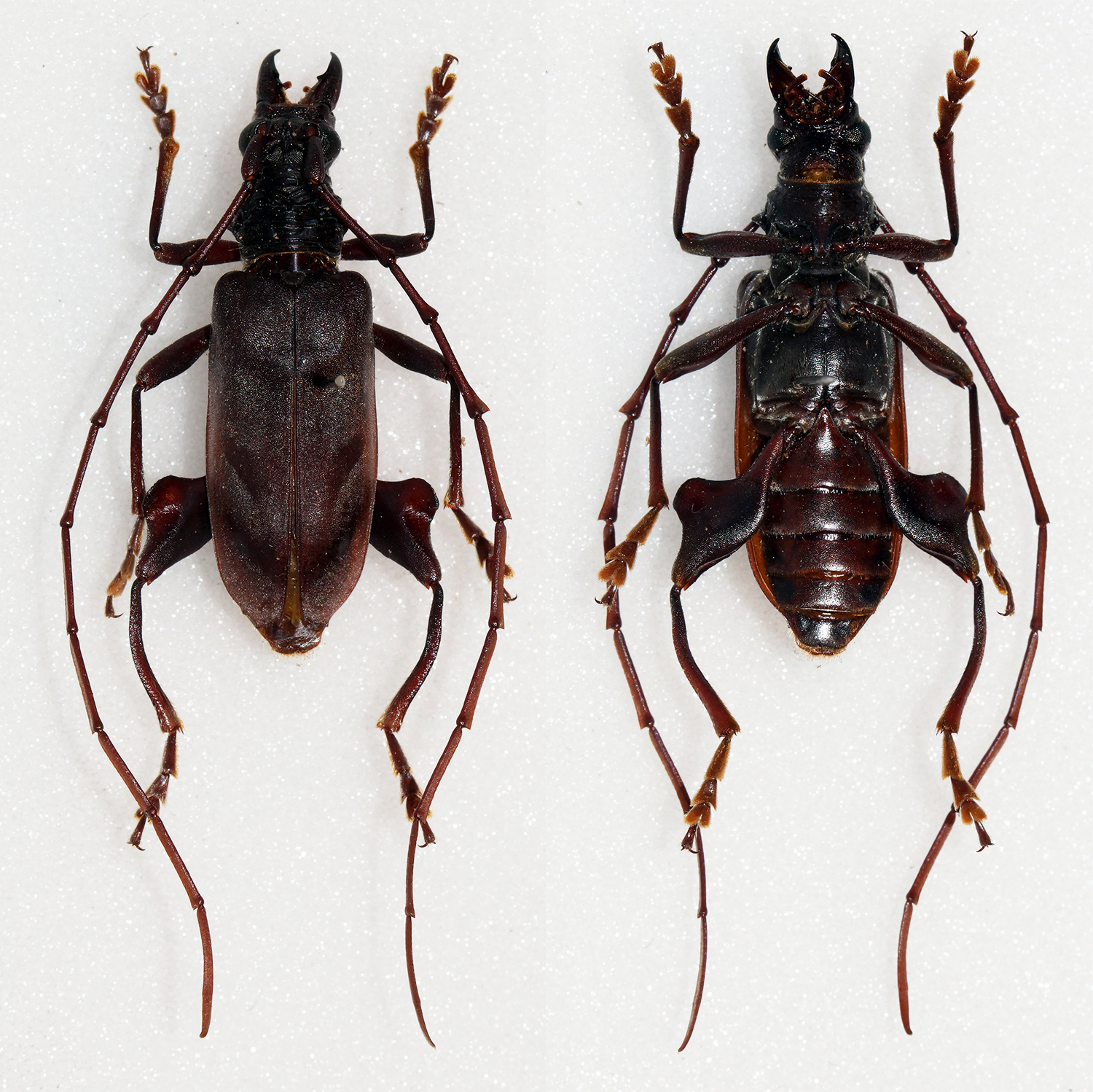
- Male

Scientific classification
- Kingdom: Animalia
- Phylum: Arthropoda
- Clade: Pancrustacea
- Class: Insecta
- Order: Coleoptera
- Suborder: Polyphaga
- Infraorder: Cucujiformia
- Family: Cerambycidae
- Subfamily: Cerambycinae
- Tribe: Cerambycini
- Genus: Utopia; Thomson, 1864
- Species: U. castelnaudi

Binomial name
- Utopia castelnaudi Thomson, 1864

Synonyms
- Utopia Castelnaudii Thomson, 1864 (Orig, Missp.)

= Utopia castelnaudi =

Species of beetle

Utopia is a monotypic genus of longhorn beetles in the tribe Cerambycini, containing only the species Utopia castelnaudi, which occurs in Borneo and Sumatra.
