= Ischionorox =

Scientific classification
- Domain: Eukaryota
- Kingdom: Animalia
- Phylum: Arthropoda
- Class: Insecta
- Order: Coleoptera
- Suborder: Polyphaga
- Infraorder: Cucujiformia
- Family: Cerambycidae
- Tribe: Cerambycini
- Subtribe: Sphallotrichina
- Genus: Ischionorox; Aurivillius, 1922
- Species: I. antiqua

Binomial name
- Ischionorox antiqua Aurivillius, 1922

Genus of beetles

Ischionorox is a genus of longhorn beetles in the family Cerambycidae. This genus has a single species, Ischionorox antiqua, found in Argentina.
