= Parasphallenum =

Scientific classification
- Kingdom: Animalia
- Phylum: Arthropoda
- Class: Insecta
- Order: Coleoptera
- Suborder: Polyphaga
- Infraorder: Cucujiformia
- Family: Cerambycidae
- Tribe: Cerambycini
- Subtribe: Sphallotrichina
- Genus: Parasphallenum; Fragoso, 1982
- Species: P. fulguratum

Binomial name
- Parasphallenum fulguratum (Chabrillac, 1857)

Genus of beetles

Parasphallenum is a genus of longhorn beetles in the family Cerambycidae. This genus has a single species, Parasphallenum fulguratum, found in Brazil.
