= Paratiaia =

Scientific classification
- Kingdom: Animalia
- Phylum: Arthropoda
- Class: Insecta
- Order: Coleoptera
- Suborder: Polyphaga
- Infraorder: Cucujiformia
- Family: Cerambycidae
- Tribe: Cerambycini
- Subtribe: Cerambycina
- Genus: Paratiaia; Dalens & Giuglaris, 2012
- Species: P. hulini

Binomial name
- Paratiaia hulini Dalens & Giuglaris, 2012

Genus of beetles

Paratiaia is a genus of longhorn beetles in the family Cerambycidae. This genus has a single species, Paratiaia hulini, found in French Guiana.
