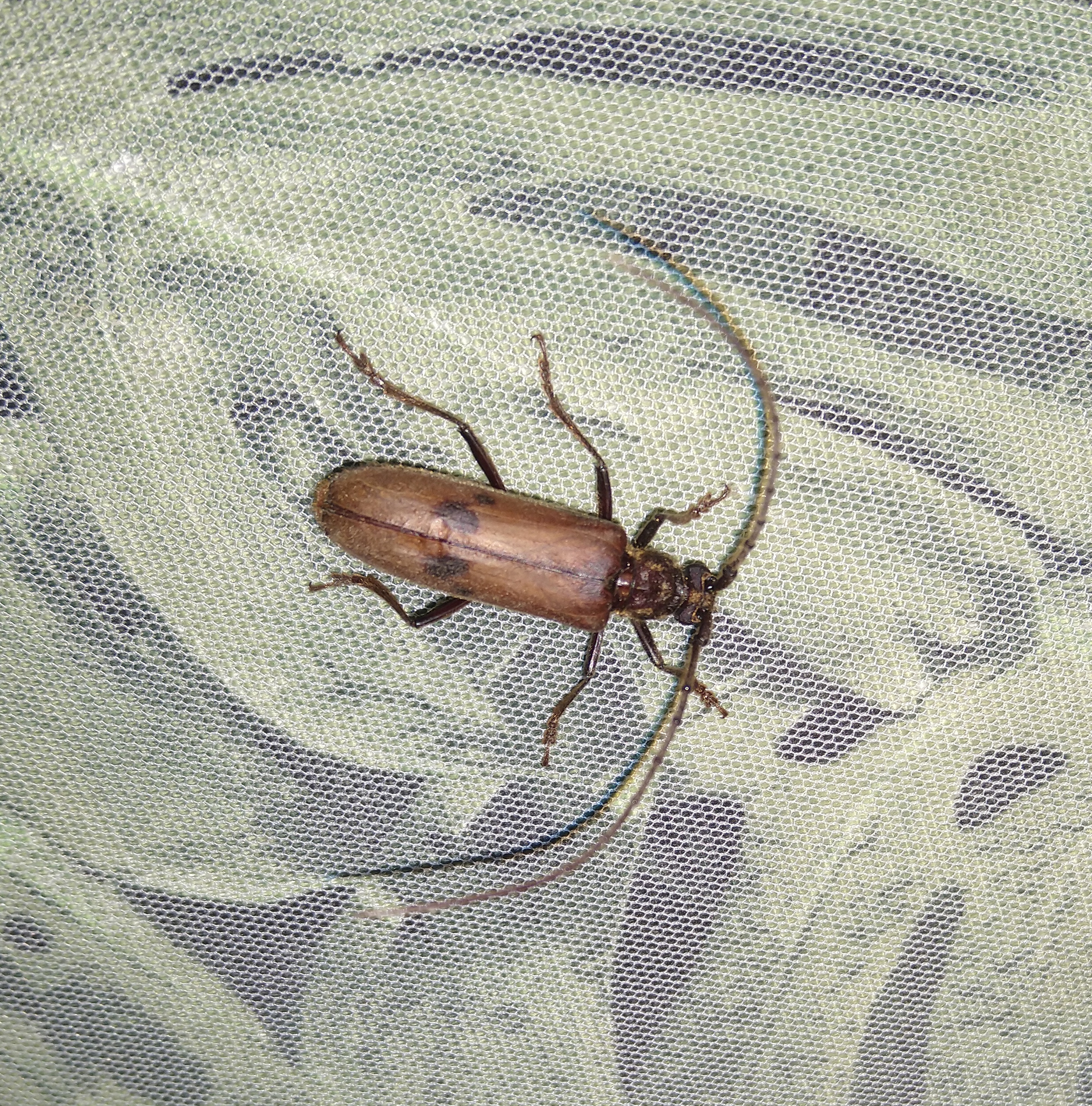
- Ochrodion sexmaculatum, Brazil

Scientific classification
- Kingdom: Animalia
- Phylum: Arthropoda
- Class: Insecta
- Order: Coleoptera
- Suborder: Polyphaga
- Infraorder: Cucujiformia
- Family: Cerambycidae
- Subfamily: Cerambycinae
- Tribe: Cerambycini
- Subtribe: Sphallotrichina
- Genus: Ochrodion; Fragoso, 1982

= Ochrodion =

Genus of beetles

Ochrodion is a genus of longhorn beetles in the family Cerambycidae. There are about five described species in Ochrodion, found in Brazil and French Guiana.

== Species ==
These five species belong to the genus Ochrodion:

- Ochrodion gahani (Gounelle, 1909) (Brazil)
- Ochrodion quadrimaculatum (Gahan, 1892) (Brazil)
- Ochrodion sexmaculatum (Buquet, 1844) (Brazil)
- Ochrodion tavakiliani Martins & Monné, 2005 (French Guiana)
- Ochrodion testaceum (Gahan, 1892) (Brazil)
