= Cevaeria =

Scientific classification
- Domain: Eukaryota
- Kingdom: Animalia
- Phylum: Arthropoda
- Class: Insecta
- Order: Coleoptera
- Suborder: Polyphaga
- Infraorder: Cucujiformia
- Family: Cerambycidae
- Subfamily: Cerambycinae
- Tribe: Cerambycini
- Genus: Cevaeria; Tavakilian, 2004
- Species: C. estebani

Binomial name
- Cevaeria estebani Tavakilian, 2004

Genus of beetles

Cevaeria is a genus of Long-Horned Beetles in the beetle family Cerambycidae. This genus has a single species, Cevaeria estebani. It is found in Bolivia and French Guiana.
