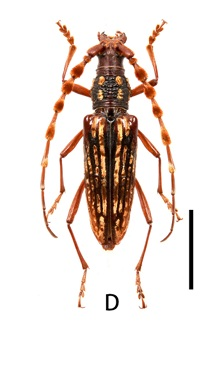

Scientific classification
- Domain: Eukaryota
- Kingdom: Animalia
- Phylum: Arthropoda
- Class: Insecta
- Order: Coleoptera
- Suborder: Polyphaga
- Infraorder: Cucujiformia
- Family: Cerambycidae
- Genus: Carinolesthes
- Species: C. pericalles

Binomial name
- Carinolesthes pericalles (Gressitt & Rondon, 1970)

Synonyms
- Aeolesthes (Pseudaeolesthes) pericalles Gressitt & Rondon, 1970

= Carinolesthes pericalles =

Species of beetle

Carinolesthes pericalles is a species of beetle of the family Cerambycidae. This species is found in China (Yunnan), Laos and Vietnam.
