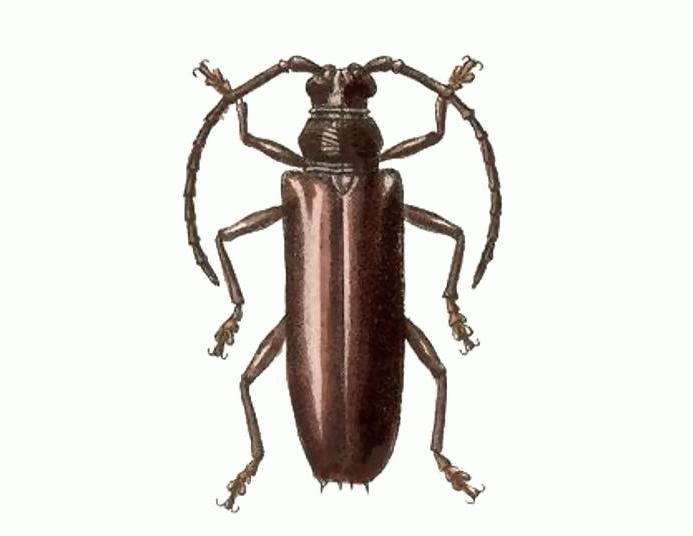
- Coleoxestia nitida

Scientific classification
- Domain: Eukaryota
- Kingdom: Animalia
- Phylum: Arthropoda
- Class: Insecta
- Order: Coleoptera
- Suborder: Polyphaga
- Infraorder: Cucujiformia
- Family: Cerambycidae
- Subfamily: Cerambycinae
- Tribe: Cerambycini
- Genus: Coleoxestia; Aurivillius, 1912

Synonyms
- Xestia Audinet-Serville, 1834

= Coleoxestia =

Genus of beetles

Coleoxestia is a genus of Long-Horned Beetles in the beetle family Cerambycidae. There are more than 50 described species in Coleoxestia, found mainly in Central and South America.

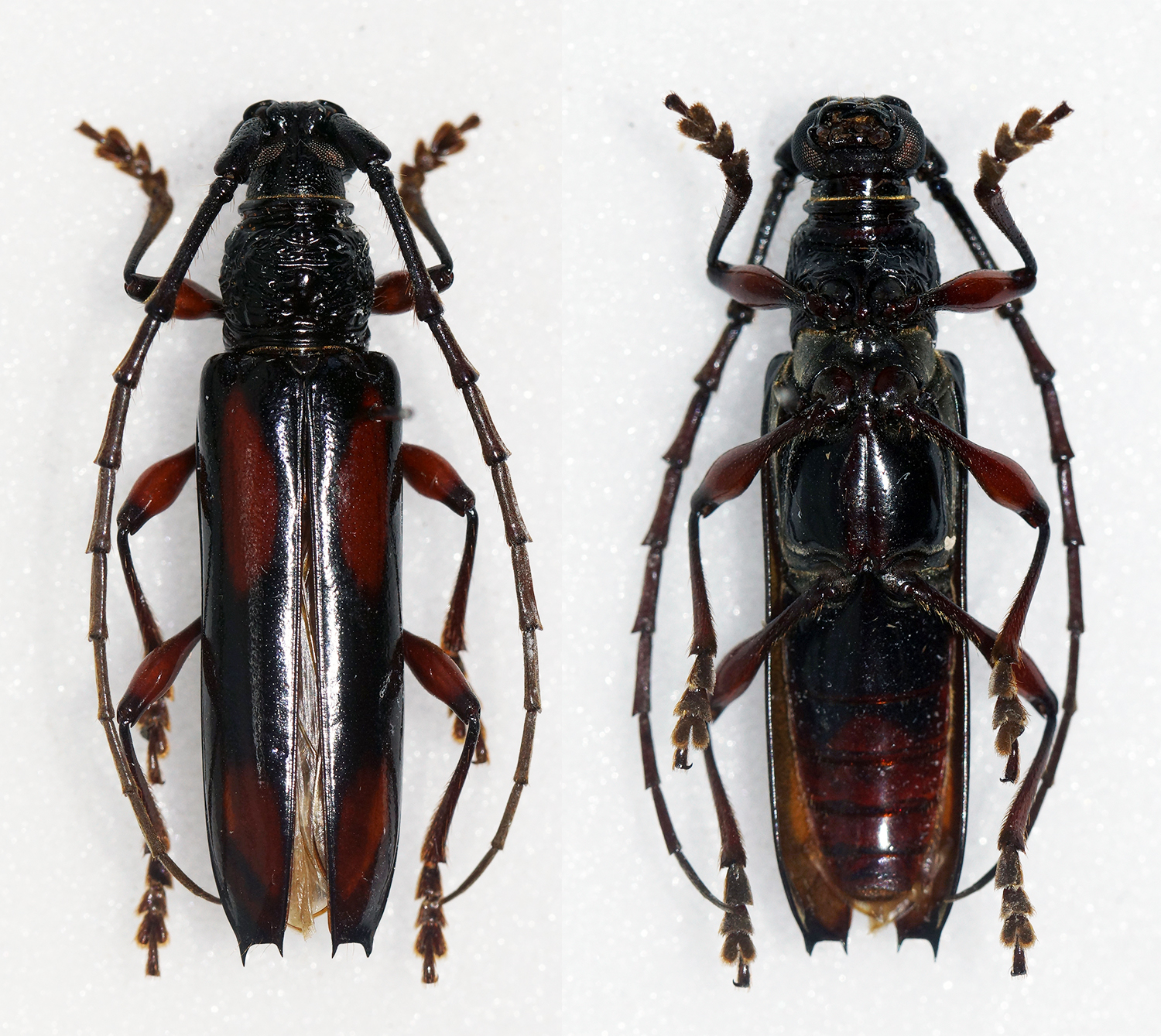
Coleoxestia rubromaculata

== Species ==
These 56 species belong to the genus Coleoxestia:

- Coleoxestia anthracina Martins & Monné, 2005 (Brazil)
- Coleoxestia apeara Galileo & Santos-Silva, 2016
- Coleoxestia armata (Gounelle, 1909) (Brazil)
- Coleoxestia atrata (Gounelle, 1909) (South America)
- Coleoxestia aurigena Martins & Monné, 2005 (Ecuador)
- Coleoxestia beckeri Galileo, Martins & Santos-Silva, 2015
- Coleoxestia bettellaorum Galileo & Santos-Silva, 2016
- Coleoxestia brevipennis (Bates, 1870) (Brazil)
- Coleoxestia chemsaki Santos-Silva & Wappes, 2017
- Coleoxestia cinnamomea (Gounelle, 1909) (Paraguay, Argentina, and Brazil)
- Coleoxestia clarkei Santos-Silva & Wappes, 2017
- Coleoxestia corvina (Germar, 1823) (South America)
- Coleoxestia curoei Eya & Chemsak, 2005 (Central America)
- Coleoxestia denticornis (Gahan, 1892) (Bolivia, Brazil, and Paraguay)
- Coleoxestia diamantina Nascimento & Santos-Silva, 2018
- Coleoxestia ebenina Melzer, 1935 (Argentina, Bolivia, and Brazil)
- Coleoxestia errata Martins & Monné, 2005 (Bolivia and Brazil)
- Coleoxestia exotica Martins & Monné, 2005 (Brazil and Paraguay)
- Coleoxestia eyai Santos-Silva & Wappes, 2017
- Coleoxestia fasciola Martins & Monné, 2005 (Argentina)
- Coleoxestia femorata (Gounelle, 1909) (Bolivia and Brazil)
- Coleoxestia fragosoi Santos-Silva & Wappes, 2017
- Coleoxestia glabripennis (Bates, 1870) (Bolivia and Brazil)
- Coleoxestia globulicollis (Gahan, 1892) (Brazil)
- Coleoxestia guttula Martins & Monné, 2005 (Brazil)
- Coleoxestia hovorei Santos-Silva & Wappes, 2017
- Coleoxestia illex (Gounelle, 1909) (Brazil)
- Coleoxestia julietae Galileo & Martins, 2007 (Bolivia)
- Coleoxestia kuratai Eya & Chemsak, 2005 (Central America)
- Coleoxestia lissonota Fragoso, 1993 (Central America)
- Coleoxestia moromokoi Galileo & Santos-Silva, 2016
- Coleoxestia nigripes Martins & Monné, 2005 (Argentina and Bolivia)
- Coleoxestia nigropicea (Bates, 1870) (Brazil)
- Coleoxestia nitida (Bates, 1872) (Central and South America)
- Coleoxestia nitidissima Eya & Chemsak, 2005 (Panama)
- Coleoxestia olivieri Fragoso, 1993 (Bolivia, French Guiana, and Brazil)
- Coleoxestia pirrensis Eya & Chemsak, 2005 (Panama)
- Coleoxestia polita (Waterhouse, 1880) (Brazil, Ecuador, and Bolivia)
- Coleoxestia pubicornis (Gounelle, 1909) (Brazil and Bolivia)
- Coleoxestia rachelae Eya & Chemsak, 2005 (Panama and Costa Rica)
- Coleoxestia rafaeli Santos-Silva & Wappes, 2017
- Coleoxestia rubromaculata (Gounelle, 1909) (Central and South America)
- Coleoxestia rufosemivittata Tippmann, 1960 (Bolivia)
- Coleoxestia sanguinipes (Bates, 1884) (Central and South America)
- Coleoxestia semipubescens Melzer, 1923 (Brazil and Paraguay)
- Coleoxestia setigera Melzer, 1926 (Brazil)
- Coleoxestia sobrina Melzer, 1923 (Brazil)
- Coleoxestia spinifemorata Fragoso, 1993 (Brazil and French Guiana)
- Coleoxestia spinipennis (Audinet-Serville, 1834) (South America)
- Coleoxestia spinosa Galileo & Martins, 2010 (Brazil)
- Coleoxestia striatepunctata Eya & Chemsak, 2005 (Panama)
- Coleoxestia thomasi Eya & Chemsak, 2005 (Panama)
- Coleoxestia tupunhuna Martins & Monné, 2005 (Brazil)
- Coleoxestia vittata (Thomson, 1861) (Central and South America)
- Coleoxestia waterhousei (Gounelle, 1909) (South America)
- Coleoxestia weemsi Galileo & Santos-Silva, 2016
