= Peruanus =

Scientific classification
- Kingdom: Animalia
- Phylum: Arthropoda
- Class: Insecta
- Order: Coleoptera
- Suborder: Polyphaga
- Infraorder: Cucujiformia
- Family: Cerambycidae
- Tribe: Cerambycini
- Subtribe: Cerambycina
- Genus: Peruanus; Tippmann, 1960
- Species: P. serricornis

Binomial name
- Peruanus serricornis Tippmann, 1960

Genus of beetles

Peruanus is a genus of longhorn beetles in the family Cerambycidae. This genus has a single species, Peruanus serricornis. It is found in Ecuador and Peru.
