= Melathemma =

Scientific classification
- Domain: Eukaryota
- Kingdom: Animalia
- Phylum: Arthropoda
- Class: Insecta
- Order: Coleoptera
- Suborder: Polyphaga
- Infraorder: Cucujiformia
- Family: Cerambycidae
- Tribe: Cerambycini
- Subtribe: Sphallotrichina
- Genus: Melathemma; Bates, 1870
- Species: M. polita

Binomial name
- Melathemma polita Bates, 1870

Genus of beetles

Melathemma is a genus of longhorn beetles in the family Cerambycidae. This genus has a single species, Melathemma polita. It is found in Brazil and Ecuador.
