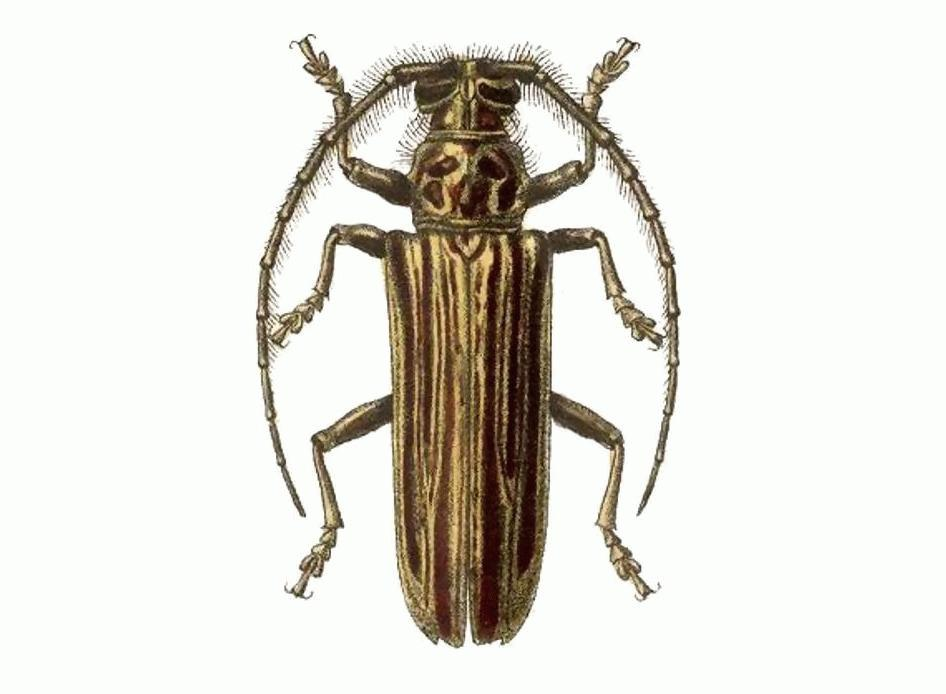

Scientific classification
- Domain: Eukaryota
- Kingdom: Animalia
- Phylum: Arthropoda
- Class: Insecta
- Order: Coleoptera
- Suborder: Polyphaga
- Infraorder: Cucujiformia
- Family: Cerambycidae
- Subfamily: Cerambycinae
- Tribe: Cerambycini
- Genus: Sphallenopsis; Fragoso, 1981
- Species: S. pilosovittata

Binomial name
- Sphallenopsis pilosovittata (Bates, 1872)

= Sphallenopsis =

Genus of beetles

Sphallenopsis is a genus of longhorn beetles in the family Cerambycidae. This genus has a single species, Sphallenopsis pilosovittata. It is found in Nicaragua and Panama.
