= Coleoxestia polita =

Scientific classification
- Kingdom: Animalia
- Phylum: Arthropoda
- Class: Insecta
- Order: Coleoptera
- Suborder: Polyphaga
- Infraorder: Cucujiformia
- Family: Cerambycidae
- Genus: Coleoxestia
- Species: C. polita

Binomial name
- Coleoxestia polita (Waterhouse, 1880)

Species of beetle

Coleoxestia polita is a species of beetle in the family Cerambycidae. It is endemic to Ecuador, Brazil, and Bolivia.

== Description ==
C. polita is approximately 25.4 millimeters in length, and contain antennae about the length of its elytra. Its Thorax is described by Charles Waterhouse as "as long as broad, subcylindrical (scarcely at all arcuate at the sides), constricted at the extreme base and apex, in the usual way, with coarse close punctures at the sides." He continues in describing its dorsal ridges as, "rather regular and carried evenly across the disk, which is not impressed." It has a shorter zigzag striation along its punctuation, found near the base. Its elytron has two small spines near the tip.

== Distribution and habitat ==
C. polita is found within Ecuador, Brazil, and Bolivia. The preserved specimen of this species was found in Sayayacu, Pastaza, Ecuador.
