= Bothrocerambyx =

Bothrocerambyx nevermanni

Scientific classification
- Kingdom: Animalia
- Phylum: Arthropoda
- Clade: Pancrustacea
- Class: Insecta
- Order: Coleoptera
- Suborder: Polyphaga
- Infraorder: Cucujiformia
- Family: Cerambycidae
- Genus: Bothrocerambyx
- Species: B. nevermanni

Binomial name
- Bothrocerambyx nevermanni Schwarzer, 1929

Genus of beetles

Bothrocerambyx nevermanni is a species of beetle in the family Cerambycidae, the only species in the genus Bothrocerambyx. They can be found in Colombia, Costa Rica, Ecuador, and Panama.
