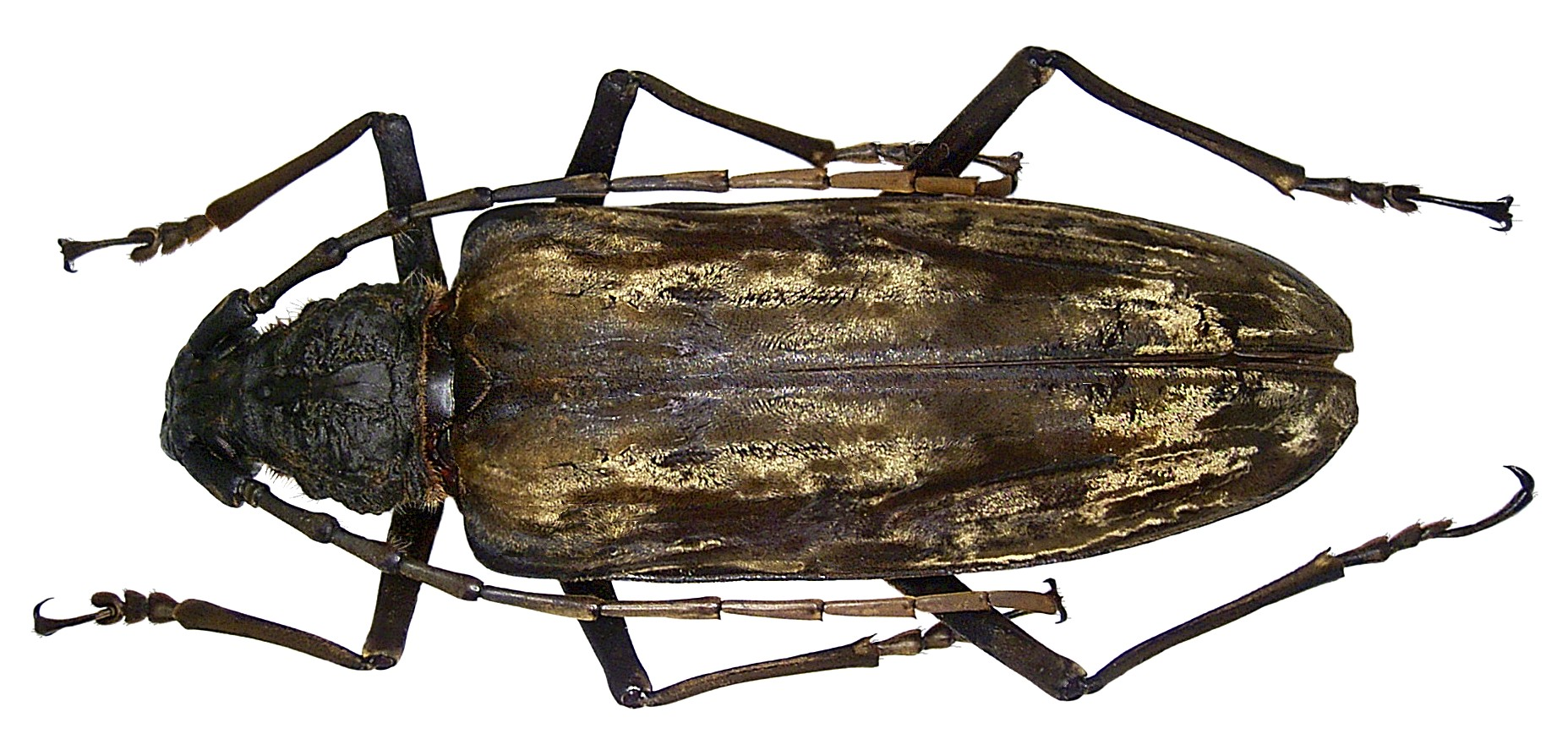
- Neocerambyx gigas

Scientific classification
- Domain: Eukaryota
- Kingdom: Animalia
- Phylum: Arthropoda
- Class: Insecta
- Order: Coleoptera
- Suborder: Polyphaga
- Infraorder: Cucujiformia
- Family: Cerambycidae
- Subfamily: Cerambycinae
- Tribe: Cerambycini
- Genus: Neocerambyx; Thomson, 1861

Synonyms
- Bulbocerambyx Lazarev, 2019; Falsomassicus Pic, 1945; Mallambyx Bates, 1873; Mesocerambyx Breuning & Itzinger, 1943

= Neocerambyx =

Genus of beetles

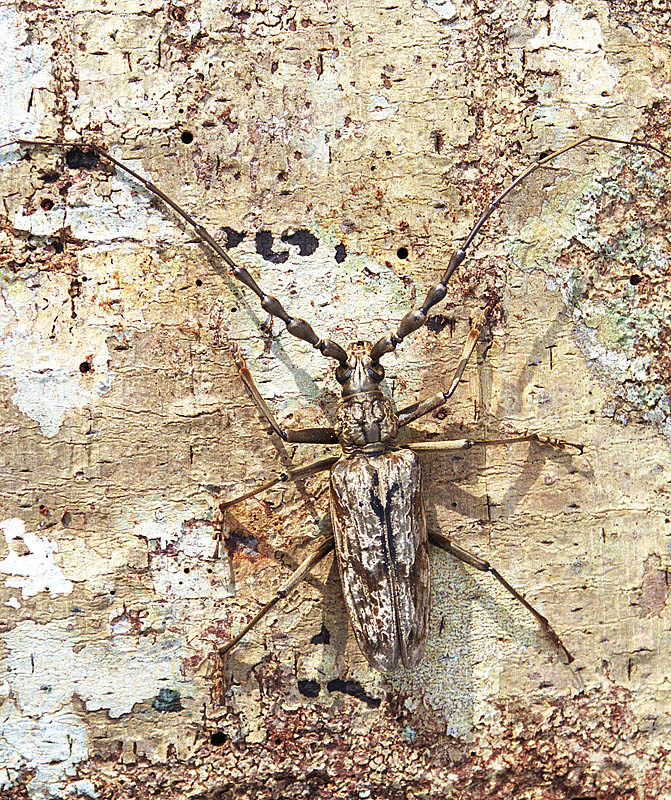
Neocerambyx gigas

Neocerambyx is a genus of round-necked longhorn beetles of the subfamily Cerambycinae. There are more than 20 species of Neocerambyx, found in South, Southeast, and East Asia.

== Species ==
These 24 species belong to the genus Neocerambyx:

- Neocerambyx atratulus (Holzschuh, 2018)
- Neocerambyx bakboensis Miroshnikov, 2018 (Vietnam)
- Neocerambyx brudermanni Holzschuh, 2020
- Neocerambyx dierli (Heyrovský, 1976)
- Neocerambyx elenae Lazarev, 2019 (China (Hainan))
- Neocerambyx gigas (Thomson, 1878) (Indonesia, Malaysia, Thailand, Borneo, Java)
- Neocerambyx gracilipes Jacquot, 2020
- Neocerambyx grandis Gahan, 1891 (South, Southeast Asia)
- Neocerambyx katarinae Holzschuh, 2009 (Laos, China)
- Neocerambyx luzonicus Hüdepohl, 1987 (Philippines, Borneo, Sumatra, Malaysia)
- Neocerambyx melas (Holzschuh, 2021)
- Neocerambyx opulentus Holzschuh, 1998 (Sri Lanka)
- Neocerambyx paris (Wiedemann, 1821) (Nepal, India, Southeast Asia)
- Neocerambyx paulae Miroshnikov, 2021
- Neocerambyx pellitus (Itzinger, 1943) (Thailand, Myanmar, Malaysia)
- Neocerambyx pubescens Fisher, 1936 (Java)
- Neocerambyx punctulifer Holzschuh, 2020
- Neocerambyx raddei Blessig, 1872 (East Asia)
- Neocerambyx rugicollis (Gressitt, 1948)
- Neocerambyx sabinae Holzschuh, 2020
- Neocerambyx theresae (Pic, 1946)
- Neocerambyx unicolor (Gahan, 1906)
- Neocerambyx vitalisi Pic, 1923 (China, Laos, Vietnam, Borneo)
- Neocerambyx zubrzyckii Miroshnikov, 2021
