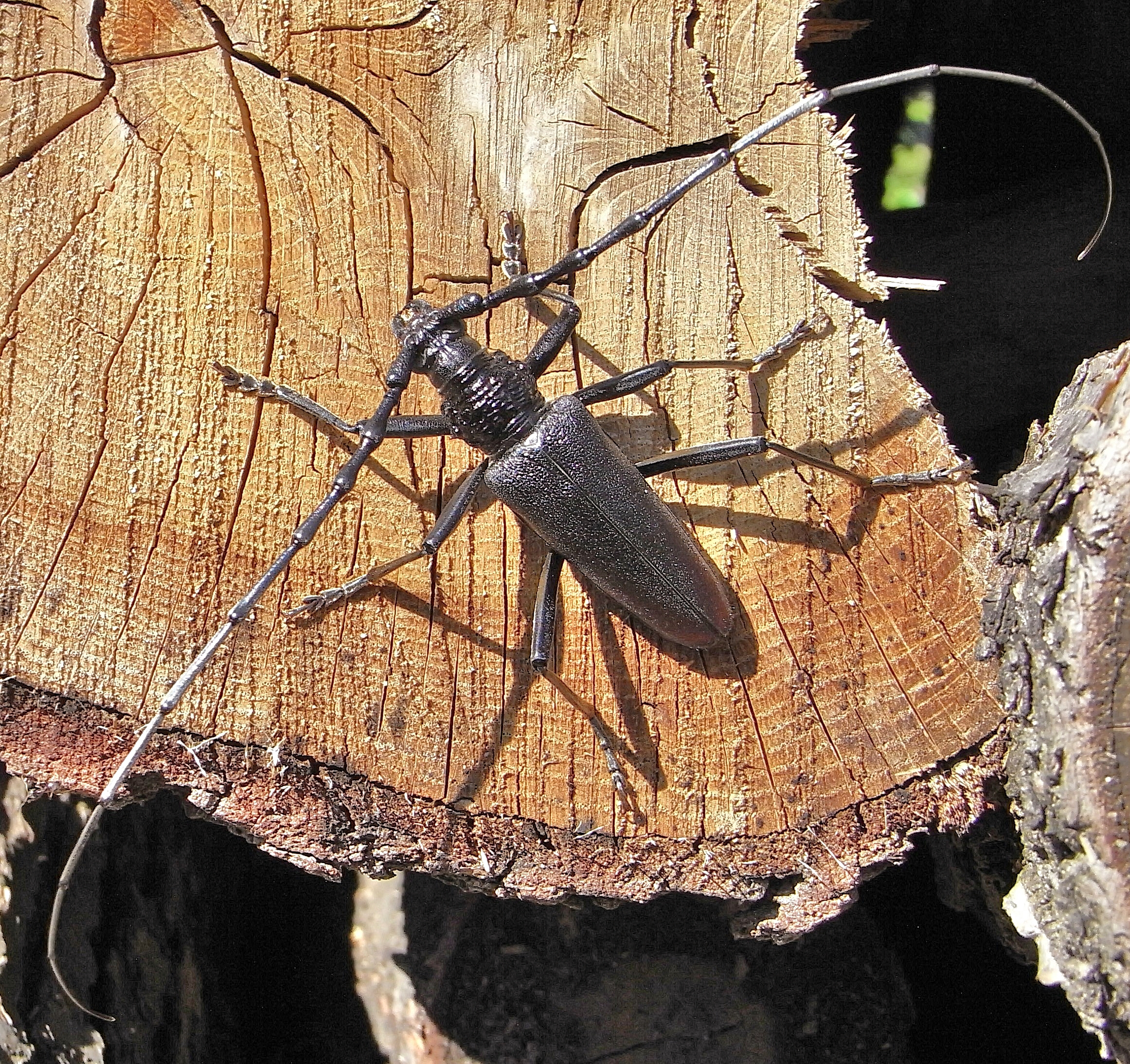
- Cerambyx cerdo from the Mátra, Hungary

Scientific classification
- Kingdom: Animalia
- Phylum: Arthropoda
- Class: Insecta
- Order: Coleoptera
- Suborder: Polyphaga
- Infraorder: Cucujiformia
- Family: Cerambycidae
- Subfamily: Cerambycinae
- Tribe: Cerambycini; Latreille, 1802

Type genus
- Cerambyx Linnaeus, 1758

Synonyms
- Cerambycina Latreille, 1804; Cérambyçaires Mulsant, 1839; Cérambycitae verae Thomson, 1860; Cerambycites Fairmaire, 1864; Cerambycina Thomson, 1866; Cérambycides virais Lacordaire, 1869; Sphallotrichina Martins & Monné, 2002

= Cerambycini =

Tribe of beetles

Cerambycini is a tribe of longhorn beetles classified under the subfamily Cerambycinae.

== Description ==
Members of Cerambycini are generally large reddish-brown beetles with elongated bodies. The frons have pronounced furrows. The eyes are large, coarsely faceted, and deeply curving inwards. The antennae are generally long, with the segments closest to the body exhibiting thickening at their apical ends. The pronotum is ridged across or diagonally, usually with spines or other sharp projections at the sides. The elytra are thinly covered in hair and are rectangular or slightly tapering. The claws are prominent.

== Distribution ==
Members of Cerambycini are abundant in tropical regions and are more or less cosmopolitan in distribution.

== Genera ==
The following genera are classified within the tribe Cerambycini:

1. Aeolesthes Gahan, 1890
2. Allodissus Schwarzer, 1926
3. Amphelictus Bates, 1884
4. Anarchambyx Sama, 2007
5. Archaeopalus Vitali, Gouverneur & Chemin, 2017
6. Atiaia Martins & Monné, 2002
7. Bolbotritus Bates, 1871
8. Bothrocerambyx Schwarzer, 1929
9. Bulbocerambyx Lazarev, 2019
10. Butherium Bates, 1870
11. Calocerambyx Heller, 1905
12. Calpazia Pascoe, 1857
13. Carinolesthes Vitali, Gouverneur & Chemin, 2017
14. Cerambyx (Linnaeus, 1758)
15. Cevaeria Tavakilian, 2003
16. Coelodon Audinet-Serville, 1832
17. Coelodoniella Adlbauer, 2005
18. Coleoxestia Aurivillius, 1912
19. Coniolachnus Fairmaire, 1898
20. Criodion Audinet-Serville, 1833
21. Cyriopalus Pascoe, 1866
22. Derolus Gahan, 1891
23. Derolydnus Hüdepohl, 1989
24. Dialeges Pascoe, 1856
25. Diorthus Gahan, 1891
26. Dissaporus Aurivillius, 1907
27. Dissopachys Reitter, 1886
28. Djabiria Duvivier, 1891
29. Dymasius Thomson, 1864
30. Elydnus Pascoe, 1869
31. Falsopachydissus Miroshnikov, 2017
32. Furcaeolesthes Vitali, 2022
33. Gibbocerambyx Pic, 1923
34. Graciliderolus Lepesme & Breuning, 1958
35. Hamaederus Santos-Silva, García & Botero, 2021
36. Hemadius Fairmaire, 1889
37. Hirtobrasilianus Fragoso & Tavakilian, 1958
38. Hoplocerambyx Thomson, 1864
39. Imbrius Pascoe, 1866
40. Ischionorox Aurivillius, 1922
41. Iuati Martins & Galileo, 2010
42. Juiaparus Martins & Monné, 2002
43. Jupoata Martins & Monné, 2002
44. Lachnopterus Thomson, 1864
45. Lamellocerambyx Pic, 1923
46. Laomargites Pic, 1923
47. Lateropalus Vitali, Gouverneur & Chemin, 2017
48. Macrambyx Fragoso, 1982
49. Margites Gahan, 1891
50. Massicus Pascoe, 1867
51. Massirachys Vitali, Gouverneur & Chemin, 2017
52. Melathemma Bates, 1870
53. Metacriodion Fragoso, 1970
54. Micrambyx Kolbe, 1893
55. Microderolus Aurivillius, 1925
56. Microdiastus Jacquot, 2021
57. Microdymasius Pic, 1946
58. Mimimbrius Miroshnikov, 2017
59. Nadezhdiella Plavilstshikov, 1931
60. Neocerambyx Thomson, 1860
61. Neoplocaederus Sama, 1991
62. Ochrodion Fragoso, 1982
63. Odzala Villiers, 1968
64. Omodiastus Haller & Jacquot, 2019
65. Pacholatkoa Holzschuh, 1993
66. Pachydissus Newman, 1838
67. Paracriodion Fragoso, 1982
68. Parasphallenum Fragoso, 1982
69. Paratiaia Dalens & Guiglaris, 2012
70. Pascoetrephus Miroshnikov, 2017
71. Peruanus Tippmann, 1960
72. Plavichydissus Pic, 1946
73. Plocaederus Megerle in Dejean, 1835
74. Pneumida J. Thomson, 1864
75. Poeciloxestia Lane, 1965
76. Potiaxixa Martins & Monné, 2002
77. Prosphilus Thomson, 1864
78. Pseudaeolesthes Plavilstshikov, 1931
79. Pseudopachydissus Pic, 1933
80. Ptycholaemus Chevrolat, 1858
81. Rhytidodera White, 1853
82. Sebasmia Pascoe, 1859
83. Sinopachys Sama, 1999
84. Sphallambyx Fragoso, 1982
85. Sphallenopsis Fragoso, 1981
86. Sphallenum Bates, 1870
87. Sphallopterus Fragoso, 1982
88. Sphallotrichus Fragoso, 1982
89. Spiniderolus Lepesme & Breuning, 1958
90. Spinidymasius Miroshnikov, 2017
91. Striatoptycholaemus Lepesme & Breuning, 1956
92. Sudreana Adlbauer, 2006
93. Tapinolachnus Thomson, 1864
94. Taurotagiella Bjørnstad, 2013
95. Taurotagus Lacordaire, 1869
96. Teraschema Thomson, 1860
97. Trachylophus Gahan, 1888
98. Trirachys Hope, 1841
99. Utopia J. Thomson, 1864
100. Xenoderolus Sama, 2007
101. Xenopachys Sama, 1999
102. Xestiodion Fragoso, 1981
103. Xoanodera Pascoe, 1857
104. Xoanotrephus Hüdepohl, 1989
105. Zatrephus Pascoe, 1857
106. Zegriades Pascoe, 1869
