= A. bicolor =

A. bicolor may refer to:

- Abacetus bicolor, a ground beetle
- Abantis bicolor, the bicoloured skipper, a butterfly found in South Africa
- Abanycha bicolor, a longhorn beetle found in Ecuador
  - Amphionycha bicolor, a synonym of Abanycha bicolor
- Acalolepta bicolor, a longhorn beetle found in Malaysia and Borneo
- Acanthoderes bicolor, a longhorn beetle
- Acanthophippium bicolor, an orchid found in India, Sri Lanka, and New Guinea
  - Acanthephippium bicolor, a synonym of Acanthophippium bicolor
- Acer bicolor, a synonym of Acer sinense, a maple tree found in China
- Achillea bicolor, a synonym of Acer sinense, yarrow, a plant native to the Northern Hemisphere
- Acia bicolor, a synonym of Resinicium bicolor, a fungus that infects Douglas firs
- Acidanthera bicolor, a synonym of Gladiolus murielae, a plant native to eastern Africa
- Acleris bicolor, a moth found in Japan
- Acontias bicolor, a lizard found in Zimbabwe
- Acrida bicolor, a grasshopper found in Africa, the Middle East, and southern Europe
- Acronicta bicolor, a moth found in South Asia
  - Acronycta bicolor, a synonym of Acronicta bicolor
- Acrosticta bicolor, a picture-winged fly
- Adenanthera bicolor, a plant found in Malaysia and Sri Lanka
- Adenocaulon bicolor, the American trailplant
- Adesmus bicolor, a longhorn beetle
- Adotela bicolor, a ground beetle found in Australia
- Adromischus bicolor, a plant found in South Africa
- Aechmea bicolor, a synonym of Wittmackia bicolor, a plant found in Brazil
- Afrodromia bicolor, a dagger fly
- Agabus bicolor, a predaceous diving beetle found in North America
- Agaone bicolor, a longhorn beetle
- Agonum bicolor, a ground beetle found in Japan, Kazakhstan, Mongolia, and Russia, as well as Alaska and Canada
- Agrotis bicolor, a synonym of Noctubourgognea bicolor, a moth found in South America
- Agulla bicolor, a snakefly found in North America
- Alimera bicolor, a synonym of Edebessa bicolor, a moth found in Suriname and French Guiana
- Allocota bicolor, a ground beetle found in Asia
- Alloesia bicolor, a longhorn beetle
- Allogaster bicolor, a longhorn beetle found in the Congo
- Alopoglossus bicolor, Werner's largescale lizard, found in Colombia
- Amastus bicolor, a moth found in Ecuador and Peru
- Amata bicolor, a moth found in Australia
- Amaurornis bicolor, a synonym of Zapornia bicolor, the black-tailed crake, a bird found in Asia
- Amphelictus bicolor, a longhorn beetle found in Panama, Costa Rica, and Mexico
- Amphiprion bicolor, a synonym of Amphiprion ocellaris, the ocellaris clownfish
- Ampliglossum bicolor, a synonym of Oncidium bicolor, a plant found in Venezuela and Brazil
- Ancylocera bicolor, a longhorn beetle
- Andrena bicolor, Gwynne's mining bee, found in the Western Palearctic
- Androctonus bicolor, the black fat-tailed scorpion, found in North and West Africa and the Middle East
- Andropogon bicolor, a synonym of Sorghum bicolor, commonly called sorghum
- Anerastia bicolor, a synonym of Seleucia pectinella, a snout moth found in the Mediterranean region
- Anguilla bicolor, an eel found in India and Indonesia
- Anguis bicolor, a synonym of Anguis veronensis, the Italian slow worm, a lizard found in Italy and France
- Anigozanthos bicolor, a plant found in Australia
- Anilios bicolor, the dark-spined blind snake, found in Australia
- Anopina bicolor, a moth found in Costa Rica
- Anoplophytum bicolor, a synonym of Tillandsia stricta, a plant native to South America and Trinidad
- Antaeotricha bicolor, a moth found in Brazil
- Anthidium bicolor, a synonym of Bathanthidium bicolor, a megachilid bee
- Anthrenocerus bicolor, a skin beetle native to Australia
- Apantesis bicolor, a moth found in the Bahamas
- Apriona bicolor, a synonym of Apriona sublaevis, a longhorn beetle found in Asia
- Argyrophis bicolor, a synonym of Argyrophis diardii, a blind snake found in South and Southeast Asia
- Ariadna bicolor, a tube-dwelling spider found in North America
- Arrothia bicolor, a moth native to Madagascar
- Arthroleptella bicolor, the Bainskloof moss frog, an amphibian found in South Africa
- Arum bicolor, a synonym of Caladium bicolor, called Heart of Jesus, a plant native to Latin America
- Asparus bicolor, a moth found in South Africa
- Aspergillus bicolor, a fungus
- Astata bicolor, a wasp found in Central and North America
- Aster bicolor, a synonym of Solidago bicolor, the white goldenrod, a plant native to eastern North America
- Astur bicolor, the bicolored hawk, found in Mexico, Central America, and South America
  - Accipiter bicolor, a synonym of Astur bicolor
- Asura bicolor, a synonym of Phlogomera bicolor, a moth found in New Guinea
- Atelopus bicolor, a synonym of Atelopus boulengeri, Boulenger's stubfoot toad, an amphibian found in Ecuador
- Athous bicolor, a click beetle found in Europe
- Attagenus bicolor, a carpet beetle found in the United States
- Atylotus bicolor, a horse fly found in the United States
- Atypus bicolor, a synonym of Sphodros rufipes, the red legged purseweb spider, found in North America
- Aulidiotis bicolor, a moth found in Japan
- Avicennia bicolor, a mangrove found in the Tropical Eastern Pacific
