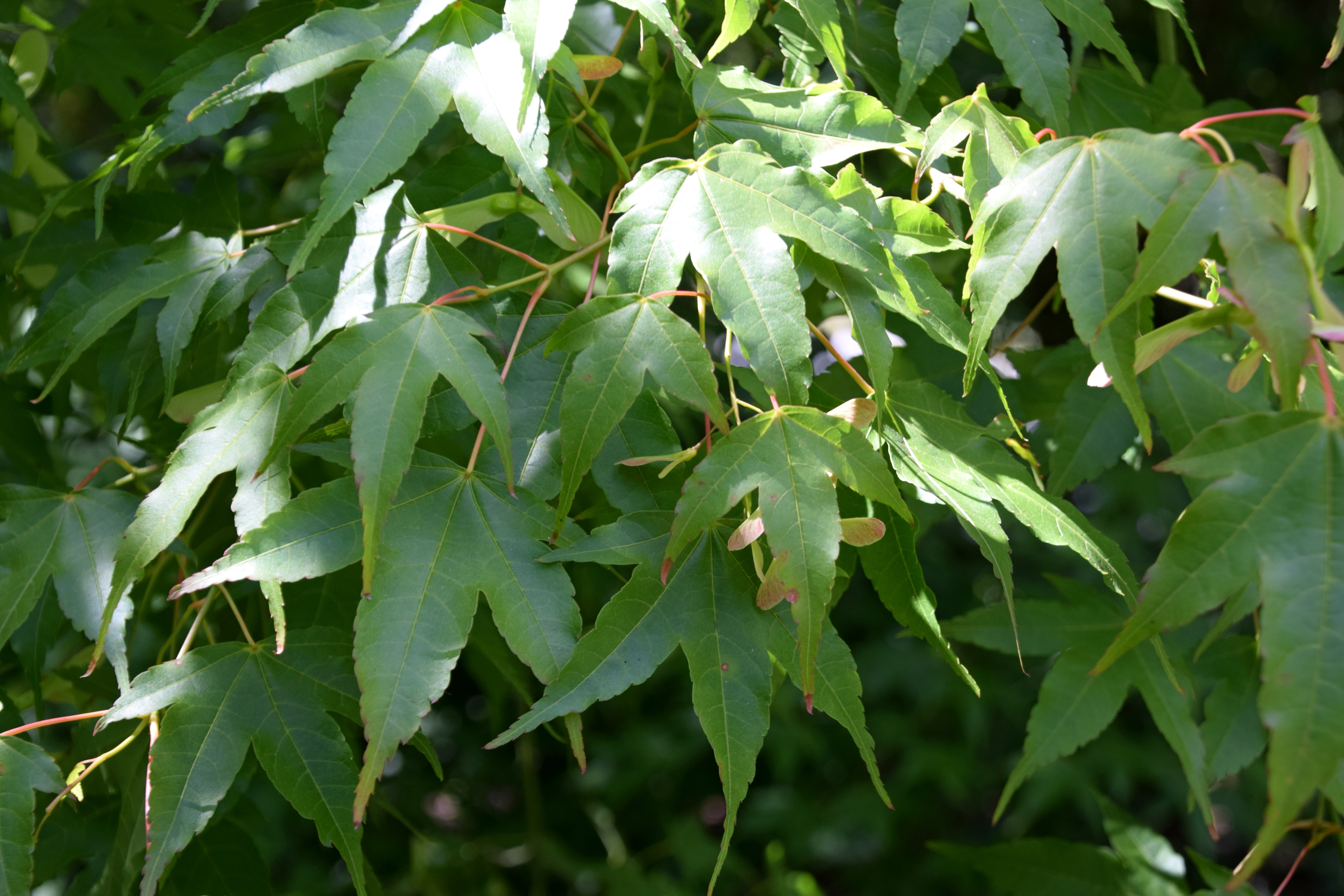
- Acer sinense in Christchurch Botanic Gardens

Scientific classification
- Kingdom: Plantae
- Clade: Embryophytes
- Clade: Tracheophytes
- Clade: Spermatophytes
- Clade: Angiosperms
- Clade: Eudicots
- Clade: Rosids
- Order: Sapindales
- Family: Sapindaceae
- Genus: Acer
- Section: Acer sect. Palmata
- Series: Acer ser. Palmata
- Species: A. sinense

Binomial name
- Acer sinense Pax

Synonyms
- List: Acer bicolor F.Chun; Acer bicolor var. serratifolium (W.P.Fang) W.P.Fang; Acer brachystephanum T.Z.Hsu; Acer campbellii subsp. sinense (Pax) P.C.de Jong; Acer prolificum W.P.Fang & M.Y.Fang; Acer sinense var. undulatum W.P.Fang & Y.T.Wu; Acer sunyiense W.P.Fang; Acer wilsonii var. longicaudatum (W.P.Fang) W.P.Fang

= Acer sinense =

Species of flowering plant

Acer sinense is a species of flowering plant in the maple genus Acer, native to southeast and south-central China. A small (typically 3 to 5 m tall) tree rarely reaching 15 m, it prefers to grow in forested valleys 500 to 2500 m above sea level.

It is a highly morphologically variable species, leading to some taxonomic confusion. Some authorities consider it to be a subspecies of Campbell's maple, Acer campbellii subsp. sinense, but this is incorrect; it is in its own species complex. Good traits to distinguish it from members of the Acer wilsonii species complex are that its inflorescence is a compound corymbose panicle with 60 to 70 flowers, with pedicels that are 5 to 6 mm long, its ovaries are pilose, appearing white, and its nutlet is nearly glabrous, and convex, without any veins.
