= Acer flabellatum =

Acer flabellatum can refer to:

- Acer flabellatum Greene, a synonym of Acer macrophyllum Pursh
- Acer flabellatum Rehder, a synonym of Acer campbellii subsp. flabellatum (Rehder) A.E.Murray
