= Anna Maria Walker =

British botanist and scientific illustrator (1778-1852)

- Born: 1778; Kinaldy, Fife, Scotland
- Died: 1852 (aged 73–74); Mangalore, India
- Resting place: St Paul's Church graveyard, Mangalore
- Known for: botanist, plant collector, botanical artist
- Spouse: George Warren Walker
- Children: seven
- Parent(s): Colonel Robert Patton and Constantia Adriana Sally Mapletoft

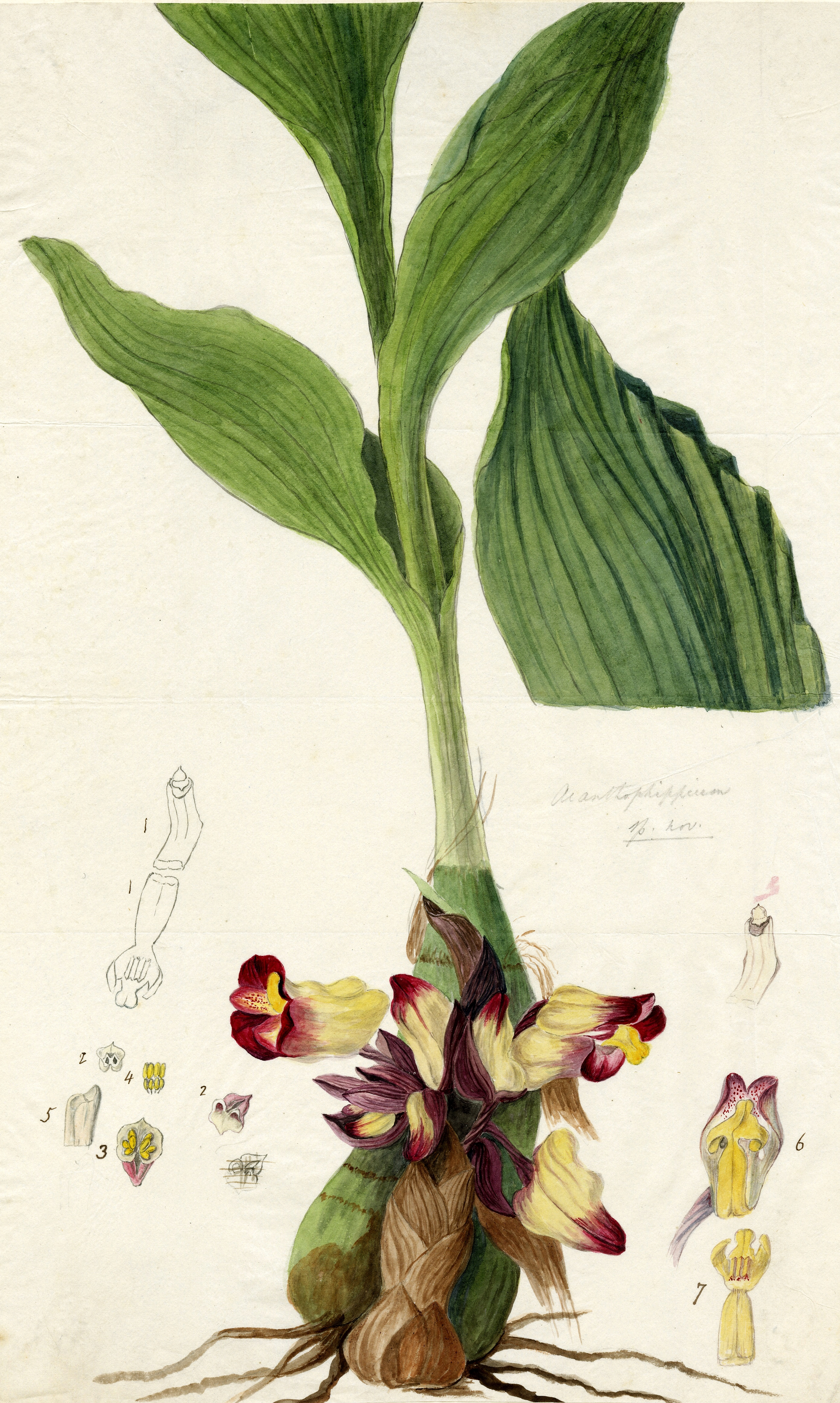
Watercolour by Anna Maria Walker of Acanthephippium bicolor

Anna Maria Walker (née Patton) (c. 1778–1852) and her husband Colonel George Warren Walker (1778–1843) were Scottish botanists in Ceylon (now Sri Lanka) who made extensive collections of plants between 1830 and 1838. Several species of ferns and orchids were named after them by Sir William Jackson Hooker with whom they corresponded. They also corresponded with and collaborated with other botanists in the region such as Robert Wight. Anna Maria was also an excellent botanical artist who illustrated many species of orchids. Plant species named after them include Vanilla walkeriae, Liparis walkeriae and Thrixspermum walkeri.

== Biographies ==
Anna Maria Patton was probably born in 1778 at Kinaldy, Fife, in Scotland. She was the third daughter (of ten) of the 17 children of Constantia Adriana Sally Mapletoft and Colonel Robert Patton. Patton had been Military Secretary to three Governors-General of India, the last being Warren Hastings, and made enough money to buy Kinaldy, returning to family roots – his father Philip Patton was a friend of Adam Smith, having been Collector of Customs at Kirkcaldy. In 1797 the Pattons moved to Castle Street, Edinburgh, where they entered literary society and Anna attended the sermons of Rev. Sydney Smith. His finances depleted, Kinaldy was let out and Colonel Patton was appointed Governor of the south Atlantic island of St Helena in 1801; Anna Maria and her sisters Sarah and Jessy, accompanied him as housekeepers. There the sisters met distinguished passers-by including Lord Valentia and his artist Henry Salt; her father appointed William John Burchell as the island's botanist – so Anna Maria may well have got some early botanical and artistic training in St Helena. Her sister Sarah married an army officer who was later to be Sir Henry Torrens while another sister Jessy married John Paterson son of George Paterson, a Madras Nabob who owned Castle Huntly, near Dundee. Hoping to follow their example Anna Maria went to India where she married Captain Walker, and in 1819 they moved to Ceylon. In 1820 Anna Maria climbed Adam's Peak, supposedly the first white woman to do so.

George Warren Walker, was born on 25 March 1778, the sixth son of the Rev. Benjamin Walker, Vicar of Northallerton, Yorkshire and Isabella (née Warren). He entered the British Army in 1799 and was commissioned Lieutenant in the 8th Regiment of (Light) Dragoons (the King's Royal Irish) in 1801 and went with them to India the following year. He saw active service under General Lake in the Second Anglo-Maratha War, and under Major-General Sir Robert Rollo Gillespie in the Anglo-Gurkha War. On 20 July 1809 he married Anna Maria Patton at Chunar in present-day Uttar Pradesh. Promoted Lt. Colonel in 1818, the following year he was appointed Deputy Adjutant General of Ceylon; the Walkers moved there and remained there (apart from a furlough in Britain 1826–9) until October 1838. Walker was then appointed to command the 21st Regiment of North British Fusiliers, which he took over in Madras and accompanied to Bengal. In 1840 he was appointed Brigadier in command of the Meerut Station (by which time he held the rank of Major General on the East Indies establishment), until 1843 when the 21st were transferred to the Madras Presidency. While awaiting a new command he died on 4 December 1843, at St Thomas Mount, Madras, where he was buried. His widow erected a mural tablet in Northallerton church.

== Edinburgh furlough ==
After about six years, the Walkers returned to Britain on furlough, and rented a house in the newly built Carlton Street, close to the Royal Botanic Garden in Edinburgh. They must have been looking for a pastime to occupy their time productively on their return to Ceylon and met both Robert Graham, the University of Edinburgh Professor of Botany and Regius Keeper of the Botanic Garden, and William Jackson Hooker, the Glasgow Professor of Botany. This contact probably induced the couple to take up the task on return of supplying herbarium specimens, seeds, and living plants for the Edinburgh Botanic Garden and for Graham's and Hooker's private herbaria. Colonel Walker who returned first to Ceylon wrote to Anna to learn botanical drawing so that she could record fragile specimens when they started to explore and collect.

== Collecting in Ceylon ==
The Walkers soon started to send large amounts of material back to Edinburgh and Glasgow. These donations are recorded in the letters that accompanied the expensive transmission of specimens, which depended on the goodwill of ships' captains. Hooker and Graham were not generous in acknowledging their contributions although Hooker later gave them books and a microscope in return. The Walkers were based mainly in Colombo, the British HQ on the coast of Ceylon, but had frequent periods at Kandy, in the botanically much more interesting centre of the island. At this time huge road-building activities were being undertaken, as the Kingdom of Kandy had only recently fallen to British control – this allowed access to rich collecting areas, especially around the developing hill station of Nuwara Eliya. The Walkers made two major expeditions: a two-week trip to, and ascent of, Adam's Peak in 1833, and a nine-week tour around the south-west of the Island in 1837. Mrs Walker sent journals of both excursions to Hooker, which he published.

== Taxonomic work on collections ==
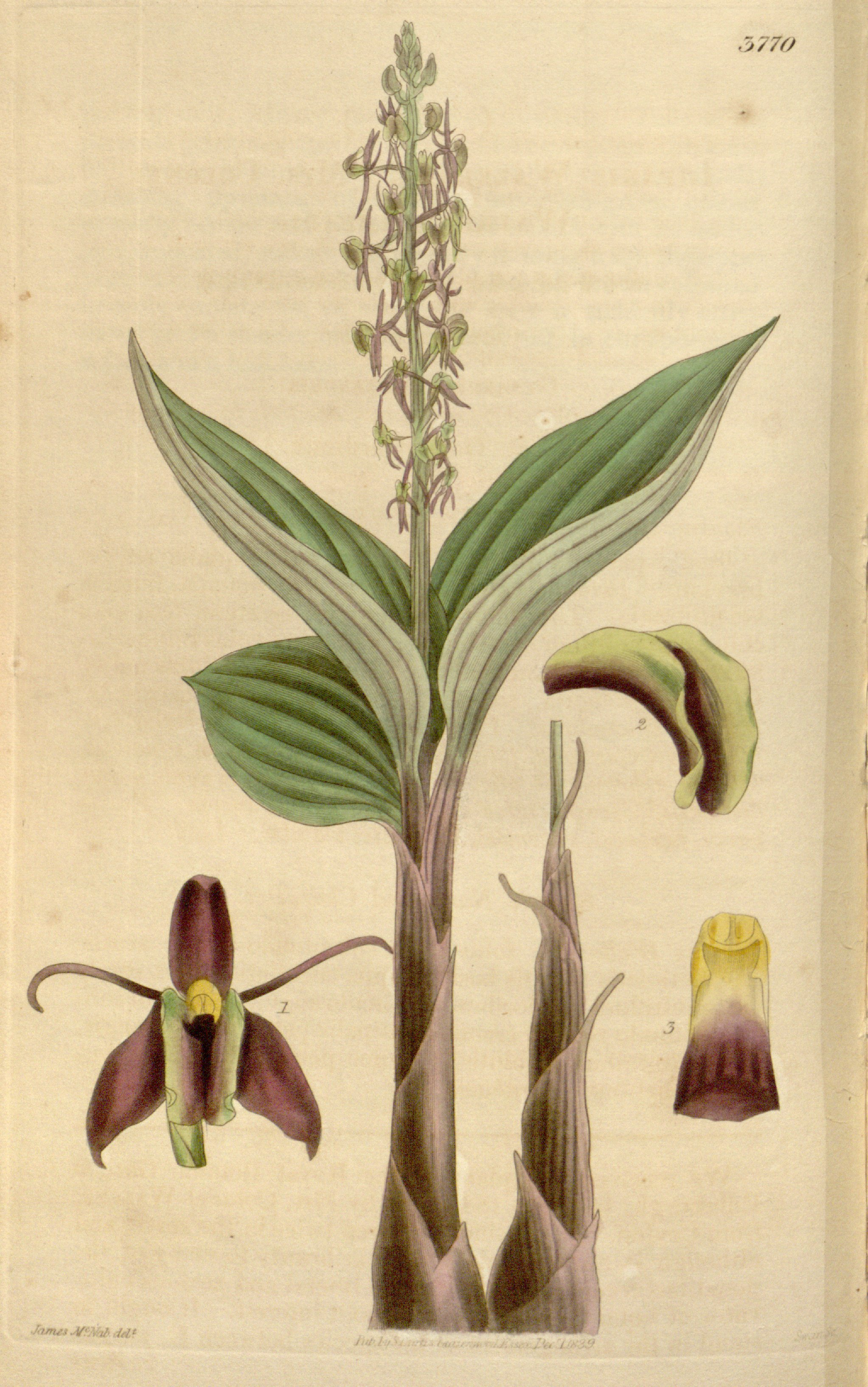
Liparis walkeriae named after Anna Maria by Robert Graham

Hooker and Graham were too busy to work on the collections of Walker and that work was delegated to George Arnott Walker-Arnott, a 'free-lance' botanist to write up the new species of the Walkers' earliest collections. These were published in Latin under the title Pugillus Plantarum Indiae Orientalis, in an obscure German periodical, but first issued as a preprint around April 1837. Several of the new species he described were named after Colonel Walker including Desmodium walkeri (now Desmodium cajanifolium), Sykesia walkeri (now Gaertnera walkeri), Plectranthus walkeri (now Isodon walkeri ), Doronicum walkeri, Senecio walkeri (now Cissampelopsis spelaeicola), Dipsacus walkeri, Hedyotis walkeri, Zornia walkeri and Crotalaria walkeri. Arnott also published a monograph on the many attractive Impatiens discovered by the Walkers, and a paper on Osbeckia and Sonerila, genera of the family Melastomataceae. Hooker published a few of the Walker novelties, and the German botanist Christian Nees von Esenbeck their members of the family Acanthaceae, especially of the genus Strobilanthes in which the Walkers were particularly interested because of its habit of synchronous flowering after gaps of many years. The Walkers' friend Robert Wight, an East India Company surgeon based in South India, who visited them in Ceylon in 1836, also published some of Mrs Walker's drawings, and based new species on their specimens. Other than her two journals Mrs Walker published nothing, and she must have been disappointed that Hooker did nothing with her extremely accurate orchid drawings. Henry Noltie catalogued the type specimens (at RBGE, Kew and Geneva), Mrs Walker's drawings (at RBGE, Kew and the Natural History Museum), and published transcriptions of all the Walker letters to Hooker written between 1829 and 1851 in 2013.

== Last days in India ==
General Walker spent the two years of his military postings in the plains of northern India, and their botanical interests were reduced and their occasional ventures included an excursion to Mussoorie in the Himalayan foothills in June 1841. From here they sent specimens to Hooker, but these were probably of well-known species as Hooker did nothing with then and did not publish her long letter about this excursion. After General Walker's death, Anna Maria remained in India where four of their seven children were based – her sons in military or civil employment. Her last days were spent in Mangalore, on the Malabar Coast, with her son Warren, where she died, aged 74, on 8 September 1852; her tomb survives in the graveyard of St Paul's church.

== Publications ==
- [Walker, A.W] (1835). "Journal of an ascent to the summit of Adam's Peak, Ceylon". Companion to the Botanical Magazine. 1: 3–14.
- Walker, A.W[arren] (1840). Journal of a tour in Ceylon. Journal of Botany 2: 223–56.
