= Agaone =

Scientific classification
- Domain: Eukaryota
- Kingdom: Animalia
- Phylum: Arthropoda
- Class: Insecta
- Order: Coleoptera
- Suborder: Polyphaga
- Infraorder: Cucujiformia
- Family: Cerambycidae
- Tribe: Rhinotragini
- Genus: Agaone

Genus of beetles

Agaone is a genus of beetles in the family Cerambycidae, containing the following species:

- Agaone amazonica Bezark, Santos-Silva & Martins, 2011
- Agaone bicolor (Linsley, 1934)
- Agaone notabilis (White, 1855)
- Agaone peruviensis (Fisher, 1952)
- Agaone punctilla Martins & Santos-Silva, 2010
