= Amphelictus fuscipennis =

Scientific classification
- Kingdom: Animalia
- Phylum: Arthropoda
- Class: Insecta
- Order: Coleoptera
- Suborder: Polyphaga
- Infraorder: Cucujiformia
- Family: Cerambycidae
- Subfamily: Cerambycinae
- Tribe: Cerambycini
- Genus: Amphelictus
- Species: A. fuscipennis

Binomial name
- Amphelictus fuscipennis Eya & Chemsak, 2003

Synonyms
- Amphelictus novellus Monné & Hovore, 2006

Species of beetle

Amphelictus fuscipennis is a species in the longhorn beetle family Cerambycidae. It is found in Colombia.
