= Abanycha pulchricollis =

Scientific classification
- Domain: Eukaryota
- Kingdom: Animalia
- Phylum: Arthropoda
- Class: Insecta
- Order: Coleoptera
- Suborder: Polyphaga
- Infraorder: Cucujiformia
- Family: Cerambycidae
- Tribe: Hemilophini
- Genus: Abanycha
- Species: A. pulchricollis

Binomial name
- Abanycha pulchricollis (Bates, 1885)

Synonyms
- Adesmus pulchricollis Aurivillius, 1923; Amphionycha pulchricollis Bates, 1885

Species of beetle

Abanycha pulchricollis is a species of beetle in the family Cerambycidae. It was described by Henry Walter Bates in 1885. It is known from Guatemala.
