= Aulidiotis phoxopterella =

Scientific classification
- Kingdom: Animalia
- Phylum: Arthropoda
- Class: Insecta
- Order: Lepidoptera
- Family: Gelechiidae
- Genus: Aulidiotis
- Species: A. phoxopterella

Binomial name
- Aulidiotis phoxopterella (Snellen, 1903)

Synonyms
- Ceratophora phoxopterella Snellen, 1903

Species of moth

Aulidiotis phoxopterella is a species of moth in the family Gelechiidae. It was described by Snellen in 1903. It is found in Indonesia (Java) and India.

The wingspan is about 19 mm for males and 16 mm females. The forewings are shining greyish-brown, but yellowish in the middle. The hindwings are dirty white.
