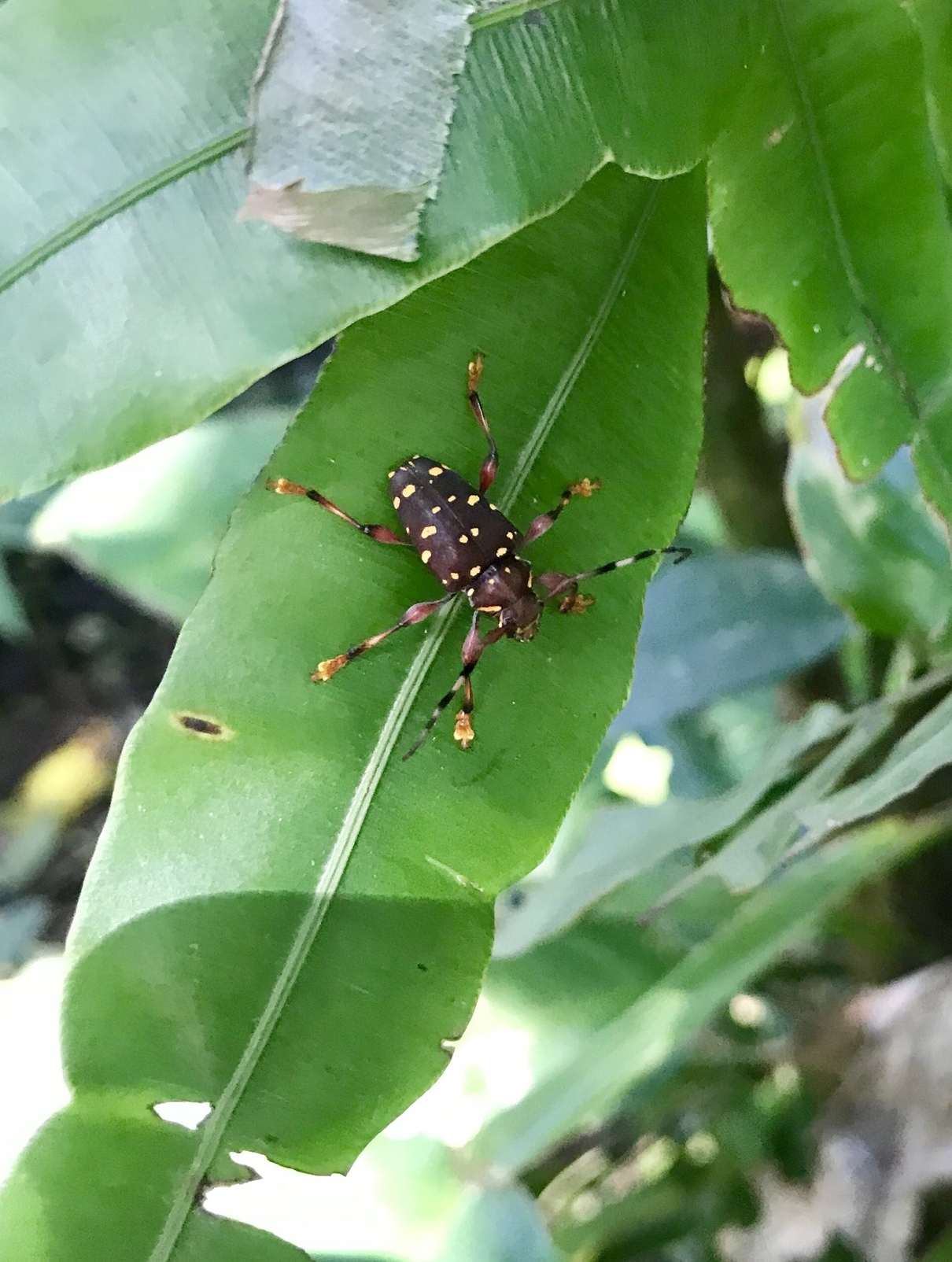

Scientific classification
- Kingdom: Animalia
- Phylum: Arthropoda
- Class: Insecta
- Order: Coleoptera
- Suborder: Polyphaga
- Infraorder: Cucujiformia
- Family: Cerambycidae
- Genus: Acanthoderes
- Species: A. rubripes

Binomial name
- Acanthoderes rubripes Bates, 1872

= Acanthoderes rubripes =

Species of beetle

Acanthoderes rubripes is a species of beetle in the family Cerambycidae. It was described by Henry Walter Bates in 1872. This species has been observed in the Chontales Department in Nicaragua as well as at Volcan de Chiriqui and Bugaba in Panama.
