= Alloesia chlorophana =

Scientific classification
- Domain: Eukaryota
- Kingdom: Animalia
- Phylum: Arthropoda
- Class: Insecta
- Order: Coleoptera
- Suborder: Polyphaga
- Infraorder: Cucujiformia
- Family: Cerambycidae
- Genus: Alloesia
- Species: A. chlorophana

Binomial name
- Alloesia chlorophana Chevrolat, 1862

Species of beetle

Alloesia chlorophana is a species of beetle in the family Cerambycidae. It was described by Louis Alexandre Auguste Chevrolat in 1862.
