= Acanthoderes laportei =

Scientific classification
- Kingdom: Animalia
- Phylum: Arthropoda
- Class: Insecta
- Order: Coleoptera
- Suborder: Polyphaga
- Infraorder: Cucujiformia
- Family: Cerambycidae
- Genus: Acanthoderes
- Species: A. laportei

Binomial name
- Acanthoderes laportei Aurivillius, 1923

Species of beetle

Acanthoderes laportei is a species of beetle in the family Cerambycidae. It was described by Per Olof Christopher Aurivillius in 1923.
