= Alloesia vittata =

Scientific classification
- Kingdom: Animalia
- Phylum: Arthropoda
- Class: Insecta
- Order: Coleoptera
- Suborder: Polyphaga
- Infraorder: Cucujiformia
- Family: Cerambycidae
- Genus: Alloesia
- Species: A. vittata

Binomial name
- Alloesia vittata (Fabricius, 1801)

Species of beetle

Alloesia vittata is a species of beetle in the family Cerambycidae. It was described by Johan Christian Fabricius in 1801.
