= Agaone notabilis =

Scientific classification
- Domain: Eukaryota
- Kingdom: Animalia
- Phylum: Arthropoda
- Class: Insecta
- Order: Coleoptera
- Suborder: Polyphaga
- Infraorder: Cucujiformia
- Family: Cerambycidae
- Genus: Agaone
- Species: A. notabilis

Binomial name
- Agaone notabilis (White, 1855)

Species of beetle

Agaone notabilis is a species of beetle in the family Cerambycidae. It was described by White in 1855.
