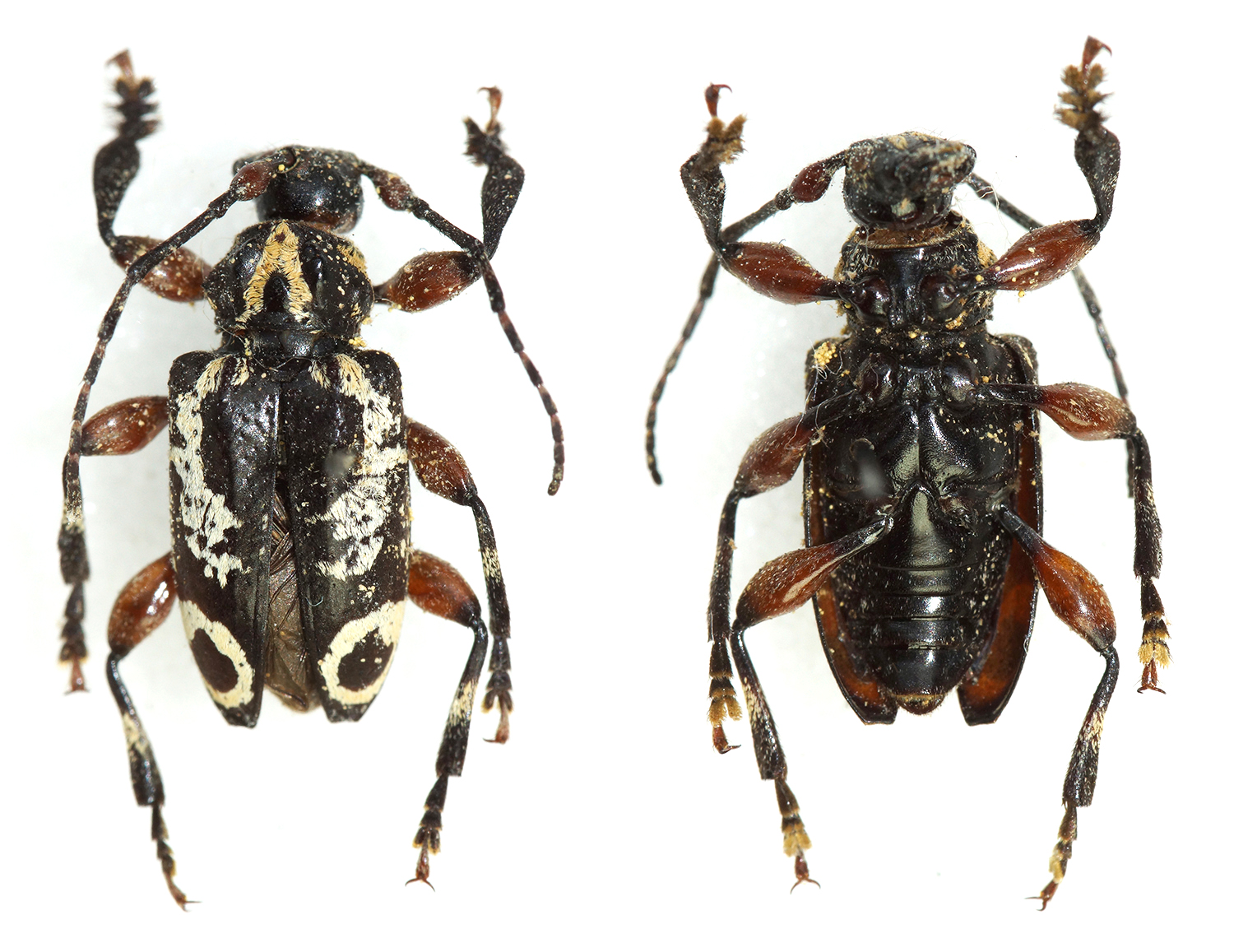

Scientific classification
- Kingdom: Animalia
- Phylum: Arthropoda
- Clade: Pancrustacea
- Class: Insecta
- Order: Coleoptera
- Suborder: Polyphaga
- Infraorder: Cucujiformia
- Family: Cerambycidae
- Genus: Acanthoderes
- Species: A. rufofemorata

Binomial name
- Acanthoderes rufofemorata Aurivillius, 1926

= Acanthoderes rufofemorata =

Species of beetle

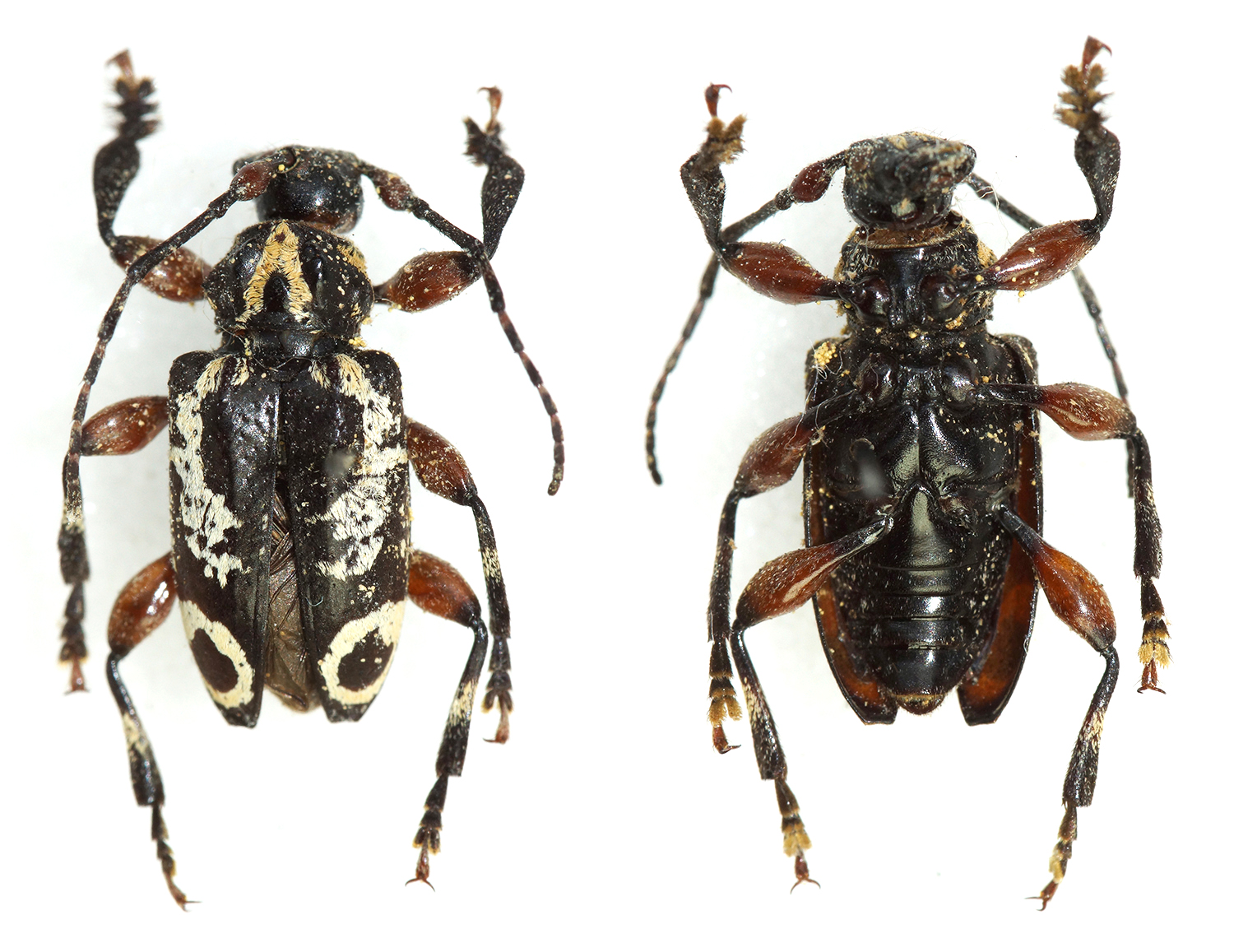

Acanthoderes rufofemorata is a species of beetle in the family Cerambycidae. It was described by Per Olof Christopher Aurivillius in 1926.
