= Acanthoderes quattuordecimguttata =

Scientific classification
- Kingdom: Animalia
- Phylum: Arthropoda
- Class: Insecta
- Order: Coleoptera
- Suborder: Polyphaga
- Infraorder: Cucujiformia
- Family: Cerambycidae
- Genus: Acanthoderes
- Species: A. quattuordecimguttata

Binomial name
- Acanthoderes quattuordecimguttata (Schoenherr, 1817)

Species of beetle

Acanthoderes quattuordecimguttata is a species of beetle in the family Cerambycidae. It was described by Schoenherr in 1817.
