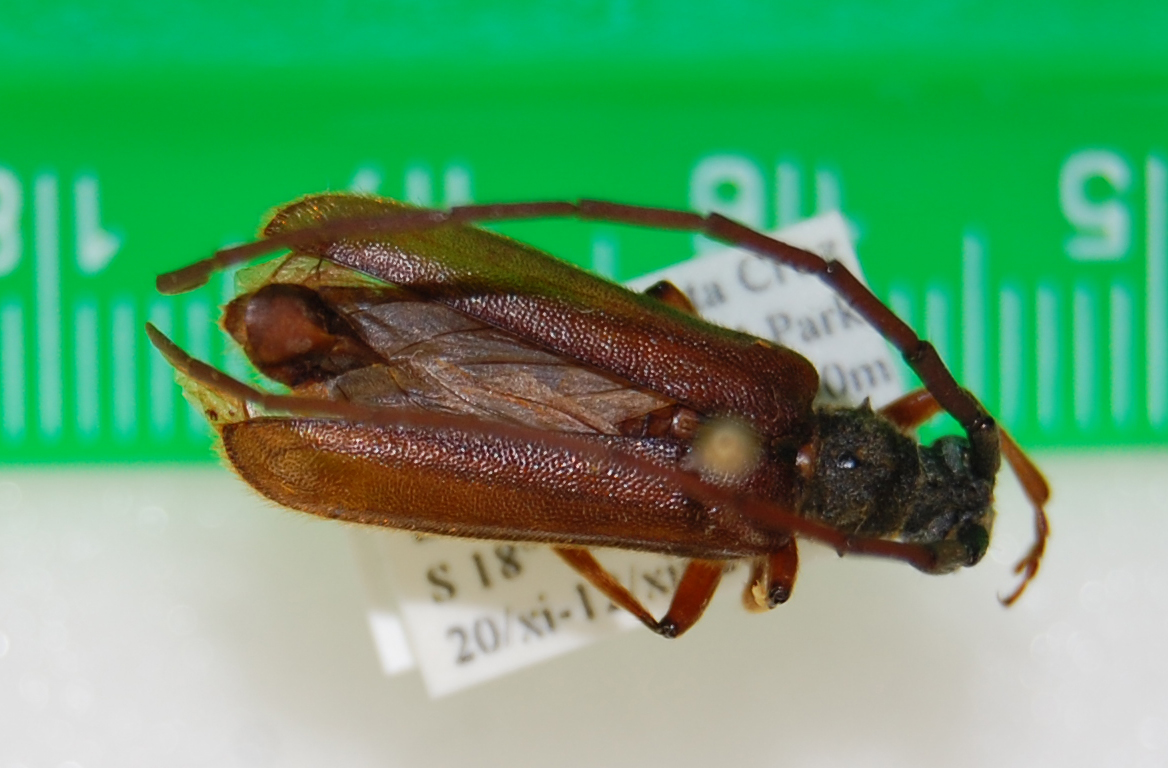

Scientific classification
- Kingdom: Animalia
- Phylum: Arthropoda
- Class: Insecta
- Order: Coleoptera
- Suborder: Polyphaga
- Infraorder: Cucujiformia
- Family: Cerambycidae
- Genus: Amphelictus
- Species: A. castaneus

Binomial name
- Amphelictus castaneus Chemsak & Linsley, 1964

= Amphelictus castaneus =

Species of beetle

Amphelictus castaneus is a species of beetle in the family Cerambycidae. It is found in South America.
