= Abanycha =

Scientific classification
- Kingdom: Animalia
- Phylum: Arthropoda
- Clade: Pancrustacea
- Class: Insecta
- Order: Coleoptera
- Suborder: Polyphaga
- Infraorder: Cucujiformia
- Family: Cerambycidae
- Tribe: Hemilophini
- Genus: Abanycha; Martins & Galileo, 1997

Genus of beetles

Abanycha is a genus of longhorn beetles of the subfamily Lamiinae, containing the following species:

- Abanycha bicolor (Gahan, 1889)
- Abanycha bicoloricornis Galileo & Martins, 2009
- Abanycha fasciata Galileo & Martins, 2005
- Abanycha pectoralis Martins & Galileo, 2004
- Abanycha pulchricollis (Bates, 1885)
- Abanycha sericipennis (Bates, 1885)
- Abanycha urocosmia (Bates, 1881)
