= Acanthoderes septemmaculata =

Scientific classification
- Kingdom: Animalia
- Phylum: Arthropoda
- Class: Insecta
- Order: Coleoptera
- Suborder: Polyphaga
- Infraorder: Cucujiformia
- Family: Cerambycidae
- Genus: Acanthoderes
- Species: A. septemmaculata

Binomial name
- Acanthoderes septemmaculata Buquet, 1859

Species of beetle

Acanthoderes septemmaculata is a species of beetle in the family Cerambycidae. It was described by Buquet in 1859.
