= Amphelictus astales =

Scientific classification
- Kingdom: Animalia
- Phylum: Arthropoda
- Class: Insecta
- Order: Coleoptera
- Suborder: Polyphaga
- Infraorder: Cucujiformia
- Family: Cerambycidae
- Genus: Amphelictus
- Species: A. astales

Binomial name
- Amphelictus astales Martins & Monne, 2005

Species of beetle

Amphelictus astales is a species in the longhorn beetle family Cerambycidae. It is found in Ecuador.
