= Arrothia =

Scientific classification
- Domain: Eukaryota
- Kingdom: Animalia
- Phylum: Arthropoda
- Class: Insecta
- Order: Lepidoptera
- Superfamily: Noctuoidea
- Family: Noctuidae
- Subfamily: Agaristinae
- Genus: Arrothia; Jordan in Rothschild & Jordan, 1896

Genus of moths

Arrothia is a genus of moths of the family Noctuidae.

== Species ==
- Arrothia bicolor Rothschild, 1896
- Arrothia gueneianum Viette, 1954
