= Acanthoderes latevittata =

Scientific classification
- Kingdom: Animalia
- Phylum: Arthropoda
- Class: Insecta
- Order: Coleoptera
- Suborder: Polyphaga
- Infraorder: Cucujiformia
- Family: Cerambycidae
- Genus: Acanthoderes
- Species: A. latevittata

Binomial name
- Acanthoderes latevittata Aurivillius, 1921

Synonyms
- Acanthoderes onca Galileo & Martins, 2006; Psapharochrus latevittatus Wappes et al., 2006

Species of beetle

Acanthoderes latevittata is a species of beetle in the family Cerambycidae. It was described by Per Olof Christopher Aurivillius in 1921.
