= Alloesia =

Scientific classification
- Domain: Eukaryota
- Kingdom: Animalia
- Phylum: Arthropoda
- Class: Insecta
- Order: Coleoptera
- Suborder: Polyphaga
- Infraorder: Cucujiformia
- Family: Cerambycidae
- Genus: Alloesia

Genus of beetles

Alloesia is a genus of beetles in the family Cerambycidae, containing the following species:

- Alloesia bicolor Waterhouse, 1880
- Alloesia bivittata Chevrolat, 1862
- Alloesia chlorophana Chevrolat, 1862
- Alloesia vittata (Fabricius, 1801)
