= Amphelictus milleri =

Scientific classification
- Kingdom: Animalia
- Phylum: Arthropoda
- Class: Insecta
- Order: Coleoptera
- Suborder: Polyphaga
- Infraorder: Cucujiformia
- Family: Cerambycidae
- Subfamily: Cerambycinae
- Tribe: Cerambycini
- Genus: Amphelictus
- Species: A. milleri

Binomial name
- Amphelictus milleri Chemsak & Linsley, 1964

Species of beetle

Amphelictus milleri is a species in the longhorn beetle family Cerambycidae. It is found in Colombia.
