= Amphelictus scabrosus =

Scientific classification
- Kingdom: Animalia
- Phylum: Arthropoda
- Class: Insecta
- Order: Coleoptera
- Suborder: Polyphaga
- Infraorder: Cucujiformia
- Family: Cerambycidae
- Subfamily: Cerambycinae
- Tribe: Cerambycini
- Genus: Amphelictus
- Species: A. scabrosus

Binomial name
- Amphelictus scabrosus Eya & Chemsak, 2003

Species of beetle

Amphelictus scabrosus is a species in the longhorn beetle family Cerambycidae. It is found in Bolivia, Colombia, Costa Rica, Ecuador, and Panama.
