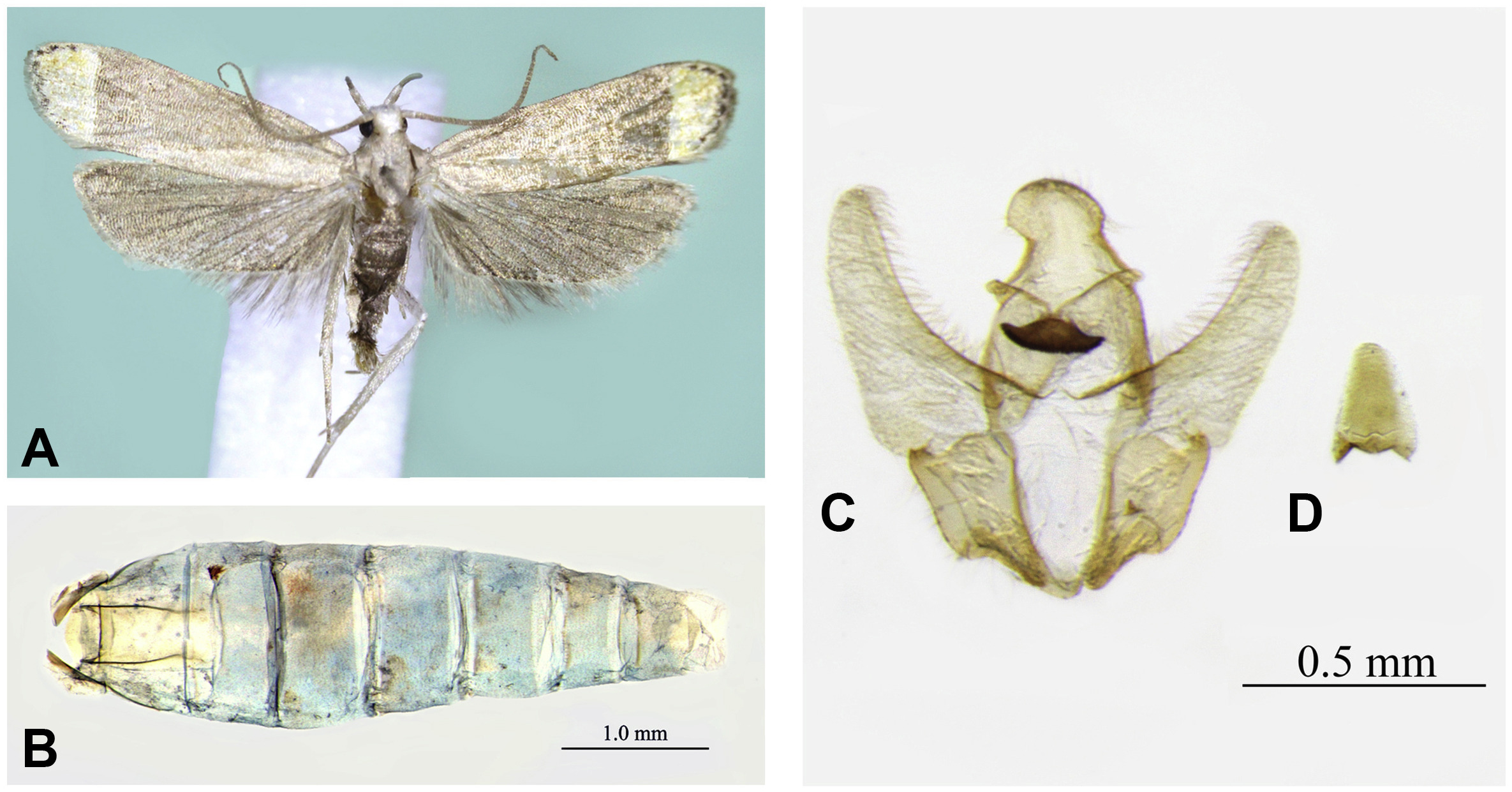
- Aulidiotis phoxopterella

Scientific classification
- Kingdom: Animalia
- Phylum: Arthropoda
- Class: Insecta
- Order: Lepidoptera
- Family: Gelechiidae
- Subfamily: Gelechiinae
- Genus: Aulidiotis; Meyrick, 1925

= Aulidiotis =

Genus of moths

Aulidiotis is a genus of moths in the family Gelechiidae.

== Species ==
- Aulidiotis bicolor Moriuti, 1977
- Aulidiotis biloba Liu & Li, 2016
- Aulidiotis phoxopterella Snellen, 1903
- Aulidiotis recta Liu & Li, 2016
- Aulidiotis trimaculata Liu & Li, 2016
