= Agaone peruviensis =

Scientific classification
- Domain: Eukaryota
- Kingdom: Animalia
- Phylum: Arthropoda
- Class: Insecta
- Order: Coleoptera
- Suborder: Polyphaga
- Infraorder: Cucujiformia
- Family: Cerambycidae
- Genus: Agaone
- Species: A. peruviensis

Binomial name
- Agaone peruviensis (Fisher, 1952)

Species of beetle

Agaone peruviensis is a species of beetle in the family Cerambycidae. It was described by Fisher in 1952.
