= Amphelictus aibussu =

Scientific classification
- Kingdom: Animalia
- Phylum: Arthropoda
- Class: Insecta
- Order: Coleoptera
- Suborder: Polyphaga
- Infraorder: Cucujiformia
- Family: Cerambycidae
- Genus: Amphelictus
- Species: A. aibussu

Binomial name
- Amphelictus aibussu Martins & Monne, 2005

Species of beetle

Amphelictus aibussu is a species of beetle in the family Cerambycidae.

== Description ==
Amphelictus aibussu has a reddish brown exoskeleton with the head and thorax being a slightly darker color like all long-horned beetles, Amphelictus aibussu has long, distinguishable, and segmented antennae. Amphelictus aibussu can be found at around 1 1/2 inches in length similarly to many other species in its genus.
