= Acer wilsonii =

Scientific classification
- Kingdom: Plantae
- Clade: Embryophytes
- Clade: Tracheophytes
- Clade: Spermatophytes
- Clade: Angiosperms
- Clade: Eudicots
- Clade: Rosids
- Order: Sapindales
- Family: Sapindaceae
- Genus: Acer
- Section: Acer sect. Palmata
- Series: Acer ser. Palmata
- Species: A. wilsonii

Binomial name
- Acer wilsonii Rehder

Synonyms
- List: Acer angustilobum Hu; Acer campbellii subsp. wilsonii (Rehder) P.C.de Jong; Acer lanpingense W.P.Fang & M.Y.Fang; Acer sichourense (W.P.Fang & M.Y.Fang) W.P.Fang; Acer taipuense W.P.Fang; Acer tutcheri subsp. angustilobum A.E.Murray; Acer wilsonii var. obtusum W.P.Fang & Y.T.Wu

Species of flowering plant

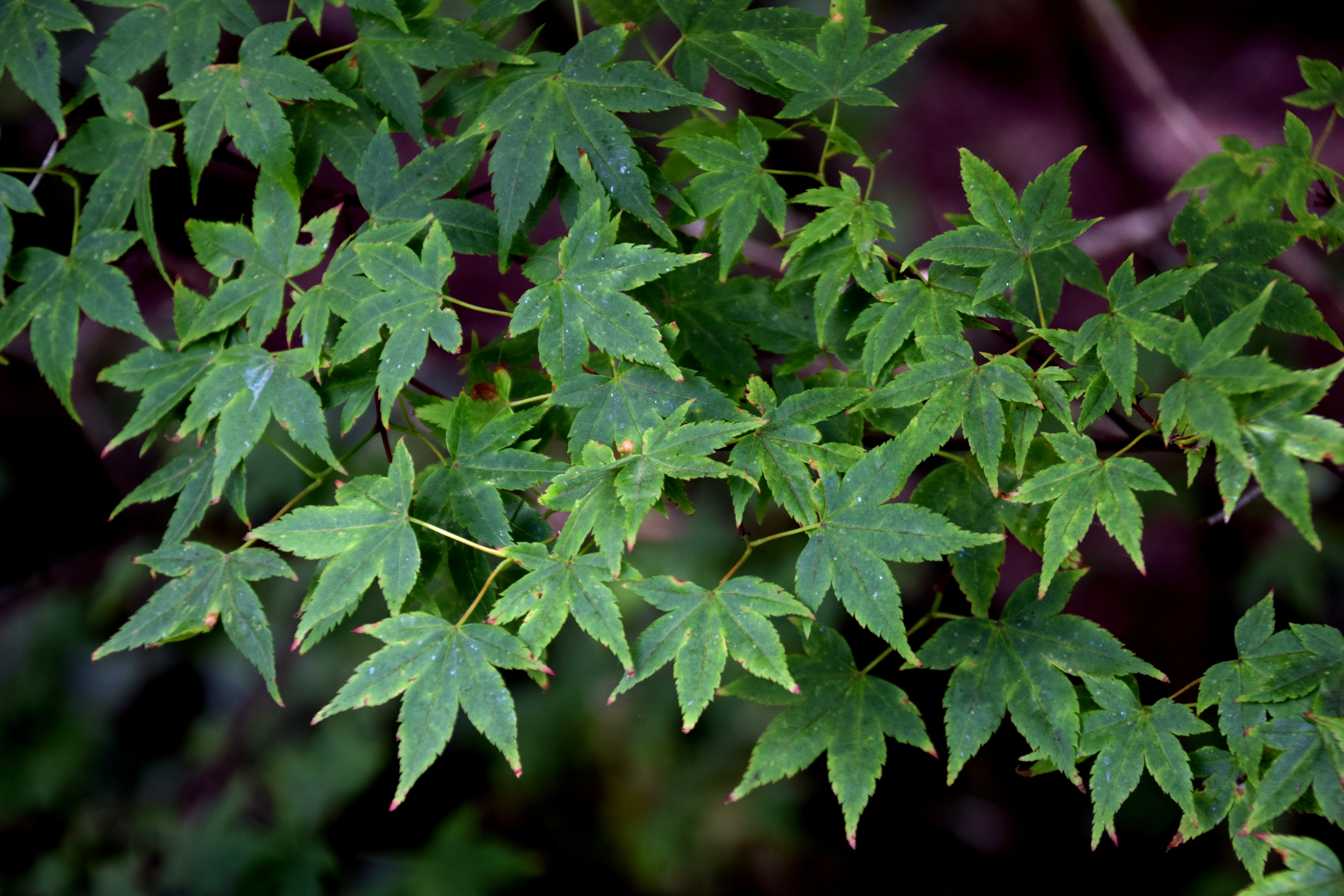
Acer campbellii ssp. wilsonii in Christchurch Botanic Gardens in Christchurch, Canterbury Region, New Zealand.

Acer wilsonii (in Chinese: 三峡枫, meaning "Three Gorges maple") is a species of flowering plant in the genus Acer, native to southeast and south-central China. It is considered by some authorities to be a subspecies of Campbell's maple, Acer campbellii subsp. wilsonii, but this is incorrect; it is in its own species complex. A tree typically 10 to 15 m (33 to 49 ft) tall, it prefers to grow in forests 900 to 2,000 m (3,000 to 6,600 ft) above sea level.
