= Abanycha pectoralis =

Scientific classification
- Domain: Eukaryota
- Kingdom: Animalia
- Phylum: Arthropoda
- Class: Insecta
- Order: Coleoptera
- Suborder: Polyphaga
- Infraorder: Cucujiformia
- Family: Cerambycidae
- Tribe: Hemilophini
- Genus: Abanycha
- Species: A. pectoralis

Binomial name
- Abanycha pectoralis Martins & Galileo, 2004

Species of beetle

Abanycha pectoralis is a species of beetle in the family Cerambycidae. It was described by Martins and Galileo in 2004. It is known from Costa Rica.
