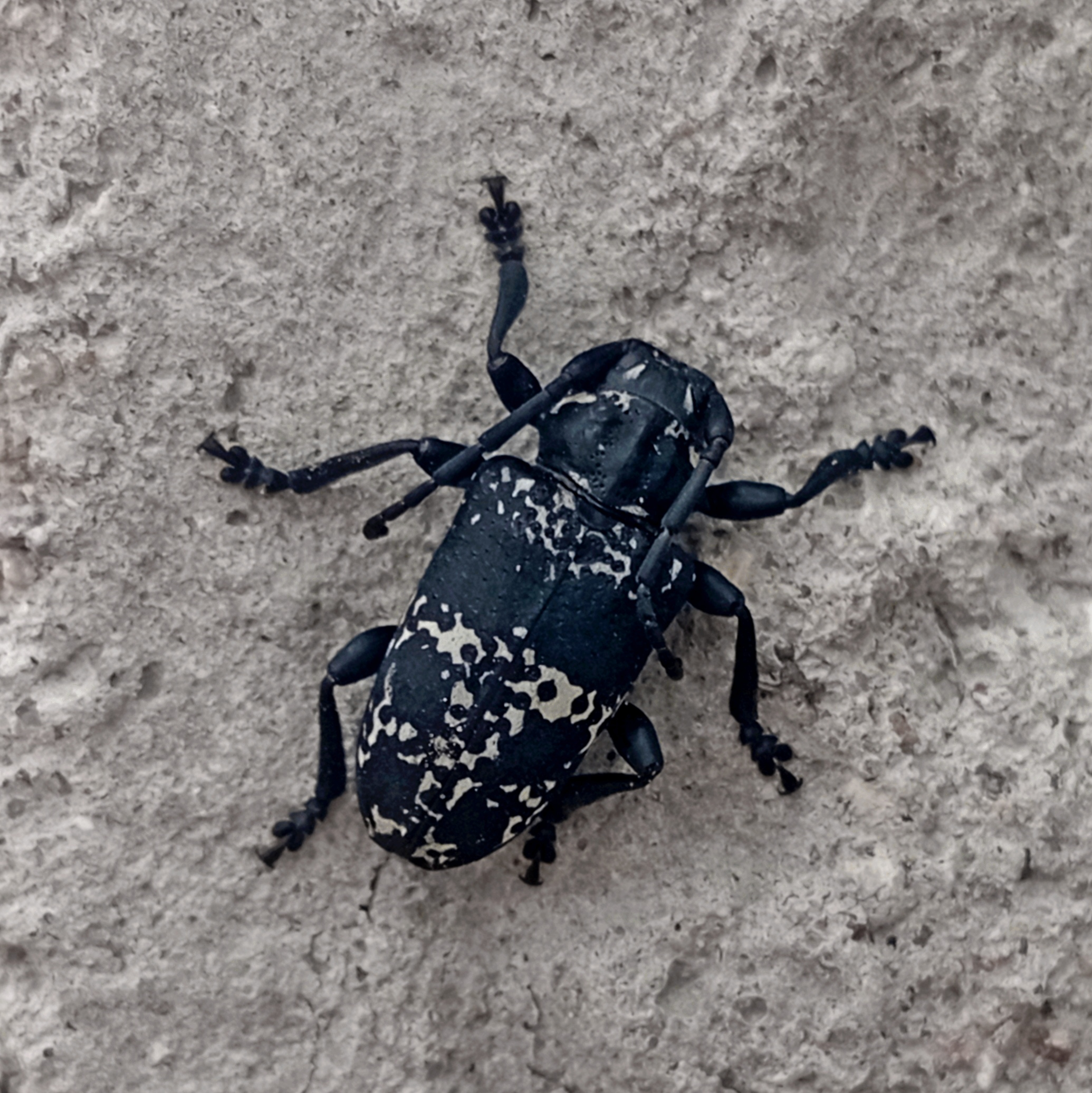

Scientific classification
- Kingdom: Animalia
- Phylum: Arthropoda
- Class: Insecta
- Order: Coleoptera
- Suborder: Polyphaga
- Infraorder: Cucujiformia
- Family: Cerambycidae
- Genus: Acanthoderes
- Species: A. funeraria

Binomial name
- Acanthoderes funeraria Bates, 1861

= Acanthoderes funeraria =

Species of beetle

Acanthoderes funeraria is a species of beetle in the family Cerambycidae. It was described by Henry Walter Bates in 1861.
