= Amphelictus =

Scientific classification
- Kingdom: Animalia
- Phylum: Arthropoda
- Class: Insecta
- Order: Coleoptera
- Suborder: Polyphaga
- Infraorder: Cucujiformia
- Family: Cerambycidae
- Tribe: Cerambycini
- Genus: Amphelictus

Genus of beetles

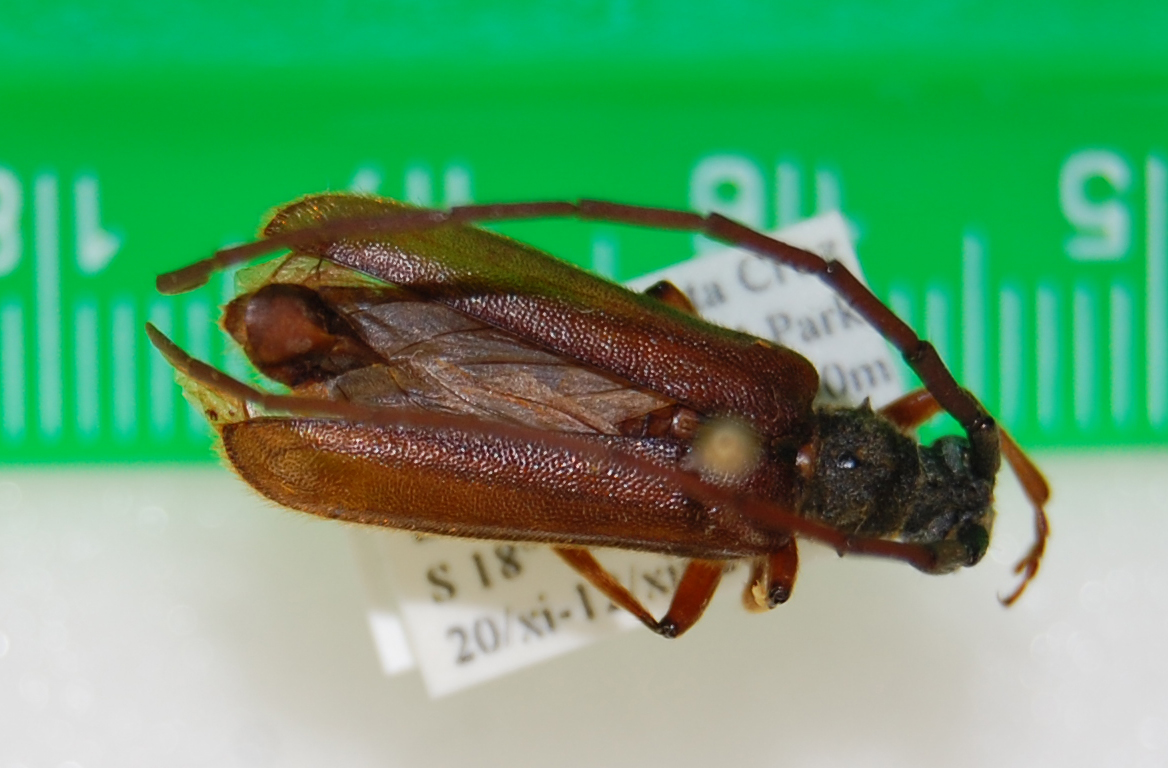
Amphelictus castaneus

Amphelictus is a genus of beetles in the family Cerambycidae, containing the following species:

- Amphelictus aibussu Martins & Monne, 2005
- Amphelictus aielloae Eya & Chemsak, 2003
- Amphelictus astales Martins & Monne, 2005
- Amphelictus bicolor Chemsak & Linsley, 1964
- Amphelictus brevidens Chemsak & Linsley, 1964
- Amphelictus caliginosus Martins & Monne, 2005
- Amphelictus castaneus Chemsak & Linsley, 1964
- Amphelictus cribripennis Chemsak Linsley, 1964
- Amphelictus curoei Eya & Chemsak, 2003
- Amphelictus fortunenesis Eya & Chemsak, 2003
- Amphelictus fuscipennis Eya & Chemsak, 2003
- Amphelictus gilloglyi Eya & Chemsak, 2003
- Amphelictus hispidus Martins & Monne, 2005
- Amphelictus hovorei Eya & Chemsak, 2003
- Amphelictus melas Bates, 1884
- Amphelictus milleri Chemsak & Linsley, 1964
- Amphelictus panamensis Chemsak & Linsley, 1964
- Amphelictus parvipunctus Eya & Chemsak, 2003
- Amphelictus potiaiuba Martins & Monne, 2005
- Amphelictus rugiscapus Fuchs, 1976
- Amphelictus scabrosus Eya & Chemsak, 2003
- Amphelictus secus Martins & Monne, 2005
