= Abanycha bicoloricornis =

Scientific classification
- Domain: Eukaryota
- Kingdom: Animalia
- Phylum: Arthropoda
- Class: Insecta
- Order: Coleoptera
- Suborder: Polyphaga
- Infraorder: Cucujiformia
- Family: Cerambycidae
- Tribe: Hemilophini
- Genus: Abanycha
- Species: A. bicoloricornis

Binomial name
- Abanycha bicoloricornis Galileo & Martins, 2009

Species of beetle

Abanycha bicoloricornis is a species of beetle in the family Cerambycidae. It was described by Galileo and Martins in 2009. It is known from Ecuador.
