= Agaone amazonica =

Scientific classification
- Domain: Eukaryota
- Kingdom: Animalia
- Phylum: Arthropoda
- Class: Insecta
- Order: Coleoptera
- Suborder: Polyphaga
- Infraorder: Cucujiformia
- Family: Cerambycidae
- Genus: Agaone
- Species: A. amazonica

Binomial name
- Agaone amazonica Bezark, Santos-Silva & Martins, 2011

Species of beetle

Agaone amazonica is a species of beetle in the family Cerambycidae. It was described by Bezark, Santos-Silva and Martins in 2011.
