= Abanycha urocosmia =

Scientific classification
- Domain: Eukaryota
- Kingdom: Animalia
- Phylum: Arthropoda
- Class: Insecta
- Order: Coleoptera
- Suborder: Polyphaga
- Infraorder: Cucujiformia
- Family: Cerambycidae
- Tribe: Hemilophini
- Genus: Abanycha
- Species: A. urocosmia

Binomial name
- Abanycha urocosmia (Bates, 1881)

Synonyms
- Adesmus urocosmia Aurivillius, 1923; Amphionycha urocosmia Bates, 1881; Hemilophus urocosmius Lameere, 1883

Species of beetle

Abanycha urocosmia is a species of beetle in the family Cerambycidae. It was described by Henry Walter Bates in 1881. It is known from Colombia.
