= Agaone punctilla =

Scientific classification
- Domain: Eukaryota
- Kingdom: Animalia
- Phylum: Arthropoda
- Class: Insecta
- Order: Coleoptera
- Suborder: Polyphaga
- Infraorder: Cucujiformia
- Family: Cerambycidae
- Genus: Agaone
- Species: A. punctilla

Binomial name
- Agaone punctilla Martins & Santos-Silva, 2010

Species of beetle

Agaone punctilla is a species of beetle in the family Cerambycidae. It was described by Martins and Santos-Silva in 2010.
