= Acanthoderes laevicollis =

Scientific classification
- Kingdom: Animalia
- Phylum: Arthropoda
- Class: Insecta
- Order: Coleoptera
- Suborder: Polyphaga
- Infraorder: Cucujiformia
- Family: Cerambycidae
- Genus: Acanthoderes
- Species: A. laevicollis

Binomial name
- Acanthoderes laevicollis Bates, 1872

Species of beetle

Acanthoderes laevicollis is a species of beetle in the family Cerambycidae. It was described by Henry Walter Bates in 1872. They are native to Central America, especially Nicaragua.
