= Acanthoderes =

Scientific classification
- Domain: Eukaryota
- Kingdom: Animalia
- Phylum: Arthropoda
- Class: Insecta
- Order: Coleoptera
- Suborder: Polyphaga
- Infraorder: Cucujiformia
- Family: Cerambycidae
- Tribe: Acanthoderini
- Genus: Acanthoderes; Audinet-Serville, 1835

Genus of beetles

Acanthoderes is a genus of beetles in the family Cerambycidae, containing the following species:

- Acanthoderes albifrons Chemsak & Hovore, 2002
- Acanthoderes aliciae Chemsak & Hovore, 2002
- Acanthoderes alpina Chemsak & Hovore, 2002
- Acanthoderes amplifrons Chemsak & Hovore, 2002
- Acanthoderes amplitoris Chemsak & Hovore, 2002
- Acanthoderes ariasi Chemsak & Hovore, 2002
- Acanthoderes bicolor Chemsak & Hovore, 2002
- Acanthoderes cavei Chemsak & Hovore, 2002
- Acanthoderes daviesii (Swederus, 1787)
- Acanthoderes ferruginea Chemsak & Hovore, 2002
- Acanthoderes flavomaculata Chemsak & Hovore, 2002
- Acanthoderes funeraria Bates, 1861
- Acanthoderes giesberti Chemsak & Hovore, 2002
- Acanthoderes hondurae Chemsak & Hovore, 2002
- Acanthoderes laevicollis Bates, 1872
- Acanthoderes laportei Aurivillius, 1923
- Acanthoderes latevittata Aurivillius, 1921
- Acanthoderes latiforma Chemsak & Hovore, 2002
- Acanthoderes linsleyi Chemsak & Hovore, 2002
- Acanthoderes noguerai Chemsak & Hovore, 2002
- Acanthoderes paravetusta Chemsak & Hovore, 2002
- Acanthoderes parva Chemsak & Hovore, 2002
- Acanthoderes parvimacula Zajciw, 1964
- Acanthoderes quattuordecimguttata (Schoenherr, 1817)
- Acanthoderes rubripes Bates, 1872
- Acanthoderes rufofemorata Aurivillius, 1926
- Acanthoderes satanas Bates, 1880
- Acanthoderes septemmaculata Buquet, 1859
- Acanthoderes solisi Chemsak & Hovore, 2002
- Acanthoderes subtessellata Bates, 1880
- Acanthoderes thammi Bates, 1880
- Acanthoderes zischkai Tippmann, 1960
- Acanthoderes zonata Bates, 1880
