= Amphelictus aielloae =

Scientific classification
- Kingdom: Animalia
- Phylum: Arthropoda
- Class: Insecta
- Order: Coleoptera
- Suborder: Polyphaga
- Infraorder: Cucujiformia
- Family: Cerambycidae
- Genus: Amphelictus
- Species: A. aielloae

Binomial name
- Amphelictus aielloae Eya & Chemsak, 2003

Species of beetle

Amphelictus aielloae is a species in the longhorn beetle family Cerambycidae. It is found in Panama.
