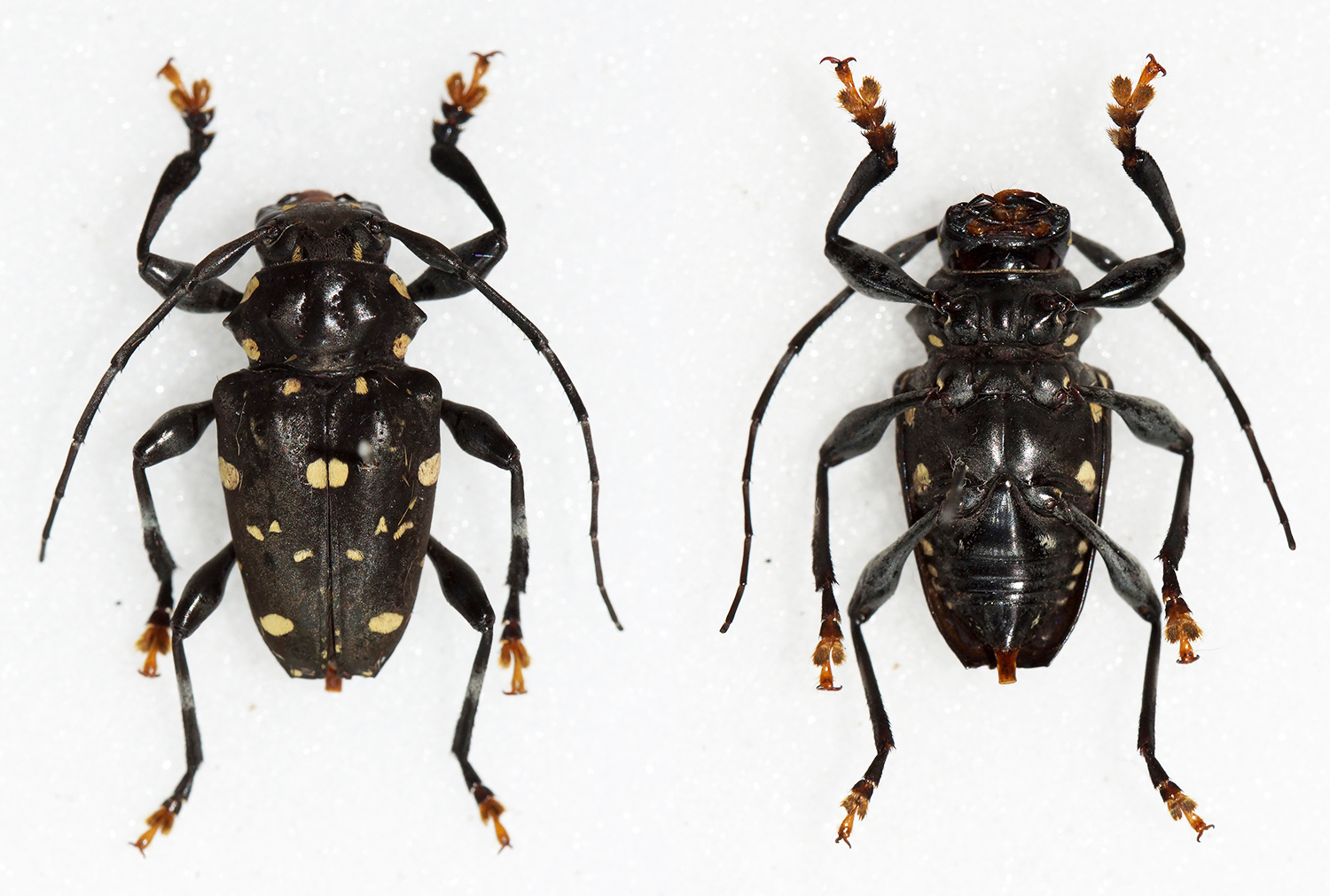

Scientific classification
- Kingdom: Animalia
- Phylum: Arthropoda
- Clade: Pancrustacea
- Class: Insecta
- Order: Coleoptera
- Suborder: Polyphaga
- Infraorder: Cucujiformia
- Family: Cerambycidae
- Genus: Acanthoderes
- Species: A. daviesii

Binomial name
- Acanthoderes daviesii (Swederus, 1787)

= Acanthoderes daviesii =

Species of beetle

Acanthoderes daviesii is a species of beetle in the family Cerambycidae. It was described by Swederus in 1787.
