= Amphelictus fortunenesis =

Scientific classification
- Kingdom: Animalia
- Phylum: Arthropoda
- Class: Insecta
- Order: Coleoptera
- Suborder: Polyphaga
- Infraorder: Cucujiformia
- Family: Cerambycidae
- Genus: Amphelictus
- Species: A. fortunenesis

Binomial name
- Amphelictus fortunenesis Eya & Chemsak, 2003

Species of beetle

Amphelictus fortunenesis is a species of beetle in the family Cerambycidae.
