= Antaeotricha bicolor =

Scientific classification
- Kingdom: Animalia
- Phylum: Arthropoda
- Clade: Pancrustacea
- Class: Insecta
- Order: Lepidoptera
- Family: Depressariidae
- Genus: Antaeotricha
- Species: A. bicolor

Binomial name
- Antaeotricha bicolor (Zeller, 1839)

Synonyms
- Stenoma bicolor Zeller, 1839; Stenoma dissimilis Kearfott, 1911; Antaeotricha annixa Meyrick, 1918

Species of moth in genus Antaeotricha

Antaeotricha bicolor is a species of moth of the family Depressariidae. It is found in Brazil (São Paulo).

The wingspan is about 21 mm for males and 26–27 mm for females. The forewings are ochreous-white, in males with an irregular transverse light brownish spot from the costa before one-fourth, with two black marks on its anterior edge in the disc, connected by a very oblique series of several light brownish marks with a triangular dark brown spot on the dorsum towards the tornus, within this line the dorsal area is slightly tinged brownish and the dorsal edge expanded with rough projecting scales, in females a very oblique fuscous fascia from the base of the costa, below the middle broadly dilated and extending on the dorsum from before the middle to near the tornus, suffusedly marbled dark purple-fuscous on the dorsal portion, the basal area within this slightly brownish-tinged. There is an indistinct whitish spot on the end of the cell, preceded and followed by portions of faint oblique irregular cloudy pale brownish lines in the disc and there is a curved subterminal line of fuscous dots on the lower three-fourths of the wing, as well as a faint pale brownish cloud before the apex. The hindwings are ochreous-whitish, in males with the costal area expanded from the base to beyond the middle and the edge clothed with long dense projecting whitish-fuscous hairscales, with an ochreous-whitish subcostal hairpencil from the base reaching the middle, and a streak of pale ochreous hairs running from the lower margin of the cell towards the base to the upper angle of the cell.
