= Asparus =

Scientific classification
- Kingdom: Animalia
- Phylum: Arthropoda
- Class: Insecta
- Order: Lepidoptera
- Superfamily: Noctuoidea
- Family: Erebidae
- Subfamily: Arctiinae
- Tribe: Lithosiini
- Genus: Asparus; Watson, 1980
- Species: A. bicolor

Binomial name
- Asparus bicolor (Walker, 1855)

Synonyms
- Sarapus Walker, 1855 (preocc.); Sarapus bicolor Walker, 1855

Genus of moths

Asparus is a genus of moths in the subfamily Arctiinae. It contains the single species Asparus bicolor, which is found in South Africa.
