= Abanycha bicolor =

Scientific classification
- Domain: Eukaryota
- Kingdom: Animalia
- Phylum: Arthropoda
- Class: Insecta
- Order: Coleoptera
- Suborder: Polyphaga
- Infraorder: Cucujiformia
- Family: Cerambycidae
- Tribe: Hemilophini
- Genus: Abanycha
- Species: A. bicolor

Binomial name
- Abanycha bicolor (Gahan, 1889)

Synonyms
- Adesmus bicolor Aurivillius, 1923; Amphionycha bicolor Gahan, 1889

Species of beetle

Abanycha bicolor is a species of beetle in the family Cerambycidae. It was described by Charles Joseph Gahan in 1889. It is known from Ecuador.
