= Phlogomera =

Scientific classification
- Kingdom: Animalia
- Phylum: Arthropoda
- Class: Insecta
- Order: Lepidoptera
- Superfamily: Noctuoidea
- Family: Erebidae
- Subfamily: Arctiinae
- Tribe: Lithosiini
- Genus: Phlogomera; Hampson, 1914
- Species: P. bicolor

Binomial name
- Phlogomera bicolor (Rothschild, 1913)

Synonyms
- Asura bicolor Rothschild, 1913

Genus of moths

Phlogomera is a monotypic moth genus in the family Erebidae erected by George Hampson in 1914. Its only species, Phlogomera bicolor, was first described by Walter Rothschild in 1913. It is found in New Guinea.
