= Amata bicolor =

Scientific classification
- Kingdom: Animalia
- Phylum: Arthropoda
- Class: Insecta
- Order: Lepidoptera
- Superfamily: Noctuoidea
- Family: Erebidae
- Subfamily: Arctiinae
- Genus: Amata
- Species: A. bicolor

Binomial name
- Amata bicolor (Walker, 1854)

Synonyms
- Euchromia bicolor Walker, 1854

Species of moth

Amata bicolor is a species of moth of the subfamily Arctiinae first described by Francis Walker in 1854. It is found in Queensland, Australia.

Adults are wasp like with black wings and transverse black and yellow bands on the body.
