= Acronicta bicolor =

Scientific classification
- Kingdom: Animalia
- Phylum: Arthropoda
- Clade: Pancrustacea
- Class: Insecta
- Order: Lepidoptera
- Superfamily: Noctuoidea
- Family: Noctuidae
- Genus: Acronicta
- Species: A. bicolor

Binomial name
- Acronicta bicolor Moore, 1881

Synonyms
- Acronycta bicolor Moore, 1881; Pseudepunda bicolor (Moore, 1881)

Species of moth

Acronicta bicolor is a moth of the family Noctuidae. It is found in the Punjab region.
