= Apantesis bicolor =

Scientific classification
- Kingdom: Animalia
- Phylum: Arthropoda
- Class: Insecta
- Order: Lepidoptera
- Superfamily: Noctuoidea
- Family: Erebidae
- Subfamily: Arctiinae
- Genus: Apantesis
- Species: A. bicolor

Binomial name
- Apantesis bicolor Hampson, 1904

Species of moth

Apantesis bicolor is a moth of the family Erebidae. It was described by George Hampson in 1904. It is found on the Bahamas.
