= Amphelictus bicolor =

Scientific classification
- Kingdom: Animalia
- Phylum: Arthropoda
- Class: Insecta
- Order: Coleoptera
- Suborder: Polyphaga
- Infraorder: Cucujiformia
- Family: Cerambycidae
- Subfamily: Cerambycinae
- Tribe: Cerambycini
- Genus: Amphelictus
- Species: A. bicolor

Binomial name
- Amphelictus bicolor Chemsak & Linsley, 1964

Species of beetle

Amphelictus bicolor is a species in the longhorn beetle family Cerambycidae. It is found in Panama, Costa Rica, and Mexico.
