= Aulidiotis bicolor =

Scientific classification
- Kingdom: Animalia
- Phylum: Arthropoda
- Class: Insecta
- Order: Lepidoptera
- Family: Gelechiidae
- Genus: Aulidiotis
- Species: A. bicolor

Binomial name
- Aulidiotis bicolor Moriuti, 1977

Species of moth

Aulidiotis bicolor is a species of moth in the family Gelechiidae. It was described by Sigeru Moriuti in 1977. It is found in Japan, where it has been recorded from Yakushima island.
