= Aspergillus bicolor =

Scientific classification
- Kingdom: Fungi
- Division: Ascomycota
- Class: Eurotiomycetes
- Order: Eurotiales
- Family: Aspergillaceae
- Genus: Aspergillus
- Species: A. bicolor

Binomial name
- Aspergillus bicolor M. Christensen & States (1978)

Species of fungus

Aspergillus bicolor is a species of fungus in the genus Aspergillus. It is from the Aenei section. The species was first described in 1978. It has been reported to produce sterigmatocystin, versicolorins, and some anthraquinones.

== Growth on agar plates ==
Apsergillus bicolor has been cultivated on both Czapek yeast extract agar (CYA) plates and Malt Extract Agar Oxoid® (MEAOX) plates. The growth morphology of the colonies can be seen in the pictures below.

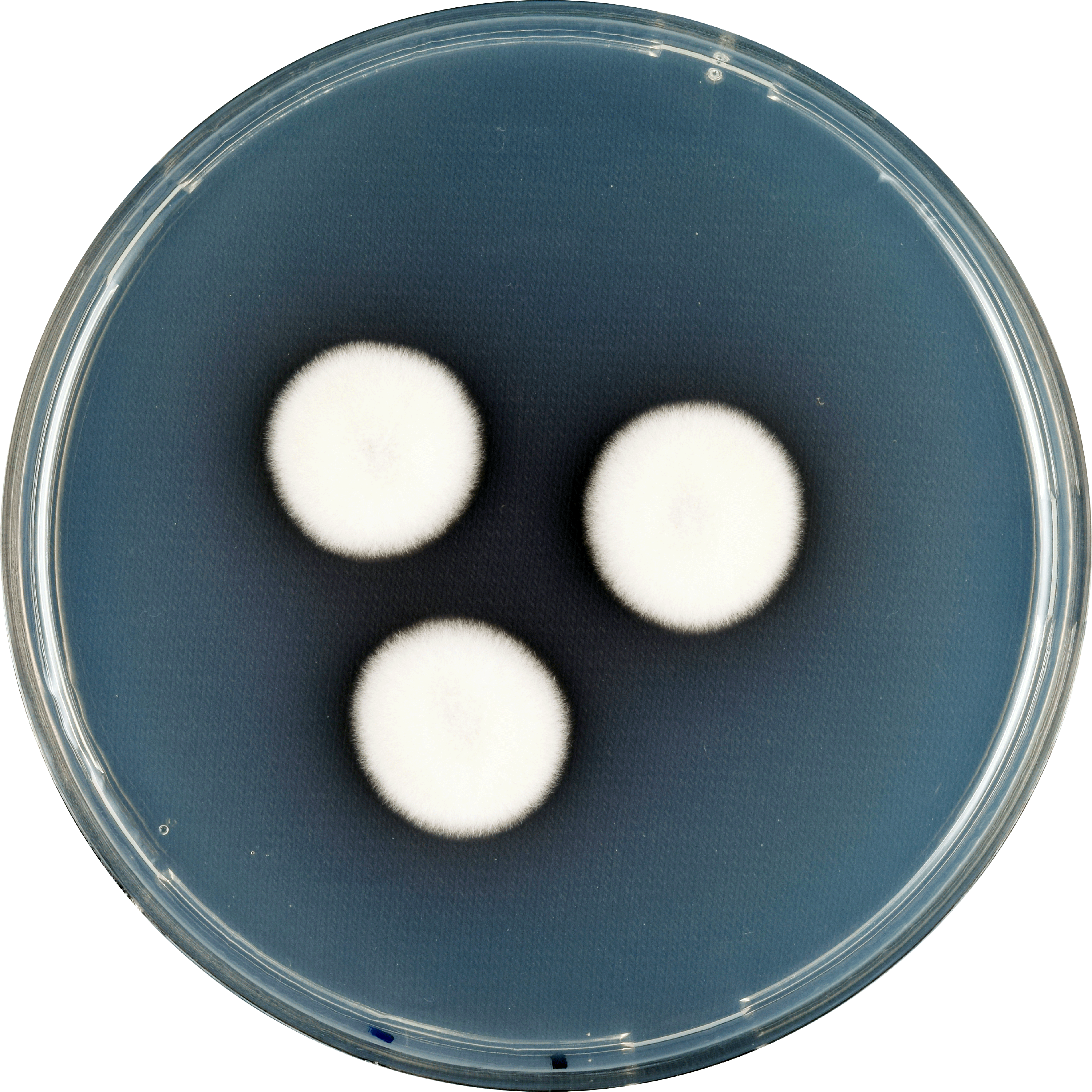
Aspergillus bicolor growing on CYA media

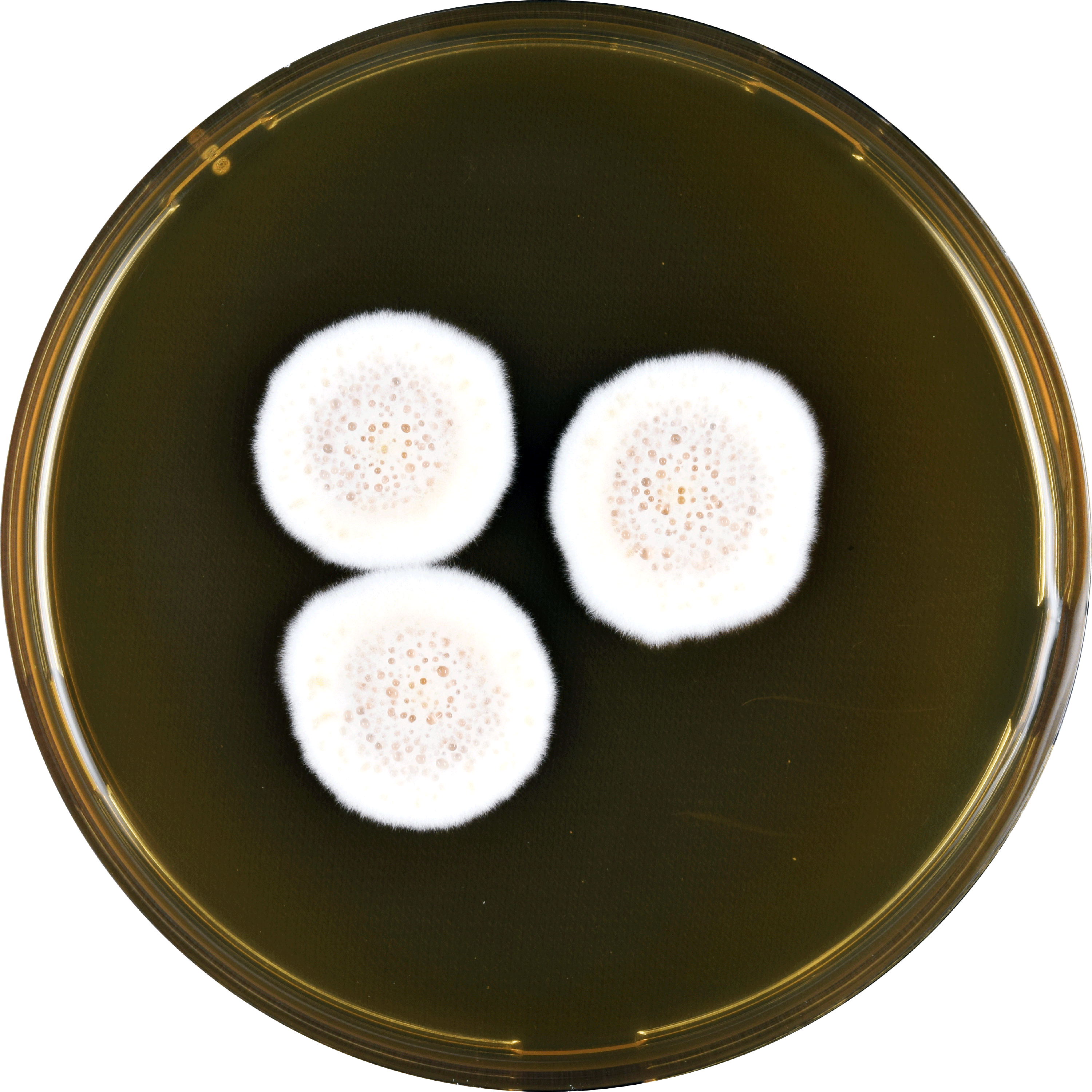
Aspergillus bicolor growing on MEAOX media
