= Arrothia bicolor =

Scientific classification
- Kingdom: Animalia
- Phylum: Arthropoda
- Class: Insecta
- Order: Lepidoptera
- Superfamily: Noctuoidea
- Family: Noctuidae
- Genus: Arrothia
- Species: A. bicolor

Binomial name
- Arrothia bicolor Rothschild, 1896

Synonyms
- Arrothia melanobasis Jordan, 1926

Species of moth

Arrothia bicolor is a moth of the family Noctuidae. This moth is native to western Madagascar.

The female of this species has a wingspan of 20 mm (0.79 in). The basal half of the forewings is buffish yellow shaded with black scales and the other half is black. The hindwings are similar but the yellow half is less shattered with black scales. The antennae, palpi, and head are black.
