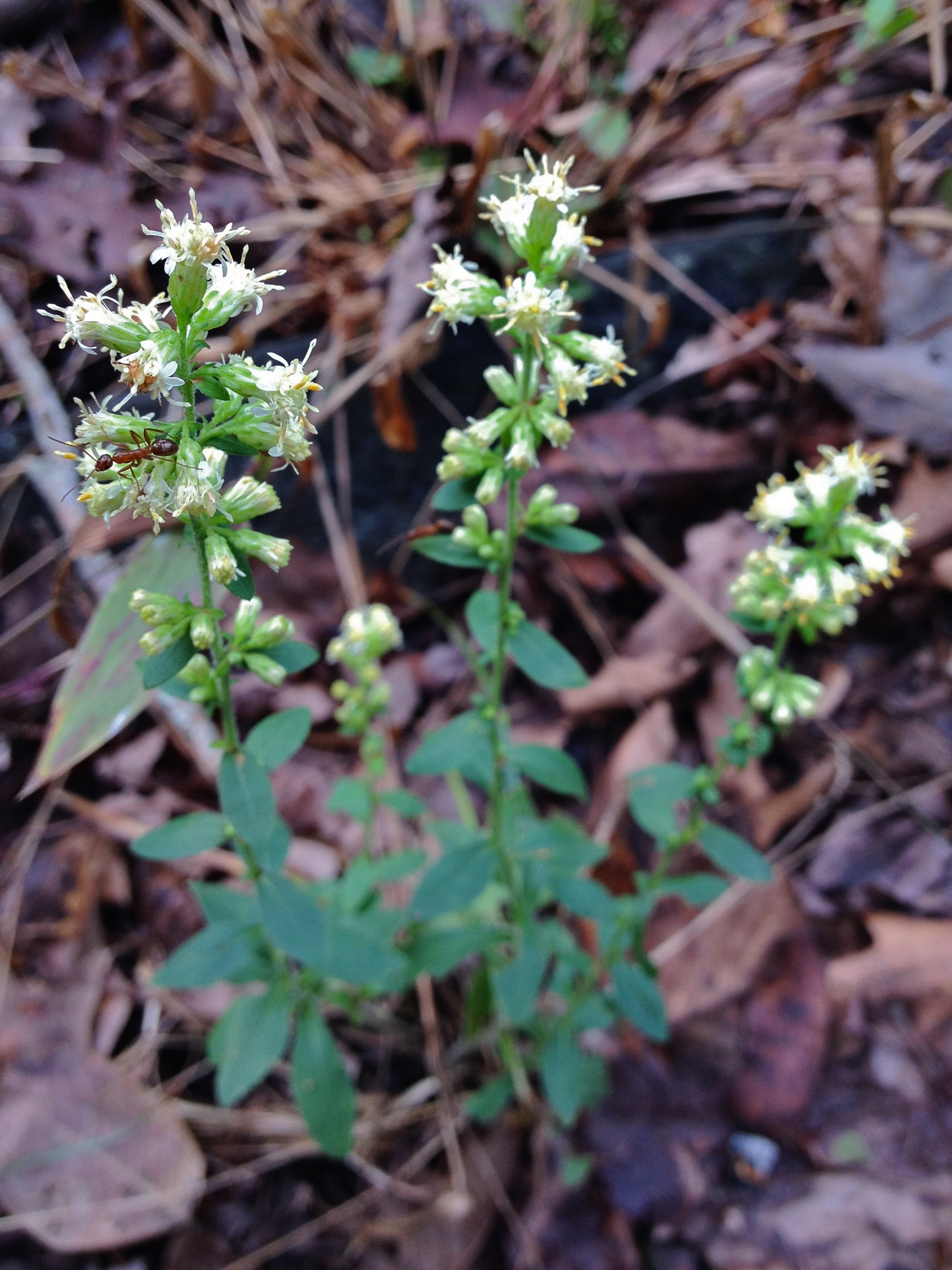

Scientific classification
- Kingdom: Plantae
- Clade: Tracheophytes
- Clade: Angiosperms
- Clade: Eudicots
- Clade: Asterids
- Order: Asterales
- Family: Asteraceae
- Genus: Solidago
- Species: S. bicolor

Binomial name
- Solidago bicolor L.

Synonyms
- Synonymy: Aster bicolor (L.) Nees; Aster pubens (M.A. Curtis ex Torr. & A. Gray) Kuntze; Solidago alba Mill.; Solidago bicolor var. concolor Torr. & A.Gray; Solidago curtisii var. pubens (M.A. Curtis ex Torr. & A. Gray) A. Gray; Solidago bicolor var. hispida (Muhl. ex Willd.) Britton, Sterns & Poggenb.; Solidago bicolor var. lanata (Hook.) A.Gray; Solidago bicolor var. luteola Farw.; Solidago bicolor var. ovalis Farw.; Solidago bicolor var. spathulata Farw.; Solidago bicolor var. tonsa; Solidago curtisii var. pubens (M.A.Curtis ex Torr. & A.Gray) A.Gray; Solidago pubens M.A. Curtis ex Torr. & A. Gray

= Solidago bicolor =

Species of flowering plant

Solidago bicolor, with several common names including white goldenrod and silverrod, is a plant species native to much of eastern North America. It is found in Canada (from Manitoba to Nova Scotia) and in the United States (every state completely east of the Mississippi except Florida). It prefers sandy and rocky soils, and can frequently be found along roadsides.

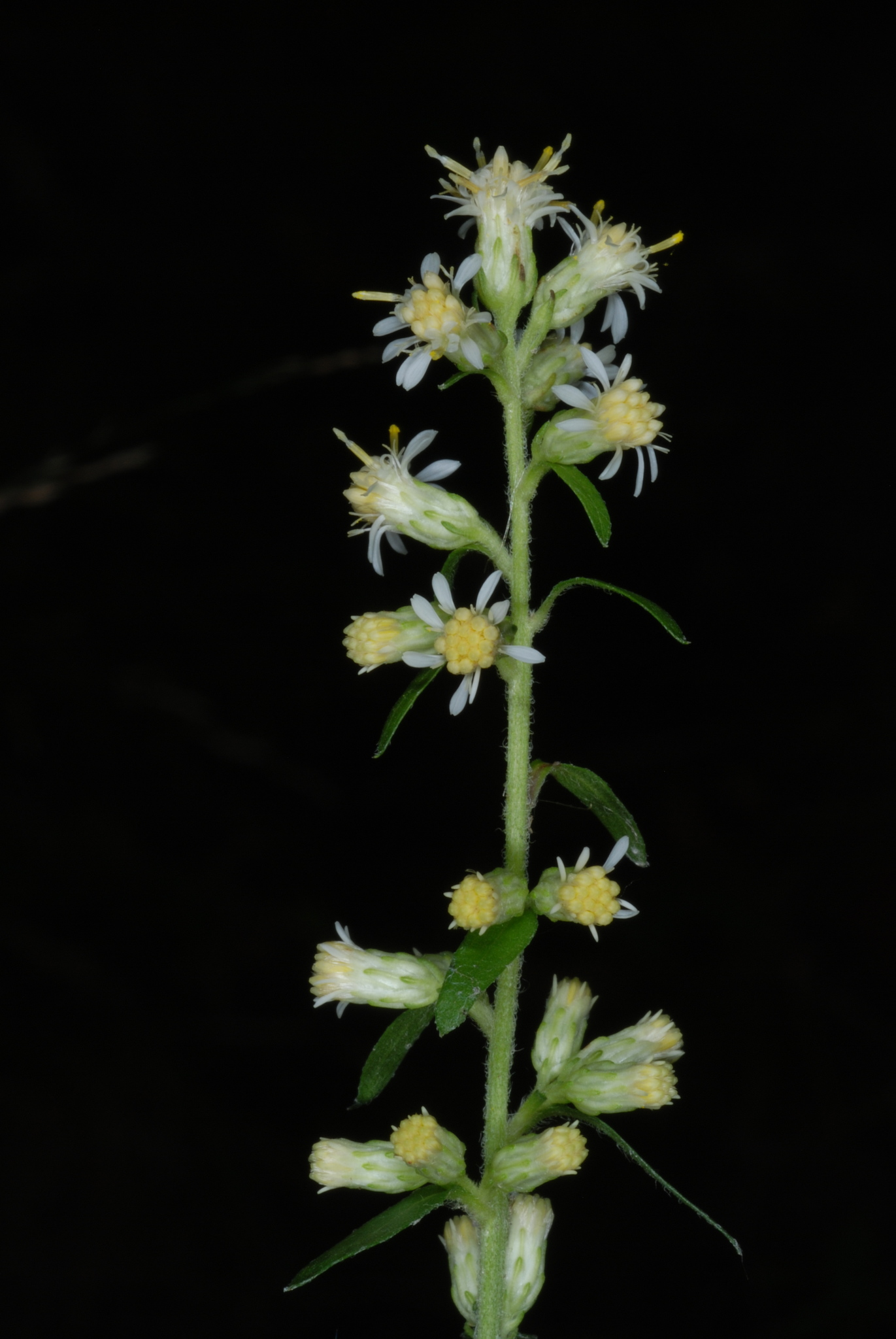
Solidago bicolor

Solidago bicolor is distinctive in the genus. Stems are thin and wiry. Flowers are white rather than yellow, the heads mostly clustered in the axils of the leaves rather than displayed in a large terminal raceme.

== Galls ==
This species is host to the following insect-induced gall:

- Rhopalomyia guttata Dorchin

external link to gallformers
