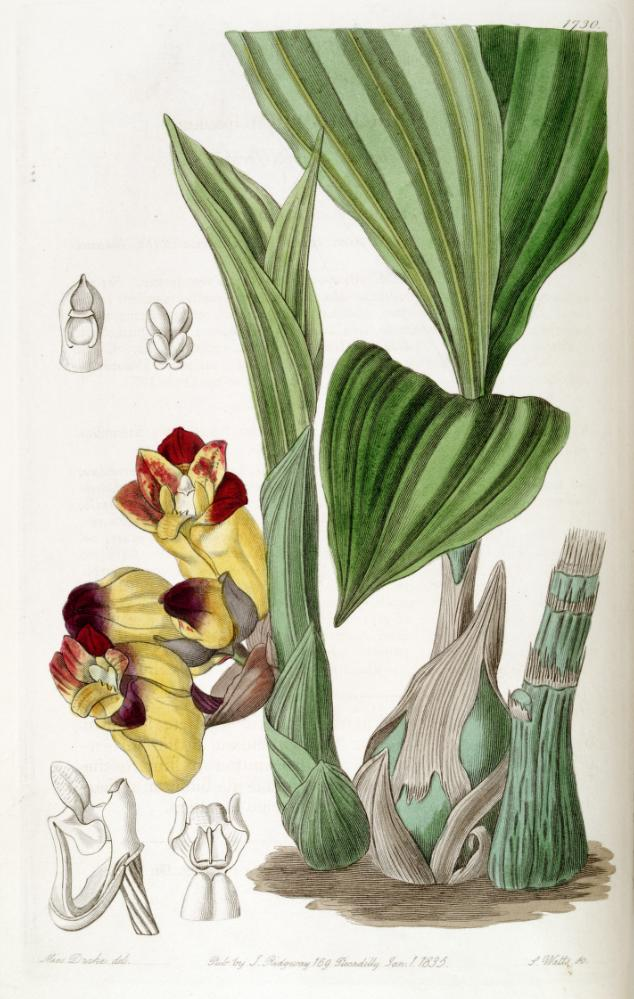

Scientific classification
- Kingdom: Plantae
- Clade: Tracheophytes
- Clade: Angiosperms
- Clade: Monocots
- Order: Asparagales
- Family: Orchidaceae
- Subfamily: Epidendroideae
- Genus: Acanthophippium
- Species: A. bicolor

Binomial name
- Acanthophippium bicolor Lindl. (1835)

= Acanthophippium bicolor =

Species of orchid

Acanthophippium bicolor is a species of orchid that is native to southeast India and Sri Lanka.
