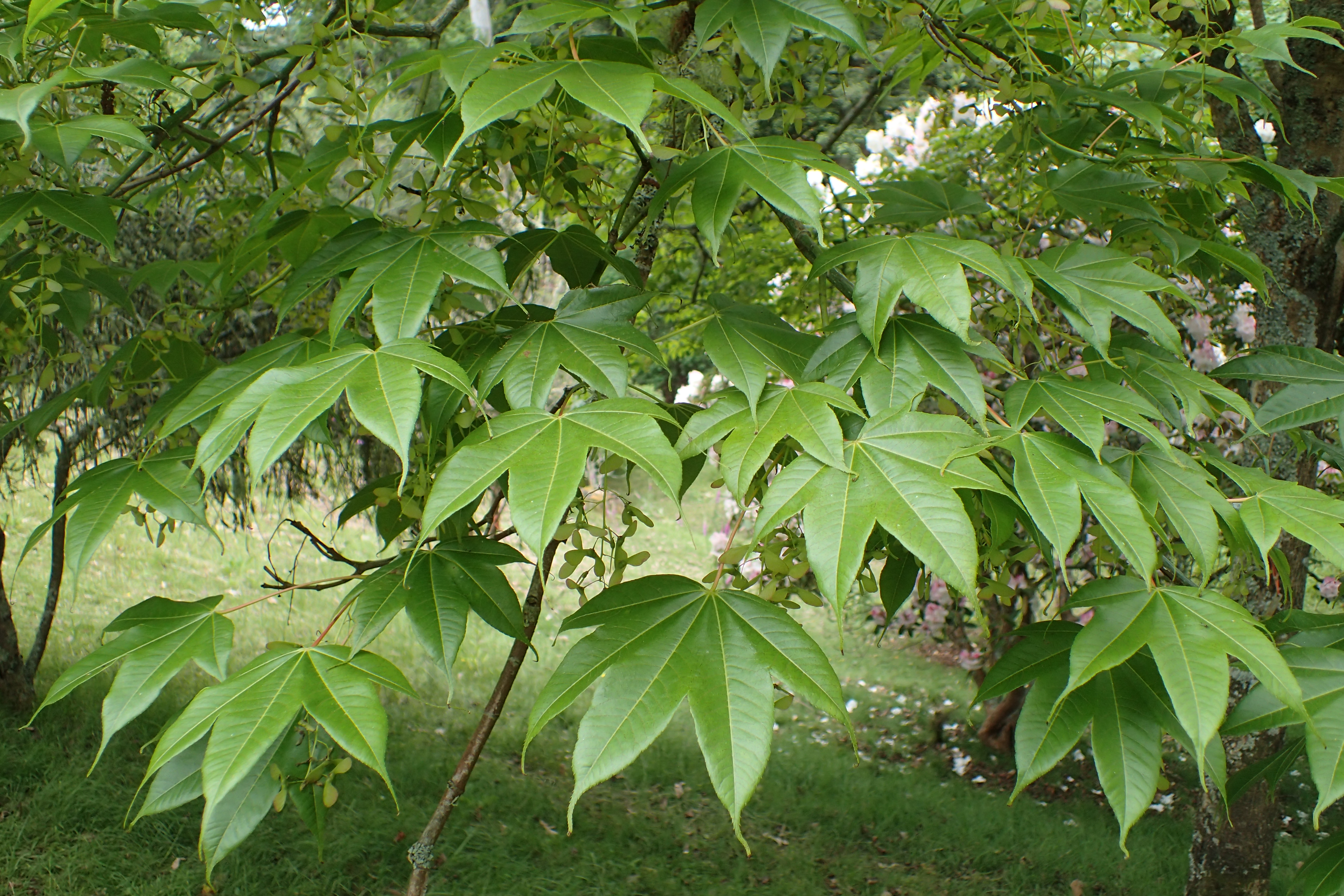
- In Hackfalls Arboretum

Conservation status
- Least Concern (IUCN 3.1)

Scientific classification
- Kingdom: Plantae
- Clade: Tracheophytes
- Clade: Angiosperms
- Clade: Eudicots
- Clade: Rosids
- Order: Sapindales
- Family: Sapindaceae
- Genus: Acer
- Section: Acer sect. Palmata
- Series: Acer ser. Palmata
- Species: A. campbellii

Binomial name
- Acer campbellii Hook.f. & Thomson ex Hiern

Subspecies
- Acer campbellii subsp. campbellii; Acer campbellii subsp. flabellatum (Rehder) A.E.Murray

= Acer campbellii =

Species of plant

Acer campbellii, commonly known as Campbell's maple or Himalayan maple, is a species of maple tree indigenous to mixed forests at elevations of 1,800–3,700 metres (6,000–12,000 ft) in Bhutan, northern India, Laos, Myanmar, Nepal, and Vietnam, as well as southern Sichuan, southern Tibet, and northwest Yunnan in China. It may grow up to 15 m (49 ft) in height. The deciduous leaves are 8–15 cm (3.1–5.9 in) by 9–22 cm (3.5–8.7 in) in size.

== Subspecies ==
Two subspecies are accepted.

- Acer campbellii subsp. campbellii (synonyms A. campbellii var. fantsipanense L.F.Gagnep. and A. campbellii var. serratifolium Banerji) – Himalayas to China (northwestern Yunnan) and northern Indochina (Laos, Myanmar, and Vietnam)
- Acer campbellii subsp. flabellatum (Rehder) A.E.Murray (synonyms A. campbellii subsp. heptaphlebium (Gagnep.) A.E.Murray, A. campbellii var. yunnanense Rehder, A. flabellatum Rehder, A. heptalobum Diels, A. heptaphlebium Gagnep., and A. taiwanense Yamam.) – southern China and northern Indochina (Laos, Myanmar, and Vietnam)
