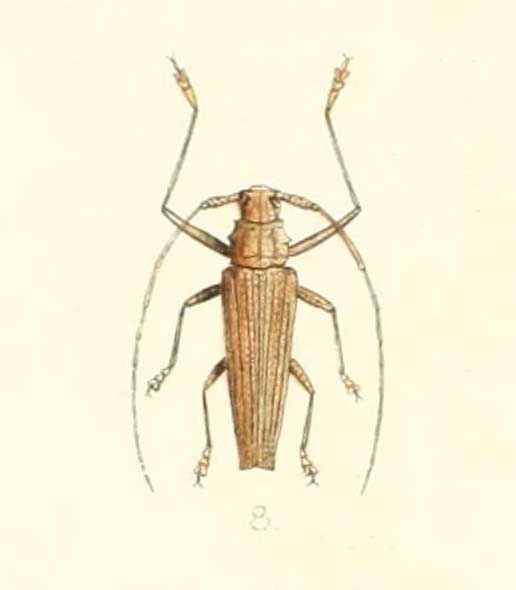
- Homonoea uniformis

Scientific classification
- Domain: Eukaryota
- Kingdom: Animalia
- Phylum: Arthropoda
- Class: Insecta
- Order: Coleoptera
- Suborder: Polyphaga
- Infraorder: Cucujiformia
- Family: Cerambycidae
- Subfamily: Lamiinae
- Tribe: Homonoeini; Thomson, 1864

Genera
- See text.

= Homonoeini =

Tribe of beetles

Homonoeini is a tribe of longhorn beetles of the subfamily Lamiinae. It was described by James Thomson in 1864.

== Taxonomy ==
- Anapausa Thomson, 1864
- Anapausoides Breuning, 1973
- Bumetopia Pascoe, 1858
- Caroliniella Blair, 1940
- Catapausa Aurivillius, 1908
- Filipinmulciber Vives, 2009
- Grynex Pascoe, 1888
- Heteroclytomorpha Blanchard, 1853
- Homonoea Newman, 1842
- Inermomulciber Breuning, 1974
- Metamulciber Breuning, 1940
- Metopivaria McKeown, 1952
- Mulciber Thomson, 1864
- Notomulciber Blackburn, 1894
- Paragrynex Breuning, 1940
- Paramulciber Breuning, 1939
- Pseudomulciber Breuning, 1961
- Sormea Lacordaire, 1872
- Trachelophora Perroud, 1855
