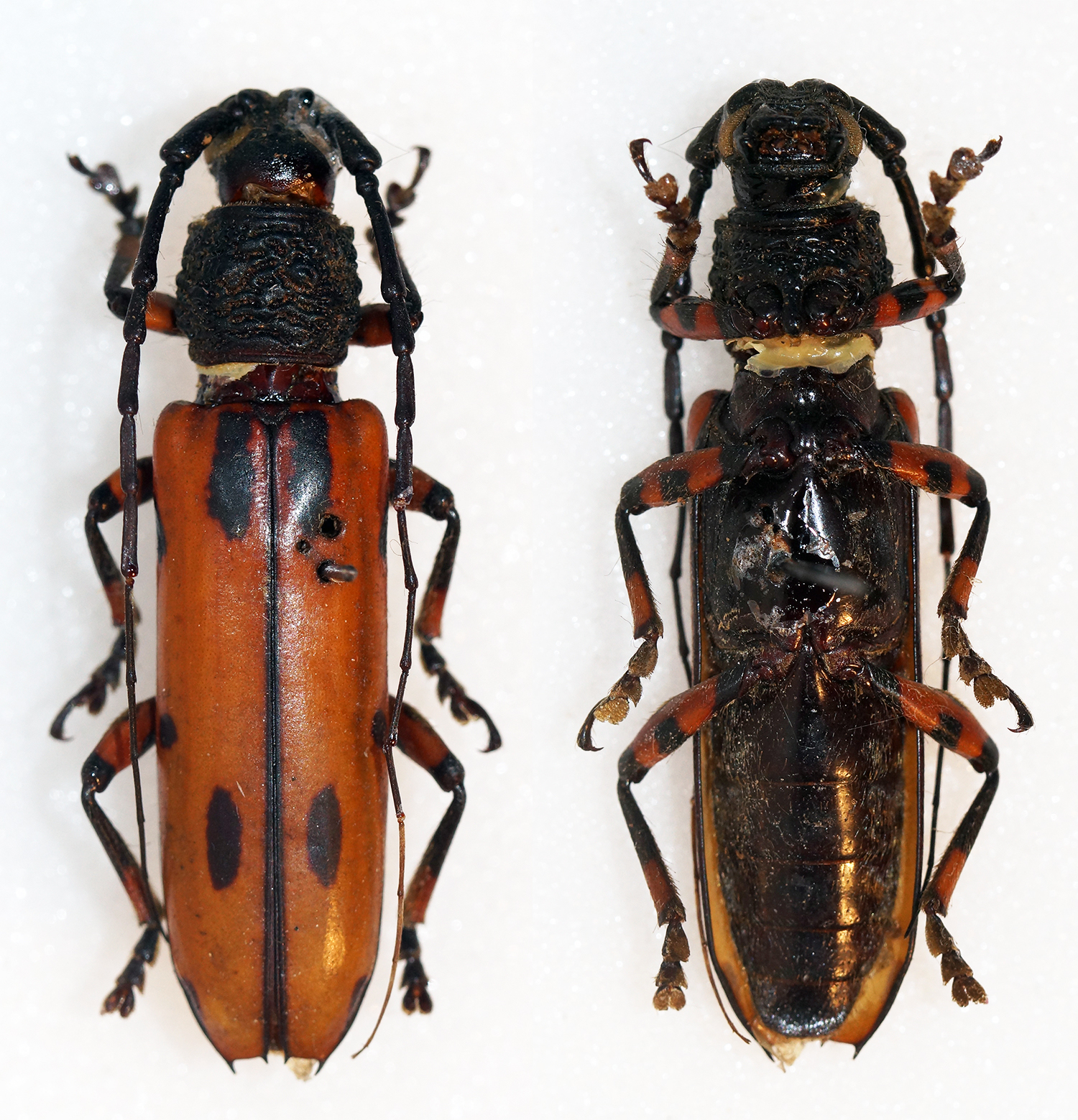
- Xestiodion pictipes

Scientific classification
- Kingdom: Animalia
- Phylum: Arthropoda
- Class: Insecta
- Order: Coleoptera
- Suborder: Polyphaga
- Infraorder: Cucujiformia
- Family: Cerambycidae
- Subfamily: Cerambycinae
- Tribe: Cerambycini
- Genus: Xestiodion
- Species: X. pictipes

Binomial name
- Xestiodion pictipes (Newman, 1838)

Synonyms
- Coleoxestia pictipes Aurivillius, 1912; Criodion 8-maculatum Nonfried, 1894; Criodion octomaculatum Aurivillius, 1912; Criodion pictipes Thomson, 1861; Xestia pictipes White, 1853

= Xestiodion pictipes =

Species of beetle

Xestiodion pictipes is a species in the longhorn beetle family Cerambycidae. It is found in Brazil and French Guiana.

This species was described by Edward Newman in 1838.
