= Metopivaria elongata =

Scientific classification
- Kingdom: Animalia
- Phylum: Arthropoda
- Class: Insecta
- Order: Coleoptera
- Suborder: Polyphaga
- Infraorder: Cucujiformia
- Family: Cerambycidae
- Genus: Metopivaria
- Species: M. elongata

Binomial name
- Metopivaria elongata (Breuning, 1976)

Synonyms
- Heterometopia elongata Breuning, 1976

Species of beetle

Metopivaria elongata is a species of beetle in the family Cerambycidae. It was described by Stephan von Breuning in 1976, originally under the genus Heterometopia.
