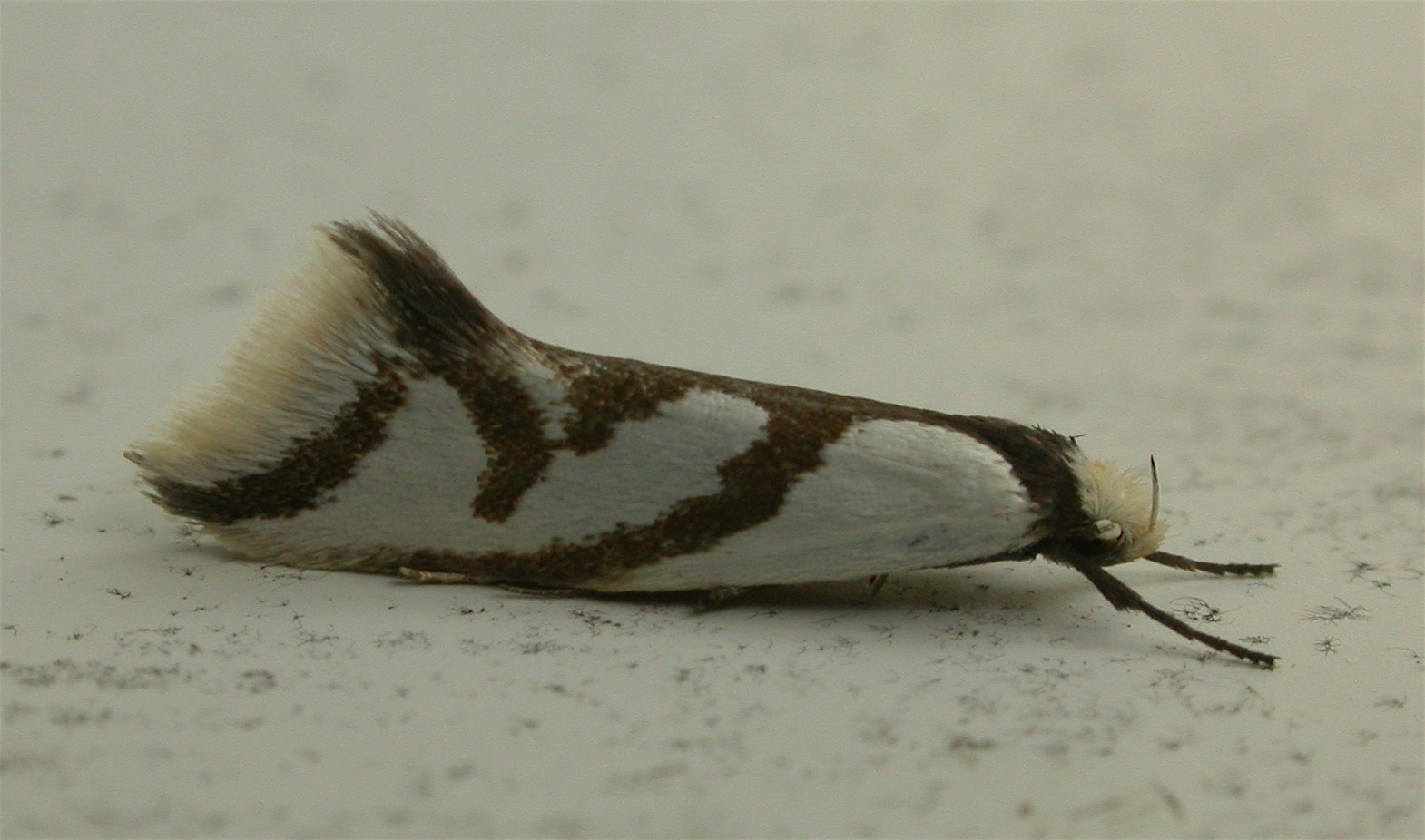

Scientific classification
- Kingdom: Animalia
- Phylum: Arthropoda
- Clade: Pancrustacea
- Class: Insecta
- Order: Lepidoptera
- Family: Oecophoridae
- Genus: Ocystola
- Species: O. paulinella

Binomial name
- Ocystola paulinella Newman, 1855

= Ocystola paulinella =

Species of moth

Ocystola paulinella is a moth of the family Oecophoridae. It is found in Australia.
