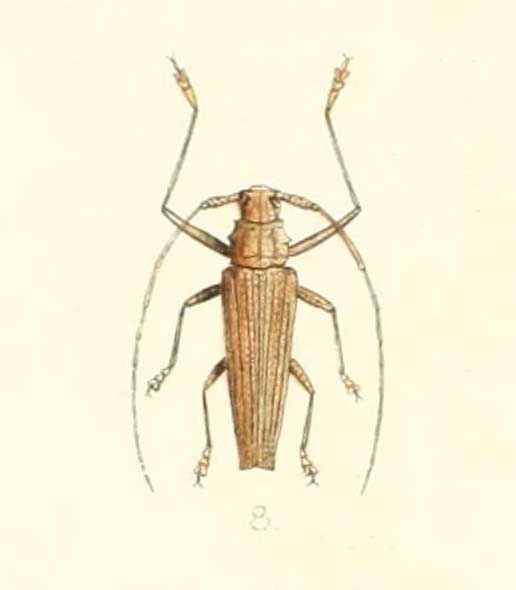
- Homonoea uniformis

Scientific classification
- Domain: Eukaryota
- Kingdom: Animalia
- Phylum: Arthropoda
- Class: Insecta
- Order: Coleoptera
- Suborder: Polyphaga
- Infraorder: Cucujiformia
- Family: Cerambycidae
- Subfamily: Lamiinae
- Tribe: Homonoeini
- Genus: Homonoea; Newman, 1842

Species
- See text

= Homonoea =

Genus of beetles

Homonoea is a genus of longhorn beetles of the subfamily Lamiinae, containing the following species:

subgenus Homonoea

- Homonoea albosignata Breuning, 1950
- Homonoea boudanti Hüdepohl, 1995
- Homonoea flavescens Breuning, 1958
- Homonoea ornamentalis Heller, 1926
- Homonoea pannosa Newman, 1842
- Homonoea patrona Newman, 1842
- Homonoea praecisa Newman, 1842
- Homonoea rotundipennis Breuning, 1950
- Homonoea samarana (Heller, 1924)
- Homonoea uniformis Jordan, 1894

subgenus Urocalymna

- Homonoea longimana (Westwood, 1822)
