= Homonoea praecisa =

Scientific classification
- Kingdom: Animalia
- Phylum: Arthropoda
- Class: Insecta
- Order: Coleoptera
- Suborder: Polyphaga
- Infraorder: Cucujiformia
- Family: Cerambycidae
- Genus: Homonoea
- Species: H. praecisa

Binomial name
- Homonoea praecisa Newman, 1842

Species of beetle

Homonoea praecisa is a species of beetle in the family Cerambycidae. It was described by Edward Newman in 1842. It is known from the Philippines and Borneo.
