= Metopivaria brunnea =

Scientific classification
- Kingdom: Animalia
- Phylum: Arthropoda
- Class: Insecta
- Order: Coleoptera
- Suborder: Polyphaga
- Infraorder: Cucujiformia
- Family: Cerambycidae
- Genus: Metopivaria
- Species: M. brunnea

Binomial name
- Metopivaria brunnea (Aurivillius, 1923)

Synonyms
- Heteroclytomorpha brunnea Aurivillius, 1923; Heterometopia brunnea (Aurivillius) Breuning, 1950

Species of beetle

Metopivaria brunnea is a species of beetle in the family Cerambycidae. It was described by Per Olof Christopher Aurivillius in 1923, originally under the genus Heteroclytomorpha.
