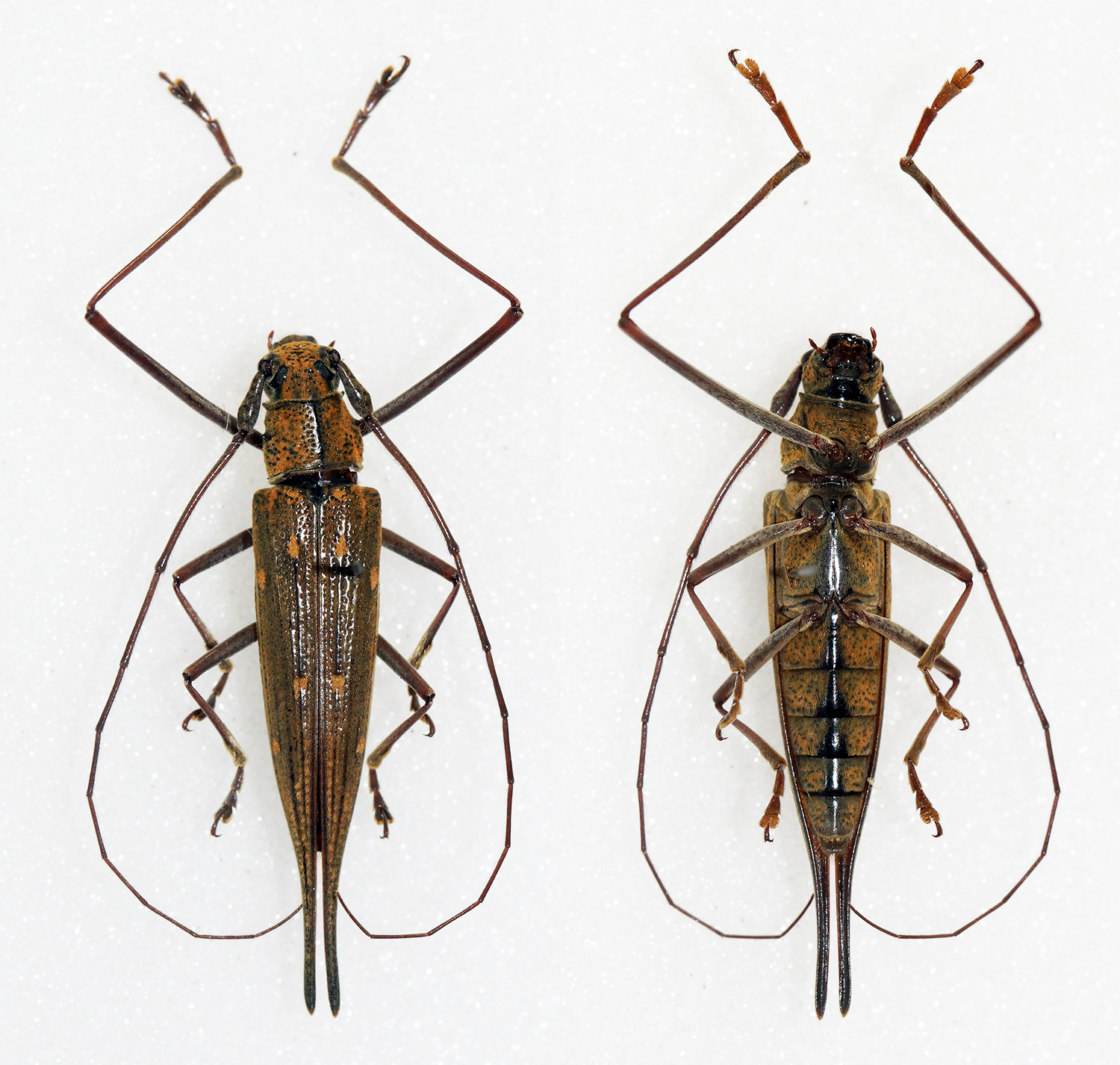

Scientific classification
- Kingdom: Animalia
- Phylum: Arthropoda
- Class: Insecta
- Order: Coleoptera
- Suborder: Polyphaga
- Infraorder: Cucujiformia
- Family: Cerambycidae
- Genus: Homonoea
- Species: H. longimana

Binomial name
- Homonoea longimana (Westwood, 1841)

Synonyms
- Homonoea longimana m. albopunctata Breuning, 1980

= Homonoea longimana =

Species of beetle

Homonoea longimana is a species of beetle in the family Cerambycidae. It was described by John O. Westwood in 1841. It is known from Borneo and the Philippines.
