= Heteroclytomorpha sormeoides =

Scientific classification
- Kingdom: Animalia
- Phylum: Arthropoda
- Class: Insecta
- Order: Coleoptera
- Suborder: Polyphaga
- Infraorder: Cucujiformia
- Family: Cerambycidae
- Genus: Heteroclytomorpha
- Species: H. sormeoides

Binomial name
- Heteroclytomorpha sormeoides Aurivillius, 1908

Species of beetle

Heteroclytomorpha sormeoides is a species of beetle in the family Cerambycidae. It was described by Per Olof Christopher Aurivillius in 1908.

== Subspecies ==
- Heteroclytomorpha sormeoides ammiralis Breuning, 1956
- Heteroclytomorpha sormeoides salomonum Breuning, 1950
- Heteroclytomorpha sormeoides sormeoides Aurivillius, 1908
