= Notomulciber albosetosus =

Scientific classification
- Kingdom: Animalia
- Phylum: Arthropoda
- Class: Insecta
- Order: Coleoptera
- Suborder: Polyphaga
- Infraorder: Cucujiformia
- Family: Cerambycidae
- Genus: Notomulciber
- Species: N. albosetosus

Binomial name
- Notomulciber albosetosus Heller, 1923

Synonyms
- Micromulciber albosetosus Heller, 1923

Species of beetle

Notomulciber albosetosus is a species of beetle in the family Cerambycidae. It was described by Heller in 1923. It is known from Borneo.
