= Bumetopia oscitans =

Scientific classification
- Kingdom: Animalia
- Phylum: Arthropoda
- Class: Insecta
- Order: Coleoptera
- Suborder: Polyphaga
- Infraorder: Cucujiformia
- Family: Cerambycidae
- Genus: Bumetopia
- Species: B. oscitans

Binomial name
- Bumetopia oscitans Pascoe, 1858

Species of beetle

Bumetopia oscitans is a species of beetle in the family Cerambycidae. It was described by Francis Polkinghorne Pascoe in 1858.

== Subspecies ==
- Bumetopia oscitans oscitans Pascoe, 1858
- Bumetopia oscitans senkakuana Hayashi, 1972
