= Bumetopia bakeri =

Scientific classification
- Kingdom: Animalia
- Phylum: Arthropoda
- Class: Insecta
- Order: Coleoptera
- Suborder: Polyphaga
- Infraorder: Cucujiformia
- Family: Cerambycidae
- Genus: Bumetopia
- Species: B. bakeri

Binomial name
- Bumetopia bakeri (Aurivillius, 1927)

Synonyms
- Homonaeomorpha bakeri Aurivillius, 1927

Species of beetle

Bumetopia bakeri is a species of beetle in the family Cerambycidae. It was described by Per Olof Christopher Aurivillius in 1927 and is known from the Philippines.
