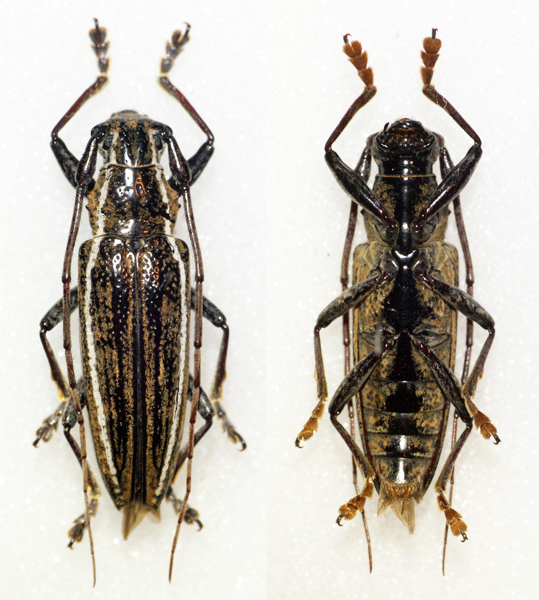

Scientific classification
- Kingdom: Animalia
- Phylum: Arthropoda
- Class: Insecta
- Order: Coleoptera
- Suborder: Polyphaga
- Infraorder: Cucujiformia
- Family: Cerambycidae
- Genus: Bumetopia
- Species: B. bilinea

Binomial name
- Bumetopia bilinea (Newman, 1842)

Synonyms
- Homonoea bilinea Newman, 1842

= Bumetopia bilinea =

Species of beetle

Bumetopia bilinea is a species of beetle in the family Cerambycidae. It was described by Newman in 1842. It is known from the Philippines.
