= Homonoea ornamentalis =

Scientific classification
- Kingdom: Animalia
- Phylum: Arthropoda
- Class: Insecta
- Order: Coleoptera
- Suborder: Polyphaga
- Infraorder: Cucujiformia
- Family: Cerambycidae
- Genus: Homonoea
- Species: H. ornamentalis

Binomial name
- Homonoea ornamentalis Heller, 1926

Species of beetle

Homonoea ornamentalis is a species of beetle in the family Cerambycidae. It was described by Heller in 1926. It is known from the Philippines.

== Subspecies ==
- Homonoea ornamentalis mindanaonis Breuning, 1980
- Homonoea ornamentalis ornamentalis Heller, 1926
