= Bumetopia sakishimana =

Scientific classification
- Kingdom: Animalia
- Phylum: Arthropoda
- Class: Insecta
- Order: Coleoptera
- Suborder: Polyphaga
- Infraorder: Cucujiformia
- Family: Cerambycidae
- Genus: Bumetopia
- Species: B. sakishimana

Binomial name
- Bumetopia sakishimana Hayashi, 1966

Species of beetle

Bumetopia sakishimana is a species of beetle in the family Cerambycidae. It was described by Hayashi in 1966.

== Subspecies ==
- Bumetopia sakishimana ishigaki Hayashi, 1966
- Bumetopia sakishimana sakishimana Hayashi, 1966
- Bumetopia sakishimana yonaguni Hayashi, 1966
