= Anapausa =

Scientific classification
- Domain: Eukaryota
- Kingdom: Animalia
- Phylum: Arthropoda
- Class: Insecta
- Order: Coleoptera
- Suborder: Polyphaga
- Infraorder: Cucujiformia
- Family: Cerambycidae
- Tribe: Homonoeini
- Genus: Anapausa

Genus of beetles

Anapausa is a genus of longhorn beetles of the subfamily Lamiinae, containing the following species:

- Anapausa armata Thomson, 1864
- Anapausa longipennis Breuning, 1966
- Anapausa rugifrons Breuning, 1951
