= Notomulciber quadrisignatus =

Scientific classification
- Kingdom: Animalia
- Phylum: Arthropoda
- Class: Insecta
- Order: Coleoptera
- Suborder: Polyphaga
- Infraorder: Cucujiformia
- Family: Cerambycidae
- Genus: Notomulciber
- Species: N. quadrisignatus

Binomial name
- Notomulciber quadrisignatus (Schwarzer, 1925)

Synonyms
- Kamikiria plagiata Matsushita, 1933; Micromulciber quadrisignatus Schwarzer, 1925

Species of beetle

Notomulciber quadrisignatus is a species of beetle in the family Cerambycidae. It was described by Bernhard Schwarzer in 1925, originally under the genus Micromulciber. It is known from Taiwan.
