= Notomulciber travancorensis =

Scientific classification
- Kingdom: Animalia
- Phylum: Arthropoda
- Class: Insecta
- Order: Coleoptera
- Suborder: Polyphaga
- Infraorder: Cucujiformia
- Family: Cerambycidae
- Genus: Notomulciber
- Species: N. travancorensis

Binomial name
- Notomulciber travancorensis (Breuning, 1958)

Synonyms
- Micromulciber travancorensis (Breuning, 1958)

Species of beetle

Notomulciber travancorensis is a species of beetle in the family Cerambycidae. It was described by Stephan von Breuning in 1958.
