= Notomulciber strandi =

Scientific classification
- Kingdom: Animalia
- Phylum: Arthropoda
- Class: Insecta
- Order: Coleoptera
- Suborder: Polyphaga
- Infraorder: Cucujiformia
- Family: Cerambycidae
- Genus: Notomulciber
- Species: N. strandi

Binomial name
- Notomulciber strandi (Breuning, 1939)

Synonyms
- Micromulciber strandi Breuning, 1939

Species of beetle

Notomulciber strandi is a species of beetle in the family Cerambycidae. It was described by Stephan von Breuning in 1939. It is known from Sri Lanka.

It's 11 mm long and 3¼ mm wide, and its type locality is Bogawantalawa, Sri Lanka. It was named in honor of Embrik Strand, in whose Festschrift the species description was written.
