= Bumetopia brevicornis =

Scientific classification
- Kingdom: Animalia
- Phylum: Arthropoda
- Class: Insecta
- Order: Coleoptera
- Suborder: Polyphaga
- Infraorder: Cucujiformia
- Family: Cerambycidae
- Genus: Bumetopia
- Species: B. brevicornis

Binomial name
- Bumetopia brevicornis Makihara, 1978

Species of beetle

Bumetopia brevicornis is a species of beetle in the family Cerambycidae. It was described by Hiroshi Makihara in 1978. It is known from Japan. It measures between 9 and 10 mm (0.35 and 0.39 in).
