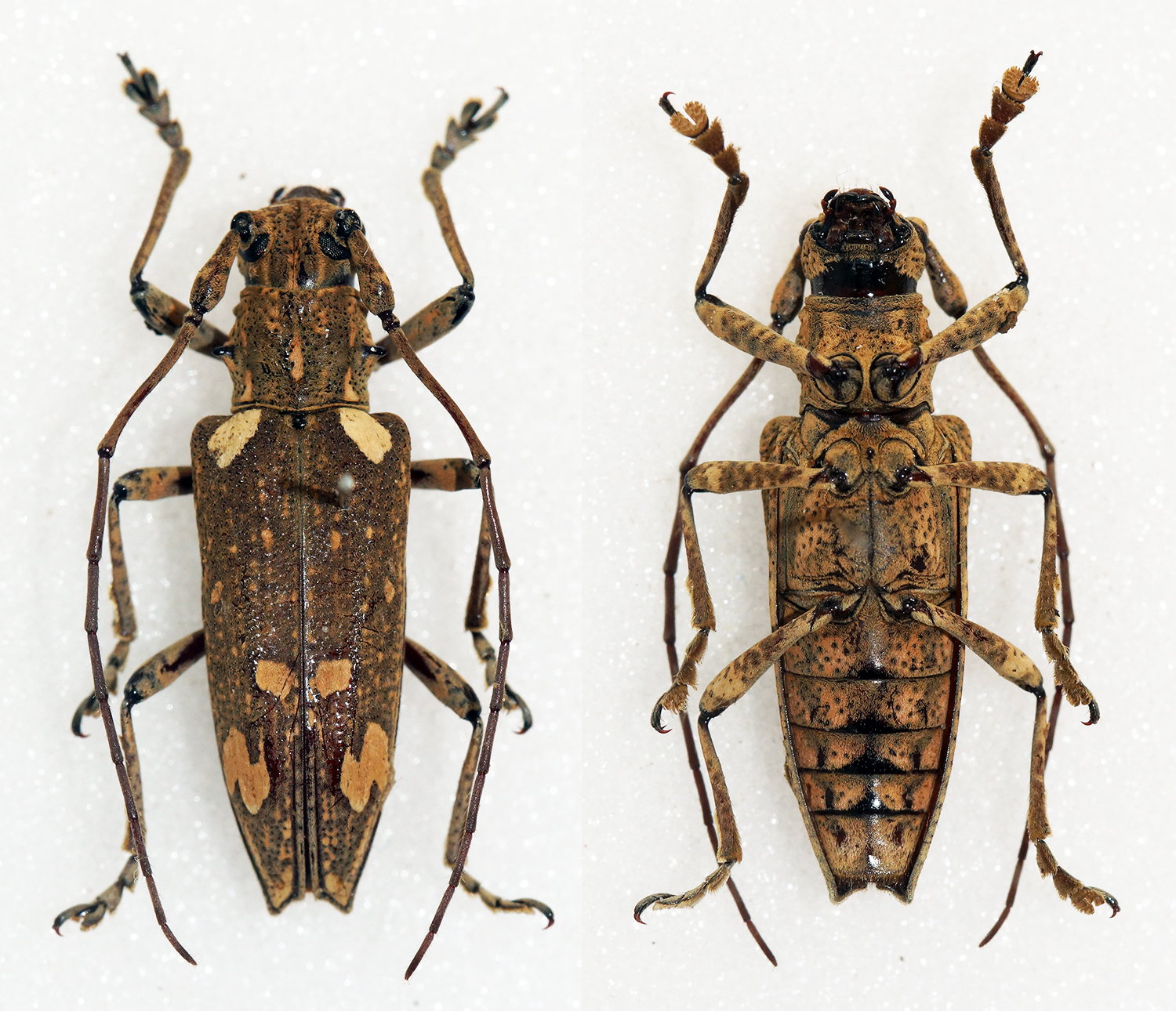
- Trachelophora maculosa

Scientific classification
- Kingdom: Animalia
- Phylum: Arthropoda
- Class: Insecta
- Order: Coleoptera
- Suborder: Polyphaga
- Infraorder: Cucujiformia
- Family: Cerambycidae
- Subfamily: Lamiinae
- Tribe: Homonoeini
- Genus: Trachelophora; Perroud, 1855

= Trachelophora =

Genus of beetles

Trachelophora is a genus of longhorn beetles of the subfamily Lamiinae, containing the following species:

- Trachelophora affinis Breuning, 1982
- Trachelophora curvicollis Perroud, 1855
- Trachelophora lineata Aurivillius, 1923
- Trachelophora maculosa Aurivillius, 1923
- Trachelophora niasica Aurivillius, 1923
