= Mulciber rosselli =

Scientific classification
- Kingdom: Animalia
- Phylum: Arthropoda
- Class: Insecta
- Order: Coleoptera
- Suborder: Polyphaga
- Infraorder: Cucujiformia
- Family: Cerambycidae
- Genus: Mulciber
- Species: M. rosselli

Binomial name
- Mulciber rosselli Breuning, 1970

Species of beetle

Mulciber rosselli is a species of beetle in the family Cerambycidae. It was described by Stephan von Breuning in 1970.
