= Trachelophora affinis =

Scientific classification
- Kingdom: Animalia
- Phylum: Arthropoda
- Class: Insecta
- Order: Coleoptera
- Suborder: Polyphaga
- Infraorder: Cucujiformia
- Family: Cerambycidae
- Genus: Trachelophora
- Species: T. affinis

Binomial name
- Trachelophora affinis Breuning, 1982

Species of beetle

Trachelophora affinis is a species of beetle in the family Cerambycidae. It was described by Stephan von Breuning in 1982. It is known from Borneo.
