= Notomulciber notatus =

Scientific classification
- Kingdom: Animalia
- Phylum: Arthropoda
- Clade: Pancrustacea
- Class: Insecta
- Order: Coleoptera
- Suborder: Polyphaga
- Infraorder: Cucujiformia
- Family: Cerambycidae
- Genus: Notomulciber
- Species: N. notatus

Binomial name
- Notomulciber notatus (Fisher, 1936)

Synonyms
- Micromulciber notatus Fisher, 1936

Species of beetle

Notomulciber notatus is a species of beetle in the family Cerambycidae. It was described by Fisher in 1936, originally under the genus Micromulciber. It is known from Java.
