= Bumetopia ohshimana =

Scientific classification
- Kingdom: Animalia
- Phylum: Arthropoda
- Class: Insecta
- Order: Coleoptera
- Suborder: Polyphaga
- Infraorder: Cucujiformia
- Family: Cerambycidae
- Genus: Bumetopia
- Species: B. ohshimana

Binomial name
- Bumetopia ohshimana Breuning, 1939

Synonyms
- Bumetopia oshimana Breuning, 1939

Species of beetle

Bumetopia ohshimana is a species of beetle in the family Cerambycidae. It was described by Stephan von Breuning in 1939.

== Subspecies ==
- Bumetopia ohshimana heiana Hayashi, 1963
- Bumetopia ohshimana ohshimana Breuning, 1939
