= Grynex lineatus =

Scientific classification
- Kingdom: Animalia
- Phylum: Arthropoda
- Class: Insecta
- Order: Coleoptera
- Suborder: Polyphaga
- Infraorder: Cucujiformia
- Family: Cerambycidae
- Genus: Grynex
- Species: G. lineatus

Binomial name
- Grynex lineatus Pascoe, 1888

Species of beetle

Grynex lineatus is a species of beetle in the family Cerambycidae. It was described by Francis Polkinghorne Pascoe in 1888.
