= Catapausa albaria =

Scientific classification
- Domain: Eukaryota
- Kingdom: Animalia
- Phylum: Arthropoda
- Class: Insecta
- Order: Coleoptera
- Suborder: Polyphaga
- Infraorder: Cucujiformia
- Family: Cerambycidae
- Genus: Catapausa
- Species: C. albaria

Binomial name
- Catapausa albaria Heller, 1926

Species of beetle

Catapausa albaria is a species of beetle in the family Cerambycidae. It was described by Heller in 1926. It is known from Papua New Guinea.
