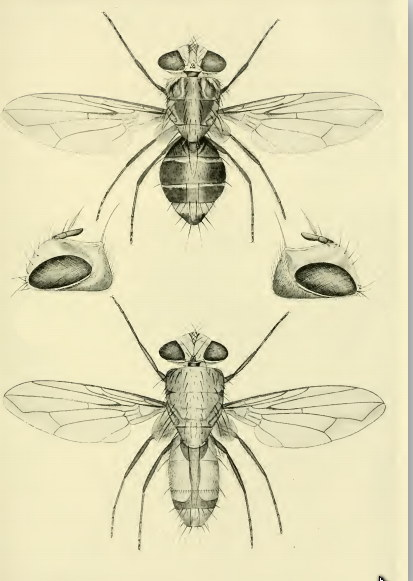
- Heterometopia argentea, top: male fly; below; female fly

Scientific classification
- Kingdom: Animalia
- Phylum: Arthropoda
- Clade: Pancrustacea
- Class: Insecta
- Order: Diptera
- Family: Tachinidae
- Subfamily: Dexiinae
- Tribe: Dexiini
- Genus: Heterometopia
- Species: H. argentea

Binomial name
- Heterometopia argentea Macquart, 1846

Synonyms
- Heterometopia analis Macquart, 1851; Heterometopia rufipalpis Macquart, 1847; Omalogaster limbinevris Macquart, 1846; Omalogaster nitidus Macquart, 1846

= Heterometopia argentea =

Species of fly

Heterometopia argentea is a species of fly in the family Tachinidae.

== Distribution ==
Tasmania.
