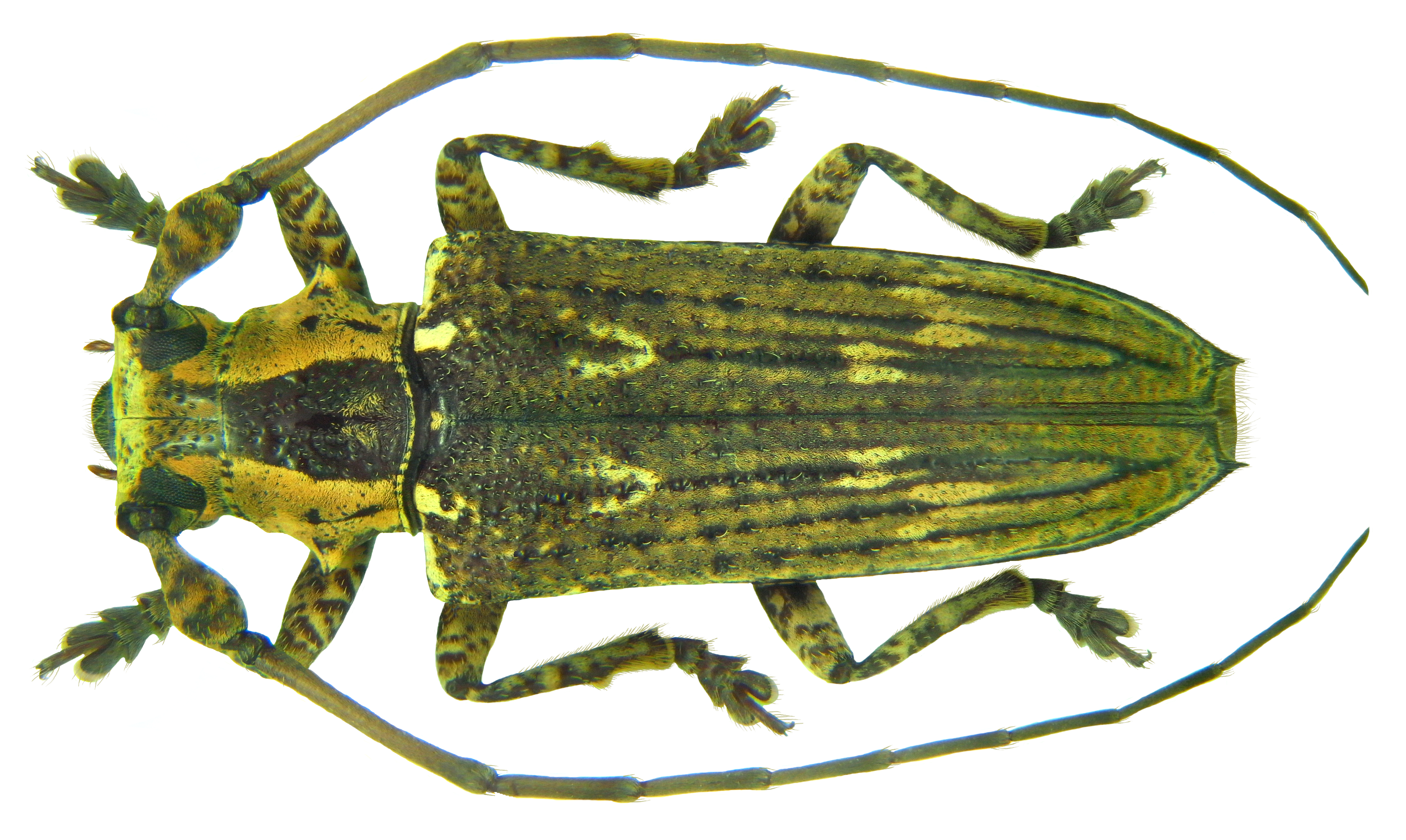

Scientific classification
- Kingdom: Animalia
- Phylum: Arthropoda
- Class: Insecta
- Order: Coleoptera
- Suborder: Polyphaga
- Infraorder: Cucujiformia
- Family: Cerambycidae
- Genus: Mulciber
- Species: M. undulatoides

Binomial name
- Mulciber undulatoides Breuning, 1940

= Mulciber undulatoides =

Species of beetle

Mulciber undulatoides is a species of beetle in the family Cerambycidae. It was described by Stephan Von Breuning in 1940.
