= Mulciber linnei =

Scientific classification
- Kingdom: Animalia
- Phylum: Arthropoda
- Class: Insecta
- Order: Coleoptera
- Suborder: Polyphaga
- Infraorder: Cucujiformia
- Family: Cerambycidae
- Genus: Mulciber
- Species: M. linnei

Binomial name
- Mulciber linnei Thomson, 1864

Species of beetle

Mulciber linnei is a species of beetle in the family Cerambycidae. It was described by James Thomson in 1864.
