= Mulciber lineatus =

Scientific classification
- Domain: Eukaryota
- Kingdom: Animalia
- Phylum: Arthropoda
- Class: Insecta
- Order: Coleoptera
- Suborder: Polyphaga
- Infraorder: Cucujiformia
- Family: Cerambycidae
- Genus: Mulciber
- Species: M. lineatus

Binomial name
- Mulciber lineatus Aurivillius, 1920

Species of beetle

Mulciber lineatus is a species of beetle in the family Cerambycidae. It was described by Per Olof Christopher Aurivillius in 1920.
