= Notomulciber flavolineatus =

Scientific classification
- Kingdom: Animalia
- Phylum: Arthropoda
- Class: Insecta
- Order: Coleoptera
- Suborder: Polyphaga
- Infraorder: Cucujiformia
- Family: Cerambycidae
- Genus: Notomulciber
- Species: N. flavolineatus

Binomial name
- Notomulciber flavolineatus Breuning, 1947

Synonyms
- Micromulciber flavolineatus (Breuning, 1947)

Species of beetle

Notomulciber flavolineatus is a species of beetle in the family Cerambycidae. It was described by Stephan von Breuning in 1947. It is known from Borneo.
