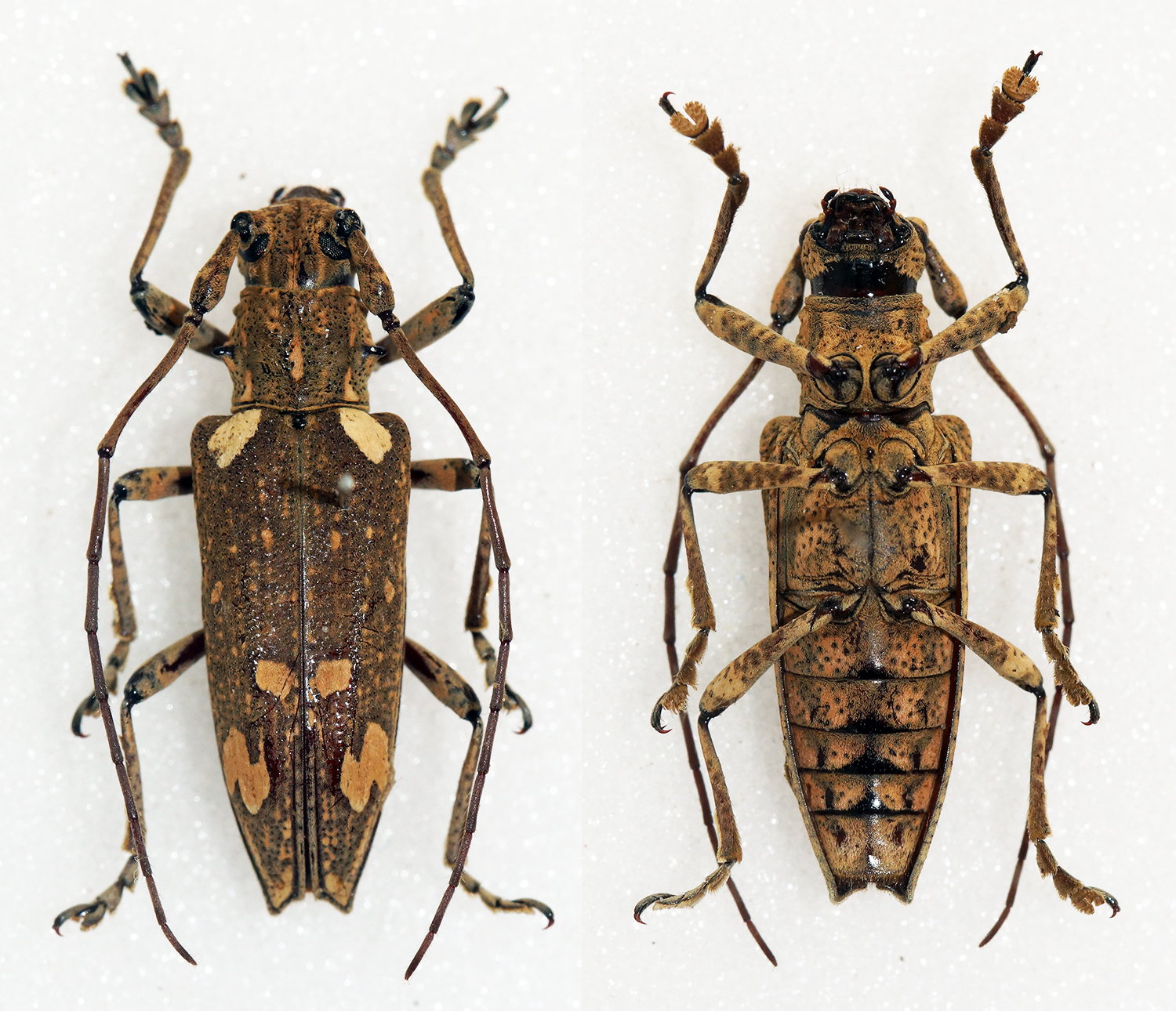

Scientific classification
- Kingdom: Animalia
- Phylum: Arthropoda
- Class: Insecta
- Order: Coleoptera
- Suborder: Polyphaga
- Infraorder: Cucujiformia
- Family: Cerambycidae
- Genus: Trachelophora
- Species: T. maculosa

Binomial name
- Trachelophora maculosa Aurivillius, 1923

= Trachelophora maculosa =

Species of beetle

Trachelophora maculosa is a species of beetle in the family Cerambycidae. It was described by Per Olof Christopher Aurivillius in 1923. It is known to be found in Borneo.
