= Notomulciber sumatrensis =

Scientific classification
- Kingdom: Animalia
- Phylum: Arthropoda
- Class: Insecta
- Order: Coleoptera
- Suborder: Polyphaga
- Infraorder: Cucujiformia
- Family: Cerambycidae
- Genus: Notomulciber
- Species: N. sumatrensis

Binomial name
- Notomulciber sumatrensis (Schwarzer, 1930)

Synonyms
- Micromulciber sumatrensis Schwarzer, 1930

Species of beetle

Notomulciber sumatrensis is a species of beetle in the family Cerambycidae. It was described by Bernhard Schwarzer in 1930. It is known from Sumatra.
