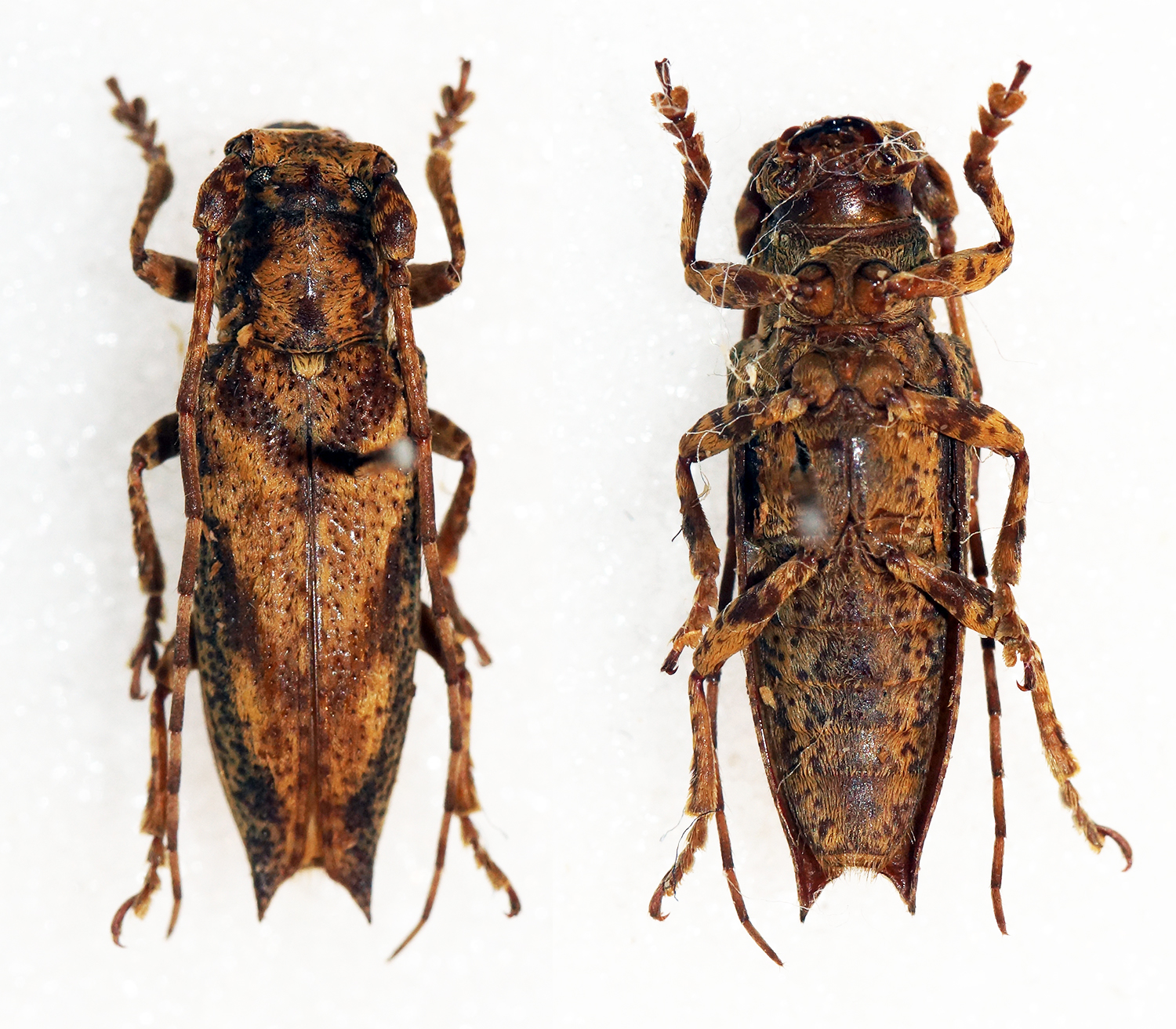

Scientific classification
- Kingdom: Animalia
- Phylum: Arthropoda
- Class: Insecta
- Order: Coleoptera
- Suborder: Polyphaga
- Infraorder: Cucujiformia
- Family: Cerambycidae
- Genus: Notomulciber
- Species: N. fuscomarginatus

Binomial name
- Notomulciber fuscomarginatus (Aurivillius, 1914)

Synonyms
- Micromulciber fuscomarginatus Aurivillius, 1914

= Notomulciber fuscomarginatus =

Species of beetle

Notomulciber fuscomarginatus is a species of beetle in the family Cerambycidae. It was described by Per Olof Christopher Aurivillius in 1914 and is known from Borneo.
