= Notomulciber carpentariae =

Scientific classification
- Kingdom: Animalia
- Phylum: Arthropoda
- Class: Insecta
- Order: Coleoptera
- Suborder: Polyphaga
- Infraorder: Cucujiformia
- Family: Cerambycidae
- Genus: Notomulciber
- Species: N. carpentariae

Binomial name
- Notomulciber carpentariae Blackburn, 1894

Species of beetle

Notomulciber carpentariae is a species of beetle in the family Cerambycidae. It was described by Blackburn in 1894. It is known from Australia.
