= Grynex martini =

Scientific classification
- Kingdom: Animalia
- Phylum: Arthropoda
- Class: Insecta
- Order: Coleoptera
- Suborder: Polyphaga
- Infraorder: Cucujiformia
- Family: Cerambycidae
- Genus: Grynex
- Species: G. martini

Binomial name
- Grynex martini (Allard, 1894)

Synonyms
- Spinestima divaricata Pic, 1925; Temnosternus martini Allard, 1894

Species of beetle

Grynex martini is a species of beetle in the family Cerambycidae. It was described by Allard in 1894. It is known from Australia.
