= Notomulciber javanicus =

Scientific classification
- Kingdom: Animalia
- Phylum: Arthropoda
- Class: Insecta
- Order: Coleoptera
- Suborder: Polyphaga
- Infraorder: Cucujiformia
- Family: Cerambycidae
- Genus: Notomulciber
- Species: N. javanicus

Binomial name
- Notomulciber javanicus (Breuning, 1956)

Synonyms
- Micromulciber javanicus (Breuning, 1956)

Species of beetle

Notomulciber javanicus is a species of beetle in the family Cerambycidae. It was described by Stephan von Breuning in 1956.
