= Paramulciber =

Scientific classification
- Kingdom: Animalia
- Phylum: Arthropoda
- Class: Insecta
- Order: Coleoptera
- Suborder: Polyphaga
- Infraorder: Cucujiformia
- Family: Cerambycidae
- Tribe: Homonoeini
- Genus: Paramulciber; Breuning, 1939
- Species: P. flavosignatus

Binomial name
- Paramulciber flavosignatus Breuning, 1939

Genus of beetles

Paramulciber flavosignatus is a species of beetle in the family Cerambycidae, and the only species in the genus Paramulciber. It was described by Breuning in 1939.

It's 17.5 mm long and 5.25 mm wide, and its type locality is Mt. Matang, Borneo.
