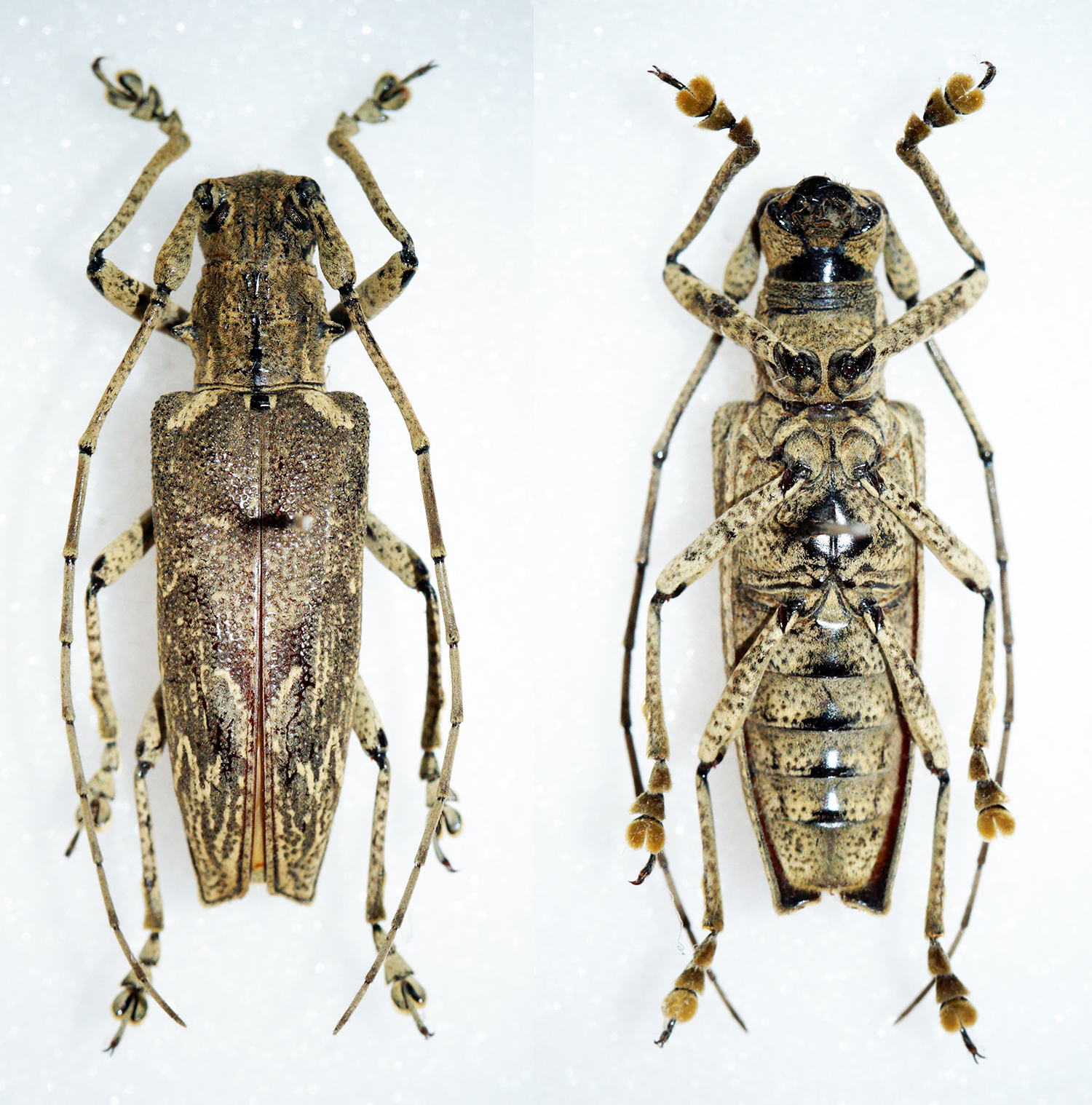

Scientific classification
- Kingdom: Animalia
- Phylum: Arthropoda
- Clade: Pancrustacea
- Class: Insecta
- Order: Coleoptera
- Suborder: Polyphaga
- Infraorder: Cucujiformia
- Family: Cerambycidae
- Genus: Trachelophora
- Species: T. curvicollis

Binomial name
- Trachelophora curvicollis Perroud, 1855

= Trachelophora curvicollis =

Species of beetle

Trachelophora curvicollis is a species of beetle in the family Cerambycidae. It was described by Perroud in 1855. It is known from Malaysia, Java, and Sumatra.
