= Metamulciber ziczac =

Scientific classification
- Kingdom: Animalia
- Phylum: Arthropoda
- Class: Insecta
- Order: Coleoptera
- Suborder: Polyphaga
- Infraorder: Cucujiformia
- Family: Cerambycidae
- Genus: Metamulciber
- Species: M. ziczac

Binomial name
- Metamulciber ziczac Breuning, 1947

Species of beetle

Metamulciber ziczac is a species of beetle in the family Cerambycidae. It was described by Stephan von Breuning in 1947. It is known from Papua New Guinea.
