= Bumetopia stolata =

Scientific classification
- Kingdom: Animalia
- Phylum: Arthropoda
- Class: Insecta
- Order: Coleoptera
- Suborder: Polyphaga
- Infraorder: Cucujiformia
- Family: Cerambycidae
- Genus: Bumetopia
- Species: B. stolata

Binomial name
- Bumetopia stolata (Matsushita, 1931)

Synonyms
- Tmesisternus stolatus Matsushita, 1931

Species of beetle

Bumetopia stolata is a species of beetle in the family Cerambycidae. It was described by Masaki Matsushita in 1931. It is known from Taiwan.
