= Heteroclytomorpha inaequalis =

Scientific classification
- Kingdom: Animalia
- Phylum: Arthropoda
- Class: Insecta
- Order: Coleoptera
- Suborder: Polyphaga
- Infraorder: Cucujiformia
- Family: Cerambycidae
- Genus: Heteroclytomorpha
- Species: H. inaequalis

Binomial name
- Heteroclytomorpha inaequalis Aurivillius, 1908

Species of beetle

Heteroclytomorpha inaequalis is a species of beetle in the family Cerambycidae. It was described by Per Olof Christopher Aurivillius in 1908 and is known from Papua New Guinea.
