= Bumetopia aliena =

Scientific classification
- Kingdom: Animalia
- Phylum: Arthropoda
- Class: Insecta
- Order: Coleoptera
- Suborder: Polyphaga
- Infraorder: Cucujiformia
- Family: Cerambycidae
- Genus: Bumetopia
- Species: B. aliena

Binomial name
- Bumetopia aliena (Newman, 1842)

Synonyms
- Homonoea aliena Newman, 1842

Species of beetle

Bumetopia aliena is a species of beetle in the family Cerambycidae. It was described by Newman in 1842. It is known from the Philippines.
