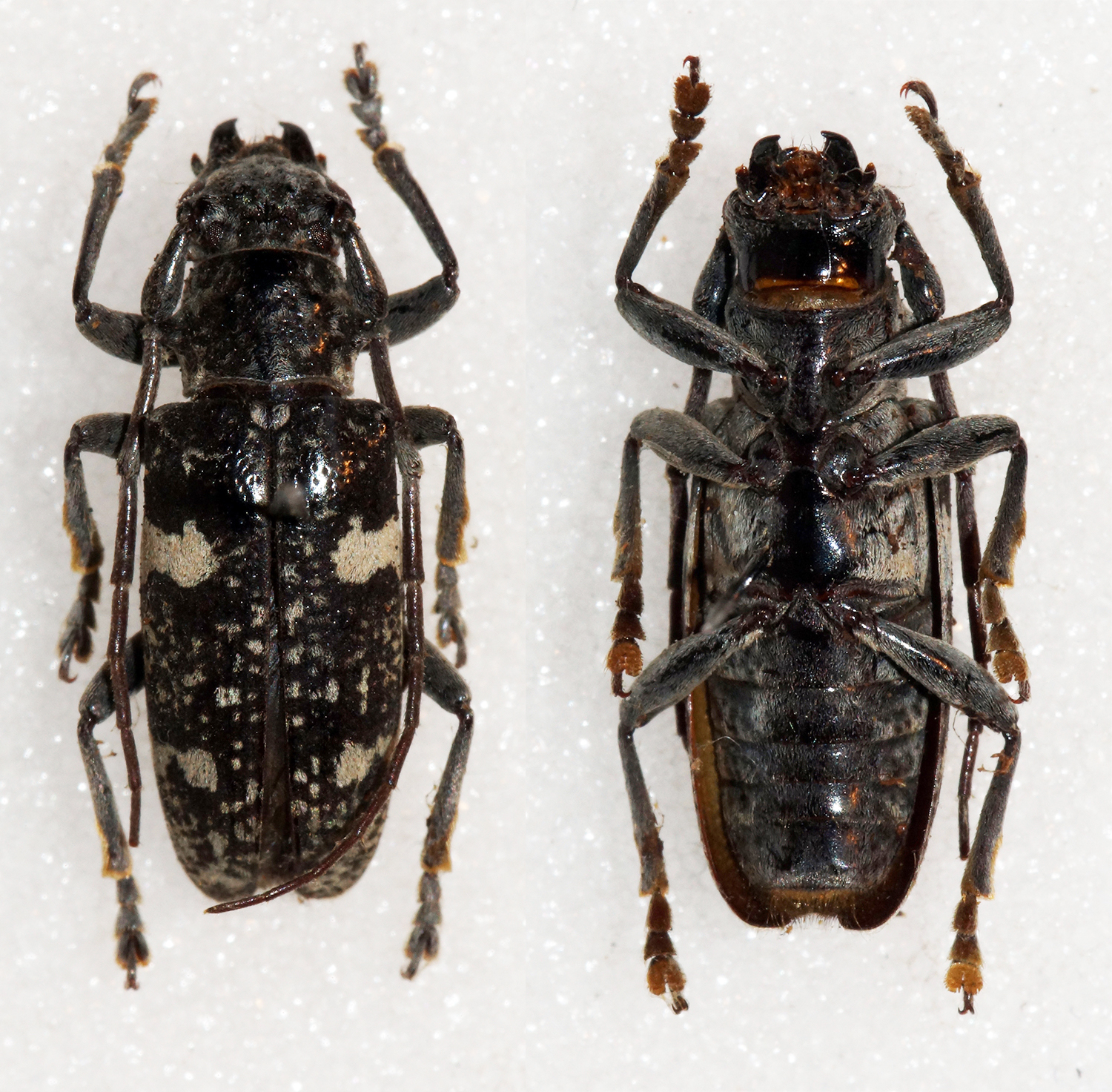
- Bumetopia intermedia

Scientific classification
- Kingdom: Animalia
- Phylum: Arthropoda
- Class: Insecta
- Order: Coleoptera
- Suborder: Polyphaga
- Infraorder: Cucujiformia
- Family: Cerambycidae
- Subfamily: Lamiinae
- Tribe: Homonoeini
- Genus: Bumetopia; Pascoe, 1858

= Bumetopia =

Genus of beetles

Bumetopia is a genus of longhorn beetles of the subfamily Lamiinae, containing the following species:

subgenus Bumetopia

- Bumetopia albovittata Breuning, 1950
- Bumetopia aliena (Newman, 1842)
- Bumetopia bakeri (Aurivillius, 1927)
- Bumetopia bilinea (Newman, 1842)
- Bumetopia borneensis Breuning, 1969
- Bumetopia brevicornis Makihara, 1978
- Bumetopia conspersa (Aurivillius, 1924)
- Bumetopia elongata Breuning, 1972
- Bumetopia flavomarmorata Breuning, 1947
- Bumetopia flavovariegata (Aurivillius, 1911)
- Bumetopia fornicata (Newman, 1842)
- Bumetopia fornicatoides Breuning, 1980
- Bumetopia intermedia Breuning, 1947
- Bumetopia japonica (Thomson, 1868)
- Bumetopia ohshimana Breuning, 1939
- Bumetopia oscitans Pascoe, 1858
- Bumetopia panayensis Breuning, 1950
- Bumetopia quadripunctata (Heller, 1923)
- Bumetopia sakishimana Hayashi, 1966
- Bumetopia schultzei Breuning, 1950
- Bumetopia sexpunctata Breuning & de Jong, 1941
- Bumetopia stolata (Matsushita, 1931)
- Bumetopia uniformis Breuning, 1939
- Bumetopia yagii Hayashi, 1994

subgenus Siela

- Bumetopia trigonocephala Heller, 1923
- Bumetopia vittipennis Breuning, 1970
