= Heteroclytomorpha quadrinotata =

Scientific classification
- Kingdom: Animalia
- Phylum: Arthropoda
- Class: Insecta
- Order: Coleoptera
- Suborder: Polyphaga
- Infraorder: Cucujiformia
- Family: Cerambycidae
- Genus: Heteroclytomorpha
- Species: H. quadrinotata

Binomial name
- Heteroclytomorpha quadrinotata Blanchard, 1853

Species of beetle

Heteroclytomorpha quadrinotata is a species of beetle in the family Cerambycidae. It was described by Blanchard in 1853. It is known from the Solomon Islands.
