= Metamulciber =

Scientific classification
- Kingdom: Animalia
- Phylum: Arthropoda
- Class: Insecta
- Order: Coleoptera
- Suborder: Polyphaga
- Infraorder: Cucujiformia
- Family: Cerambycidae
- Subfamily: Lamiinae
- Tribe: Homonoeini
- Genus: Metamulciber; Breuning, 1940

Genus of beetles

Metamulciber is a genus of longhorn beetles of the subfamily Lamiinae, containing the following species:

- Metamulciber albostriatus Breuning, 1940
- Metamulciber geometricus Breuning,
- Metamulciber ochreolineatus Breuning, 1947
- Metamulciber ziczac Breuning, 1947
