= Notomulciber gressitti =

Scientific classification
- Kingdom: Animalia
- Phylum: Arthropoda
- Class: Insecta
- Order: Coleoptera
- Suborder: Polyphaga
- Infraorder: Cucujiformia
- Family: Cerambycidae
- Genus: Notomulciber
- Species: N. gressitti

Binomial name
- Notomulciber gressitti (Tippman, 1942)

Synonyms
- Kamikiria gressitti Tippman, 1942

Species of beetle

Notomulciber gressitti is a species of beetle in the family Cerambycidae. It was described by Tippman in 1942.
