= Metamulciber geometricus =

Scientific classification
- Kingdom: Animalia
- Phylum: Arthropoda
- Class: Insecta
- Order: Coleoptera
- Suborder: Polyphaga
- Infraorder: Cucujiformia
- Family: Cerambycidae
- Genus: Metamulciber
- Species: M. geometricus

Binomial name
- Metamulciber geometricus Breuning, 1940

Species of beetle

Metamulciber geometricus is a species of beetle in the family Cerambycidae. It was described by Stephan von Breuning.
