= Notomulciber decemmaculatus =

Scientific classification
- Kingdom: Animalia
- Phylum: Arthropoda
- Class: Insecta
- Order: Coleoptera
- Suborder: Polyphaga
- Infraorder: Cucujiformia
- Family: Cerambycidae
- Genus: Notomulciber
- Species: N. decemmaculatus

Binomial name
- Notomulciber decemmaculatus Breuning, 1942

Species of beetle

Notomulciber decemmaculatus is a species of beetle in the family Cerambycidae. It was described by Stephan von Breuning in 1942. It is known from India.
