= Bumetopia fornicata =

Scientific classification
- Kingdom: Animalia
- Phylum: Arthropoda
- Class: Insecta
- Order: Coleoptera
- Suborder: Polyphaga
- Infraorder: Cucujiformia
- Family: Cerambycidae
- Genus: Bumetopia
- Species: B. fornicata

Binomial name
- Bumetopia fornicata (Newman, 1842)

Synonyms
- Heteroclytomorpha davaoana Heller, 1921; Homonoea fornicata Newman, 1842

Species of beetle

Bumetopia fornicata is a species of beetle in the family Cerambycidae. It was described by Newman in 1842. It is known from the Philippines.
