= Catapausa =

Scientific classification
- Domain: Eukaryota
- Kingdom: Animalia
- Phylum: Arthropoda
- Class: Insecta
- Order: Coleoptera
- Suborder: Polyphaga
- Infraorder: Cucujiformia
- Family: Cerambycidae
- Tribe: Homonoeini
- Genus: Catapausa

Genus of beetles

Catapausa is a genus of longhorn beetles of the subfamily Lamiinae,

== Species ==
It containing the following species:

- Catapausa albaria Heller, 1926
- Catapausa basimaculata Breuning, 1940
- Catapausa bimaculipennis Breuning, 1956
- Catapausa bispinosa Aurivillius, 1908
- Catapausa inermis Aurivillius, 1920
- Catapausa sulcatipennis Breuning, 1950
