= Bumetopia yagii =

Scientific classification
- Kingdom: Animalia
- Phylum: Arthropoda
- Class: Insecta
- Order: Coleoptera
- Suborder: Polyphaga
- Infraorder: Cucujiformia
- Family: Cerambycidae
- Genus: Bumetopia
- Species: B. yagii

Binomial name
- Bumetopia yagii Hayashi, 1994

Species of beetle

Bumetopia yagii is a species of beetle in the family Cerambycidae. It was described by Masao Hayashi in 1994.
