= Homonoea rotundipennis =

Scientific classification
- Kingdom: Animalia
- Phylum: Arthropoda
- Class: Insecta
- Order: Coleoptera
- Suborder: Polyphaga
- Infraorder: Cucujiformia
- Family: Cerambycidae
- Genus: Homonoea
- Species: H. rotundipennis

Binomial name
- Homonoea rotundipennis Breuning, 1950

Species of beetle

Homonoea rotundipennis is a species of beetle in the family Cerambycidae. It was described by Stephan von Breuning in 1950. It is known from the Philippines.
