= Notomulciber biguttatus =

Scientific classification
- Kingdom: Animalia
- Phylum: Arthropoda
- Class: Insecta
- Order: Coleoptera
- Suborder: Polyphaga
- Infraorder: Cucujiformia
- Family: Cerambycidae
- Genus: Notomulciber
- Species: N. biguttatus

Binomial name
- Notomulciber biguttatus (Pascoe, 1867)

Synonyms
- Micromulciber biguttatus (Pascoe, 1867); Mulciber biguttatus Pascoe, 1867

Species of beetle

Notomulciber biguttatus is a species of beetle in the family Cerambycidae. It was described by Francis Polkinghorne Pascoe in 1867. It is known from Borneo and Malaysia.
