= Mulciber strandi =

Scientific classification
- Kingdom: Animalia
- Phylum: Arthropoda
- Class: Insecta
- Order: Coleoptera
- Suborder: Polyphaga
- Infraorder: Cucujiformia
- Family: Cerambycidae
- Genus: Mulciber
- Species: M. strandi

Binomial name
- Mulciber strandi Breuning, 1939

Species of beetle

Mulciber strandi is a species of beetle in the family Cerambycidae. It was described by Stephan von Breuning in 1939.

It's 23 mm long and 7 mm wide, and its type locality is New Hannover. It was named in honor of Embrik Strand, in whose Festschrift the species description was written.
