= Bumetopia sexpunctata =

Scientific classification
- Kingdom: Animalia
- Phylum: Arthropoda
- Class: Insecta
- Order: Coleoptera
- Suborder: Polyphaga
- Infraorder: Cucujiformia
- Family: Cerambycidae
- Genus: Bumetopia
- Species: B. sexpunctata

Binomial name
- Bumetopia sexpunctata Breuning & de Jong, 1941

Species of beetle

Bumetopia sexpunctata is a species of beetle in the family Cerambycidae. It was described by Stephan von Breuning and de Jong in 1941. It is known from the Philippines.
