= Bumetopia vittipennis =

Scientific classification
- Kingdom: Animalia
- Phylum: Arthropoda
- Class: Insecta
- Order: Coleoptera
- Suborder: Polyphaga
- Infraorder: Cucujiformia
- Family: Cerambycidae
- Genus: Bumetopia
- Species: B. vittipennis

Binomial name
- Bumetopia vittipennis Breuning, 1970

Species of beetle

Bumetopia vittipennis is a species of beetle in the family Cerambycidae. It was described by Stephan von Breuning in 1970. It is known from the Philippines.
