= Notomulciber =

Scientific classification
- Kingdom: Animalia
- Phylum: Arthropoda
- Class: Insecta
- Order: Coleoptera
- Suborder: Polyphaga
- Infraorder: Cucujiformia
- Family: Cerambycidae
- Subfamily: Lamiinae
- Tribe: Homonoeini
- Genus: Notomulciber; Blackburn, 1894

Genus of beetles

Notomulciber is a genus of longhorn beetles of the subfamily Lamiinae, containing the following species:

subgenus Micromulciber

- Notomulciber albosetosus Heller, 1923
- Notomulciber basimaculatus (Breuning & de Jong, 1941)
- Notomulciber biguttatus (Pascoe, 1867)
- Notomulciber bryanti (Breuning, 1939)
- Notomulciber decemmaculatus Breuning, 1942
- Notomulciber enganensis (Breuning, 1939)
- Notomulciber flavolineatus Breuning, 1947
- Notomulciber fuscomarginatus (Aurivillius, 1914)
- Notomulciber gressitti (Tippmann, 1955)
- Notomulciber javanicus (Breuning, 1956)
- Notomulciber notatus (Fisher, 1936)
- Notomulciber ochraceomaculatus (Breuning, 1939)
- Notomulciber ochreosignatus (Heller, 1921)
- Notomulciber palawanicus Breuning & de Jong, 1941
- Notomulciber quadrimaculatus Breuning & De Jong, 1941
- Notomulciber quadrisignatus (Schwarzer, 1925)
- Notomulciber sabahanus Vives & Heffern, 2016
- Notomulciber sexlineatus (Breuning, 1959)
- Notomulciber sexnotatus Breuning & de Jong, 1941
- Notomulciber strandi (Breuning, 1939)
- Notomulciber sumatrensis (Schwarzer, 1930)
- Notomulciber travancorensis (Breuning, 1958)
- Notomulciber trimaculatus (Breuning, 1939)
- Notomulciber variegatus (Aurivillius, 1914)
- Notomulciber viraktamathi Hiremath, 2018

subgenus Notomulciber

- Notomulciber carpentariae Blackburn, 1894
- Notomulciber celebensis Breuning, 1961
