= Metopivaria =

Scientific classification
- Kingdom: Animalia
- Phylum: Arthropoda
- Class: Insecta
- Order: Coleoptera
- Suborder: Polyphaga
- Infraorder: Cucujiformia
- Family: Cerambycidae
- Tribe: Homonoeini
- Genus: Metopivaria

Genus of beetles

Metopivaria is a genus of longhorn beetles of the subfamily Lamiinae, containing the following species:

- Metopivaria brunnea (Aurivillius, 1923)
- Metopivaria elongata (Breuning, 1976)
