= Bumetopia japonica =

Scientific classification
- Kingdom: Animalia
- Phylum: Arthropoda
- Class: Insecta
- Order: Coleoptera
- Suborder: Polyphaga
- Infraorder: Cucujiformia
- Family: Cerambycidae
- Genus: Bumetopia
- Species: B. japonica

Binomial name
- Bumetopia japonica (Thomson, 1868)

Synonyms
- Bumetopia oscitans var. variegata Matsushita, 1933; Yochostyla japonica Thomson, 1868

Species of beetle

Bumetopia japonica is a species of beetle in the family Cerambycidae. It was described by Thomson in 1868.

== Subspecies ==
- Bumetopia japonica japonica (Thomson, 1868)
- Bumetopia japonica okinawana Hayashi, 1963
