= Bumetopia conspersa =

Scientific classification
- Kingdom: Animalia
- Phylum: Arthropoda
- Class: Insecta
- Order: Coleoptera
- Suborder: Polyphaga
- Infraorder: Cucujiformia
- Family: Cerambycidae
- Genus: Bumetopia
- Species: B. conspersa

Binomial name
- Bumetopia conspersa (Aurivillius, 1924)

Synonyms
- Brachyhomonoea conspersa Aurivillius, 1924

Species of beetle

Bumetopia conspersa is a species of beetle in the family Cerambycidae. It was described by Per Olof Christopher Aurivillius in 1924 and is known from the Philippines.
