= Notomulciber quadrimaculatus =

Scientific classification
- Kingdom: Animalia
- Phylum: Arthropoda
- Class: Insecta
- Order: Coleoptera
- Suborder: Polyphaga
- Infraorder: Cucujiformia
- Family: Cerambycidae
- Genus: Notomulciber
- Species: N. quadrimaculatus

Binomial name
- Notomulciber quadrimaculatus Breuning & de Jong, 1941

Synonyms
- Micromulciber quadrimaculatus (Breuning & De Jong, 1941)

Species of beetle

Notomulciber quadrimaculatus is a species of beetle in the family Cerambycidae. It was described by Stephan von Breuning and de Jong in 1941. It is known from Borneo.
