= Xestiodion similis =

Scientific classification
- Kingdom: Animalia
- Phylum: Arthropoda
- Class: Insecta
- Order: Coleoptera
- Suborder: Polyphaga
- Infraorder: Cucujiformia
- Family: Cerambycidae
- Subfamily: Cerambycinae
- Tribe: Cerambycini
- Genus: Xestiodion
- Species: X. similis

Binomial name
- Xestiodion similis (Melzer, 1920)

Synonyms
- Coleoxestia similis Zikán & Wygodzinsky, 1948

Species of beetle

Xestiodion similis is a species in the longhorn beetle family Cerambycidae. It is found in Brazil.
