= Heteroclytomorpha simplex =

Scientific classification
- Kingdom: Animalia
- Phylum: Arthropoda
- Class: Insecta
- Order: Coleoptera
- Suborder: Polyphaga
- Infraorder: Cucujiformia
- Family: Cerambycidae
- Genus: Heteroclytomorpha
- Species: H. simplex

Binomial name
- Heteroclytomorpha simplex Lacordaire, 1872

Species of beetle

Heteroclytomorpha simplex is a species of beetle in the family Cerambycidae. It was described by Lacordaire in 1872.
