= Anapausa armata =

Scientific classification
- Kingdom: Animalia
- Phylum: Arthropoda
- Class: Insecta
- Order: Coleoptera
- Suborder: Polyphaga
- Infraorder: Cucujiformia
- Family: Cerambycidae
- Genus: Anapausa
- Species: A. armata

Binomial name
- Anapausa armata Thomson, 1864

Species of beetle

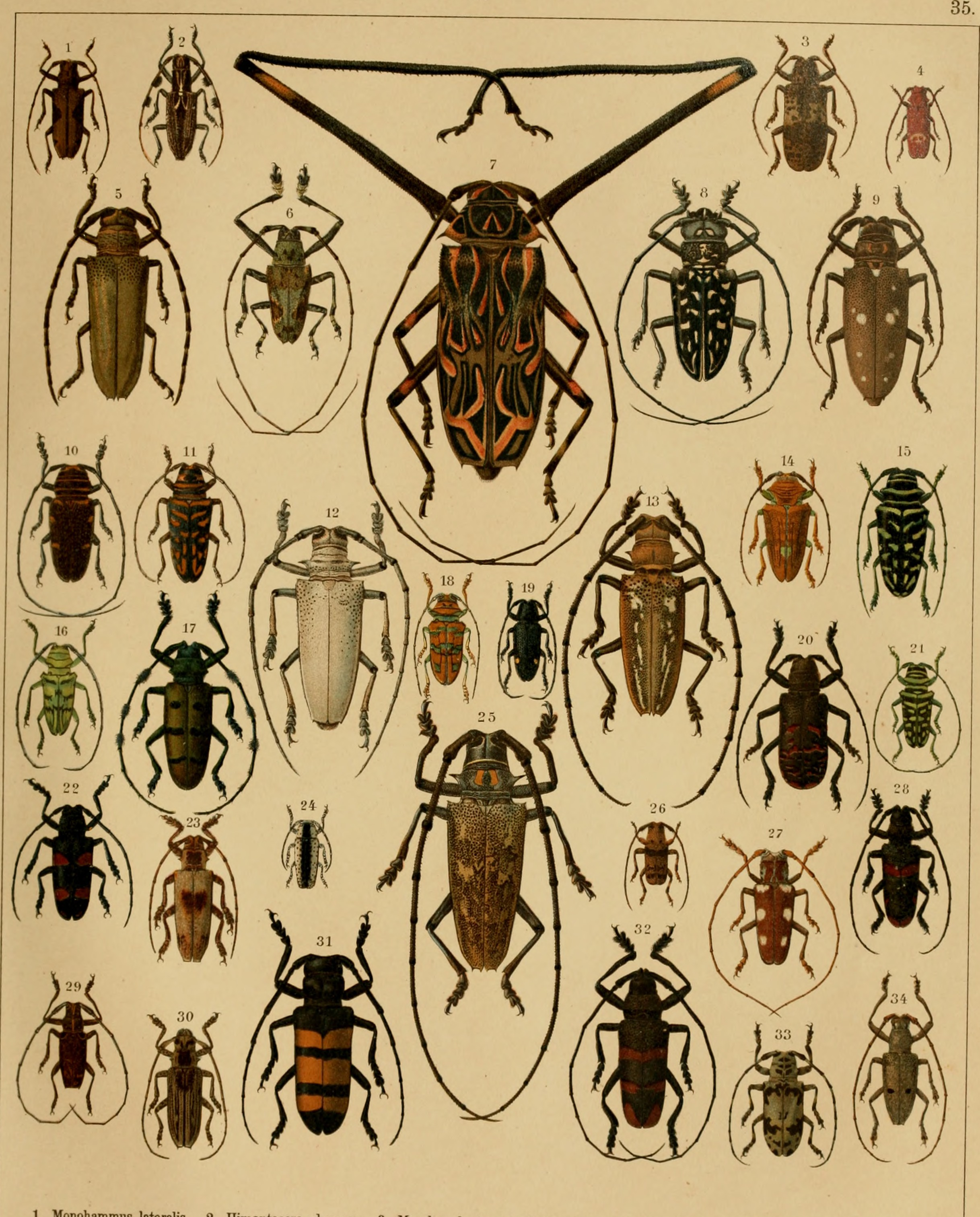
Cerambycidae beetles; Anapausa armata is #30 in the lower left corner

Anapausa armata is a species of beetle in the family Cerambycidae. It was described by James Thomson in 1864. It is known from Papua New Guinea.
