= Notomulciber bryanti =

Scientific classification
- Kingdom: Animalia
- Phylum: Arthropoda
- Class: Insecta
- Order: Coleoptera
- Suborder: Polyphaga
- Infraorder: Cucujiformia
- Family: Cerambycidae
- Genus: Notomulciber
- Species: N. bryanti

Binomial name
- Notomulciber bryanti (Breuning, 1939)

Synonyms
- Micromulciber bryanti Breuning, 1939

Species of beetle

Notomulciber bryanti is a species of beetle in the family Cerambycidae. It was described by Stephan von Breuning in 1939. It is known from Sri Lanka.

It is 12–14 mm long and 3.6–4 mm wide, and its type locality is Kandy, Sri Lanka. It was named in honor of British entomologist Gilbert Ernest Bryant (1878–1965).
