= Anapausa longipennis =

Scientific classification
- Kingdom: Animalia
- Phylum: Arthropoda
- Class: Insecta
- Order: Coleoptera
- Suborder: Polyphaga
- Infraorder: Cucujiformia
- Family: Cerambycidae
- Genus: Anapausa
- Species: A. longipennis

Binomial name
- Anapausa longipennis Breuning, 1966

Species of beetle

Anapausa longipennis is a species of beetle in the family Cerambycidae. It was described by Stephan von Breuning in 1966. It is known from New Guinea.
