= Notomulciber palawanicus =

Scientific classification
- Kingdom: Animalia
- Phylum: Arthropoda
- Class: Insecta
- Order: Coleoptera
- Suborder: Polyphaga
- Infraorder: Cucujiformia
- Family: Cerambycidae
- Genus: Notomulciber
- Species: N. palawanicus

Binomial name
- Notomulciber palawanicus Breuning & de Jong, 1941

Species of beetle

Notomulciber palawanicus is a species of beetle in the family Cerambycidae. It was described by Stephan von Breuning and de Jong in 1941. It is known from the Philippines.
