= Notomulciber sexlineatus =

Scientific classification
- Kingdom: Animalia
- Phylum: Arthropoda
- Class: Insecta
- Order: Coleoptera
- Suborder: Polyphaga
- Infraorder: Cucujiformia
- Family: Cerambycidae
- Genus: Notomulciber
- Species: N. sexlineatus

Binomial name
- Notomulciber sexlineatus Breuning, 1959

Species of beetle

Notomulciber sexlineatus is a species of beetle in the family Cerambycidae. It was described by Stephan von Breuning in 1959.
