= Xestiodion annulipes =

Scientific classification
- Kingdom: Animalia
- Phylum: Arthropoda
- Class: Insecta
- Order: Coleoptera
- Suborder: Polyphaga
- Infraorder: Cucujiformia
- Family: Cerambycidae
- Subfamily: Cerambycinae
- Tribe: Cerambycini
- Genus: Xestiodion
- Species: X. annulipes

Binomial name
- Xestiodion annulipes (Buquet, 1844)

Synonyms
- Coleoxestia annulipes Zajciw, 1972; Criodion annulipes Buquet, 1844; Xestia annulipes Gahan, 1892

Species of beetle

Xestiodion annulipes is a species in the longhorn beetle family Cerambycidae. It is found in Brazil, Paraguay, and Bolivia.
