= Heteroclytomorpha punctata =

Scientific classification
- Kingdom: Animalia
- Phylum: Arthropoda
- Class: Insecta
- Order: Coleoptera
- Suborder: Polyphaga
- Infraorder: Cucujiformia
- Family: Cerambycidae
- Genus: Heteroclytomorpha
- Species: H. punctata

Binomial name
- Heteroclytomorpha punctata Gahan, 1888

Species of beetle

Heteroclytomorpha punctata is a species of beetle in the family Cerambycidae. It was described by Charles Joseph Gahan in 1888. It is known from the Solomon Islands.
