= Bumetopia flavovariegata =

Scientific classification
- Kingdom: Animalia
- Phylum: Arthropoda
- Class: Insecta
- Order: Coleoptera
- Suborder: Polyphaga
- Infraorder: Cucujiformia
- Family: Cerambycidae
- Genus: Bumetopia
- Species: B. flavovariegata

Binomial name
- Bumetopia flavovariegata (Aurivillius, 1911)

Species of beetle

Bumetopia flavovariegata is a species of beetle in the family Cerambycidae. It was described by Per Olof Christopher Aurivillius in 1911.

== Subspecies ==
- Bumetopia flavovariegata flavovariegata (Aurivillius, 1911)
- Bumetopia flavovariegata javanica Breuning, 1958
