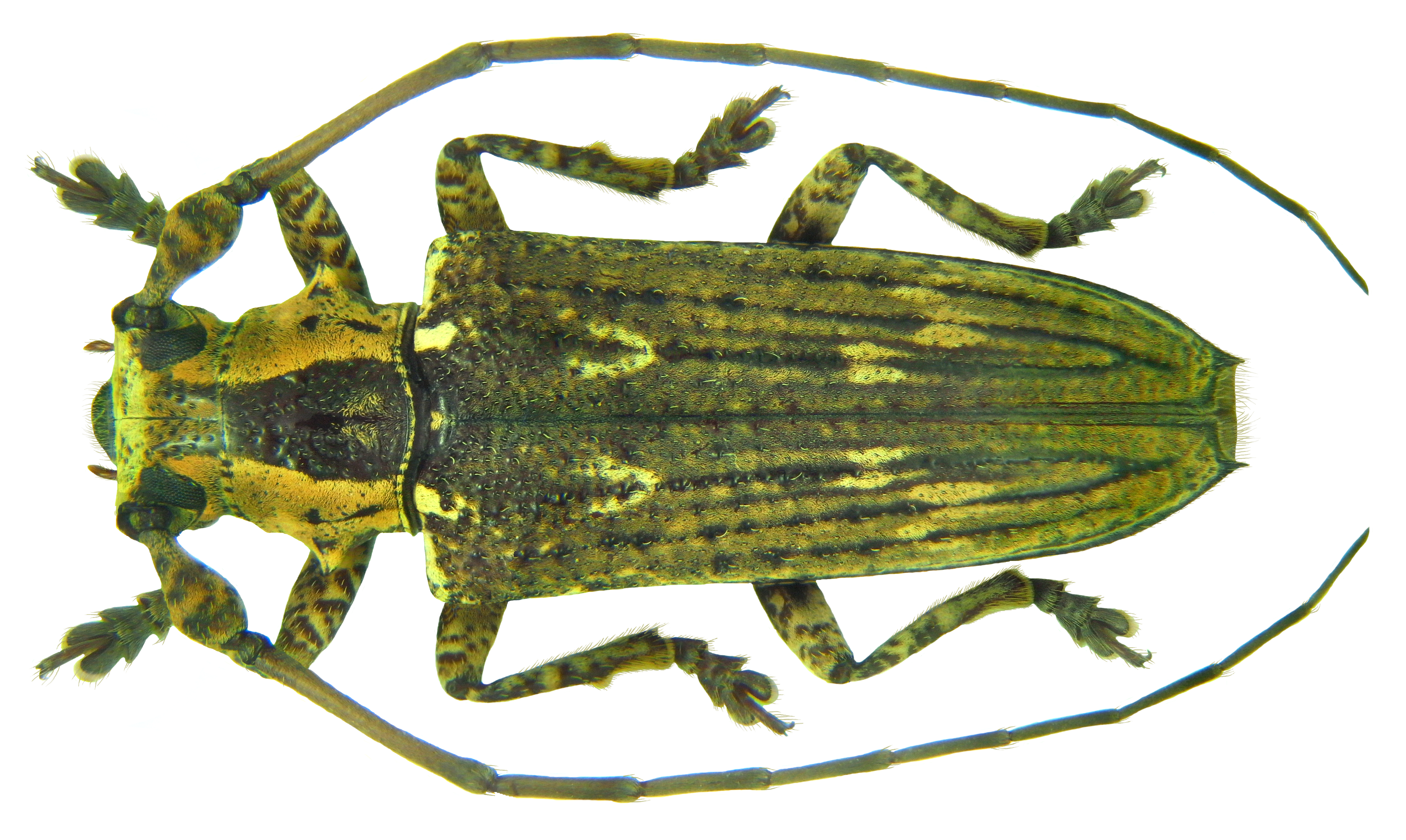
- Mulciber undulatoides female

Scientific classification
- Domain: Eukaryota
- Kingdom: Animalia
- Phylum: Arthropoda
- Class: Insecta
- Order: Coleoptera
- Suborder: Polyphaga
- Infraorder: Cucujiformia
- Family: Cerambycidae
- Subfamily: Lamiinae
- Tribe: Homonoeini
- Genus: Mulciber; Thomson, 1864

Type species
- Mulciber linnei Thomson, 1864

Species
- See text

= Mulciber (beetle) =

Genus of beetles

Mulciber is a genus of longhorn beetles of the subfamily Lamiinae, containing the following species:

== Species ==
- Mulciber albosetosus Breuning, 1939
- Mulciber basimaculatus Breuning, 1939
- Mulciber devosi Voitsekhovskii, 2020
- Mulciber lineatus Aurivillius, 1920
- Mulciber linnei Thomson, 1864
- Mulciber maculosus Breuning, 1939
- Mulciber plagiatus Aurivillius, 1916
- Mulciber pullatus Pascoe, 1867
- Mulciber rosselli Breuning, 1970
- Mulciber rotundipennis Breuning, 1939
- Mulciber ruficornis Breuning, 1958
- Mulciber strandi Breuning, 1939
- Mulciber undulatoides Breuning, 1940
