= Grynex =

Scientific classification
- Kingdom: Animalia
- Phylum: Arthropoda
- Class: Insecta
- Order: Coleoptera
- Suborder: Polyphaga
- Infraorder: Cucujiformia
- Family: Cerambycidae
- Tribe: Homonoeini
- Genus: Grynex

Genus of beetles

Grynex is a genus of longhorn beetles of the subfamily Lamiinae, containing the following species:

- Grynex lineatus Pascoe, 1888
- Grynex martini (Allard, 1894)
- Grynex spinosus Breuning, 1939
