= Bumetopia elongata =

Scientific classification
- Kingdom: Animalia
- Phylum: Arthropoda
- Class: Insecta
- Order: Coleoptera
- Suborder: Polyphaga
- Infraorder: Cucujiformia
- Family: Cerambycidae
- Genus: Bumetopia
- Species: B. elongata

Binomial name
- Bumetopia elongata Breuning, 1972

Species of beetle

Bumetopia elongata is a species of beetle in the family Cerambycidae. It was described by Stephan von Breuning in 1972. It is known from the Philippines.
