= Catapausa inermis =

Scientific classification
- Domain: Eukaryota
- Kingdom: Animalia
- Phylum: Arthropoda
- Class: Insecta
- Order: Coleoptera
- Suborder: Polyphaga
- Infraorder: Cucujiformia
- Family: Cerambycidae
- Genus: Catapausa
- Species: C. inermis

Binomial name
- Catapausa inermis Aurivillius, 1920

Species of beetle

Catapausa inermis is a species of beetle in the family Cerambycidae. It was described by Per Olof Christopher Aurivillius in 1920 and is known from Papua New Guinea.
