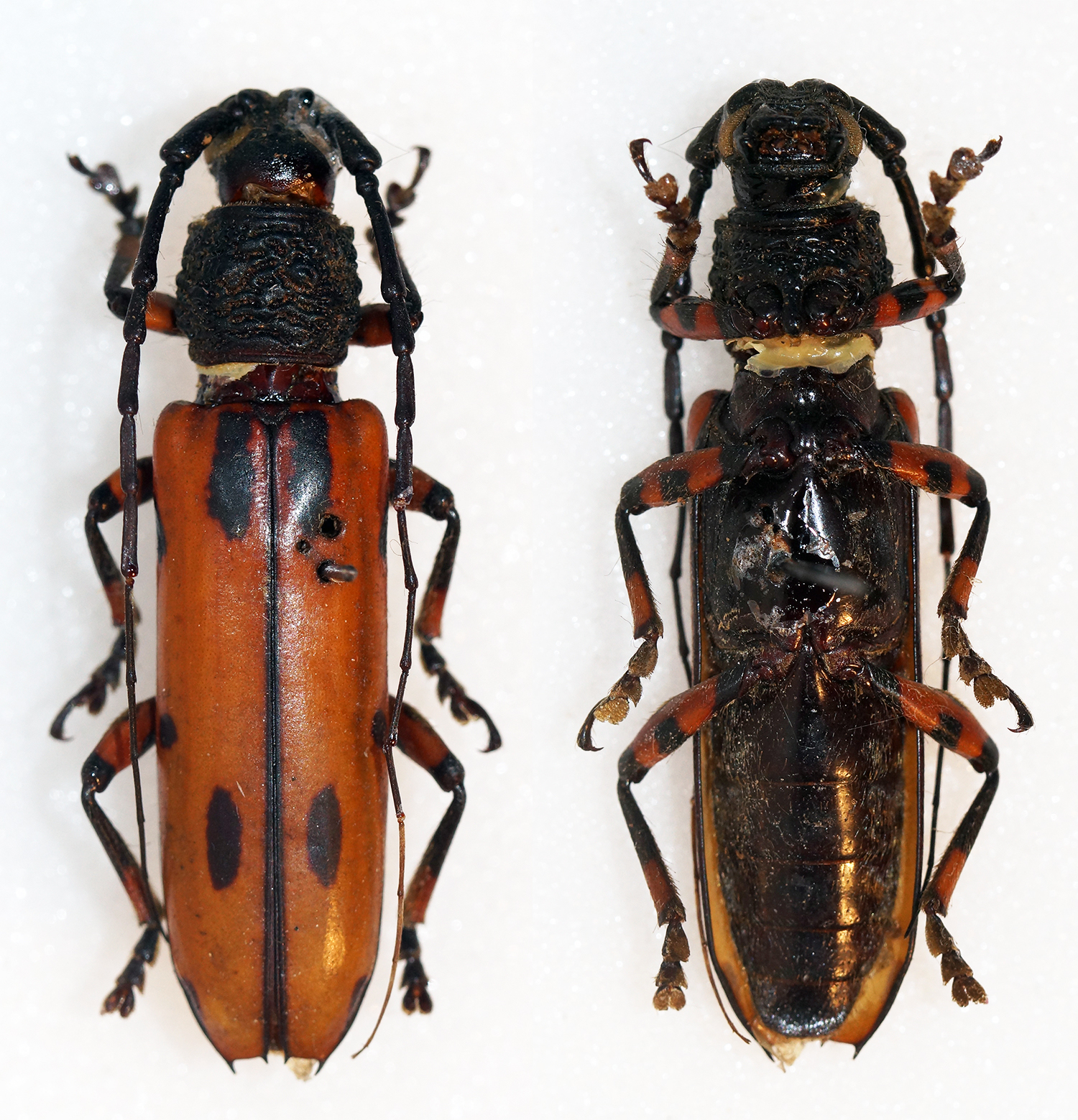
- Xestiodion pictipes

Scientific classification
- Kingdom: Animalia
- Phylum: Arthropoda
- Class: Insecta
- Order: Coleoptera
- Suborder: Polyphaga
- Infraorder: Cucujiformia
- Family: Cerambycidae
- Tribe: Cerambycini
- Genus: Xestiodion; Fragoso, 1981

Species
- See text

= Xestiodion =

Genus of beetles

Xestiodion is a genus of beetles in the family Cerambycidae, containing the following species:

- Xestiodion annulipes (Buquet, 1844) (Brazil, Paraguay, and Bolivia)
- Xestiodion pictipes (Newman, 1838) (Brazil and French Guiana)
- Xestiodion similis (Melzer, 1920) (Brazil)
