= Heteroclytomorpha singularis =

Scientific classification
- Kingdom: Animalia
- Phylum: Arthropoda
- Class: Insecta
- Order: Coleoptera
- Suborder: Polyphaga
- Infraorder: Cucujiformia
- Family: Cerambycidae
- Genus: Heteroclytomorpha
- Species: H. singularis

Binomial name
- Heteroclytomorpha singularis Breuning, 1950

Species of beetle

Heteroclytomorpha singularis is a species of beetle in the family Cerambycidae. It was described by Stephan von Breuning in 1950 and is known from Fiji.
