= Homonoea boudanti =

Scientific classification
- Kingdom: Animalia
- Phylum: Arthropoda
- Class: Insecta
- Order: Coleoptera
- Suborder: Polyphaga
- Infraorder: Cucujiformia
- Family: Cerambycidae
- Genus: Homonoea
- Species: H. boudanti

Binomial name
- Homonoea boudanti Hüdepohl, 1995

Species of beetle

Homonoea boudanti is a species of beetle in the family Cerambycidae. It was described by Karl-Ernst Hüdepohl in 1995. It is known from the Philippines.
