= Notomulciber ochreosignatus =

Scientific classification
- Kingdom: Animalia
- Phylum: Arthropoda
- Class: Insecta
- Order: Coleoptera
- Suborder: Polyphaga
- Infraorder: Cucujiformia
- Family: Cerambycidae
- Genus: Notomulciber
- Species: N. ochreosignatus

Binomial name
- Notomulciber ochreosignatus (Heller, 1921)

Synonyms
- Micromulciber ochreosignatus Heller, 1921

Species of beetle

Notomulciber ochreosignatus is a species of beetle in the family Cerambycidae. It was described by Heller in 1921. It is known from Philippines.
