= Notomulciber basimaculatus =

Scientific classification
- Kingdom: Animalia
- Phylum: Arthropoda
- Class: Insecta
- Order: Coleoptera
- Suborder: Polyphaga
- Infraorder: Cucujiformia
- Family: Cerambycidae
- Genus: Notomulciber
- Species: N. basimaculatus

Binomial name
- Notomulciber basimaculatus (Breuning & de Jong, 1941)

Synonyms
- Micromulciber basimaculatus (Breuning & de Jong, 1941)

Species of beetle

Notomulciber basimaculatus is a species of beetle in the family Cerambycidae. It was described by Stephan von Breuning and de Jong in 1941. It is known from Sumatra.
