= Filipinmulciber =

Scientific classification
- Kingdom: Animalia
- Phylum: Arthropoda
- Class: Insecta
- Order: Coleoptera
- Suborder: Polyphaga
- Infraorder: Cucujiformia
- Family: Cerambycidae
- Genus: Filipinmulciber
- Species: F. breuningi

Binomial name
- Filipinmulciber breuningi Vives, 2009

Genus of beetles

Filipinmulciber breuningi is a species of beetle in the family Cerambycidae, and the only species in the genus Filipinmulciber. It was described by Vives in 2009.
