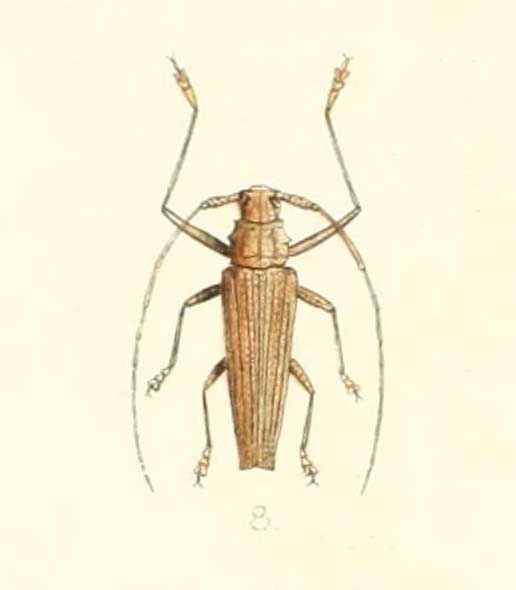

Scientific classification
- Kingdom: Animalia
- Phylum: Arthropoda
- Class: Insecta
- Order: Coleoptera
- Suborder: Polyphaga
- Infraorder: Cucujiformia
- Family: Cerambycidae
- Genus: Homonoea
- Species: H. uniformis

Binomial name
- Homonoea uniformis Jordan, 1894

= Homonoea uniformis =

Species of beetle

Homonoea uniformis is a species of beetle in the family Cerambycidae. It was described by Karl Jordan in 1894. It is known from Sanghir, Indonesia and Borneo.
