= Caroliniella =

Scientific classification
- Kingdom: Animalia
- Phylum: Arthropoda
- Class: Insecta
- Order: Coleoptera
- Suborder: Polyphaga
- Infraorder: Cucujiformia
- Family: Cerambycidae
- Genus: Caroliniella
- Species: C. aenescens

Binomial name
- Caroliniella aenescens Blair, 1940

Genus of beetles

Caroliniella aenescens is a species of beetle in the family Cerambycidae, and the only species in the genus Caroliniella. It was described by Blair in 1940.

Note: there appears to be a conflict with the bush cricket named Caroliniella Cadena-Castañeda, 2015 in the tribe Scudderiini.
