= Sormea =

Scientific classification
- Kingdom: Animalia
- Phylum: Arthropoda
- Clade: Pancrustacea
- Class: Insecta
- Order: Coleoptera
- Suborder: Polyphaga
- Infraorder: Cucujiformia
- Family: Cerambycidae
- Genus: Sormea
- Species: S. orbignyi

Binomial name
- Sormea orbignyi (Guérin-Méneville, 1831)

Genus of beetles

Sormea orbignyi is a species of beetle in the family Cerambycidae, and the only species in the genus Sormea. It was described by Félix Édouard Guérin-Méneville in 1831.
