= Pseudomulciber =

Scientific classification
- Kingdom: Animalia
- Phylum: Arthropoda
- Class: Insecta
- Order: Coleoptera
- Suborder: Polyphaga
- Infraorder: Cucujiformia
- Family: Cerambycidae
- Genus: Pseudomulciber
- Species: P. salomonum

Binomial name
- Pseudomulciber salomonum Breuning, 1961

Genus of beetles

Pseudomulciber salomonum is a species of beetle in the family Cerambycidae, and the only species in the genus Pseudomulciber. It was described by Breuning in 1961.
