= Heteroclytomorpha =

Scientific classification
- Kingdom: Animalia
- Phylum: Arthropoda
- Class: Insecta
- Order: Coleoptera
- Suborder: Polyphaga
- Infraorder: Cucujiformia
- Family: Cerambycidae
- Subfamily: Lamiinae
- Tribe: Homonoeini
- Genus: Heteroclytomorpha; Blanchard, 1853

Genus of beetles

Heteroclytomorpha is a genus of longhorn beetles of the subfamily Lamiinae, containing the following species:

- Heteroclytomorpha inaequalis Aurivillius, 1908
- Heteroclytomorpha punctata Gahan, 1888
- Heteroclytomorpha quadrinotata Blanchard, 1853
- Heteroclytomorpha sexplagiata Breuning, 1939
- Heteroclytomorpha simplex Lacordaire, 1872
- Heteroclytomorpha singularis Breuning, 1950
- Heteroclytomorpha sormeoides Aurivillius, 1908
