= Anapausoides =

Scientific classification
- Kingdom: Animalia
- Phylum: Arthropoda
- Class: Insecta
- Order: Coleoptera
- Suborder: Polyphaga
- Infraorder: Cucujiformia
- Family: Cerambycidae
- Genus: Anapausoides
- Species: A. longula

Binomial name
- Anapausoides longula Breuning, 1973

Genus of beetles

Anapausoides longula is a species of beetle in the family Cerambycidae, and the only species in the genus Anapausoides. It was described by Breuning in 1973.
