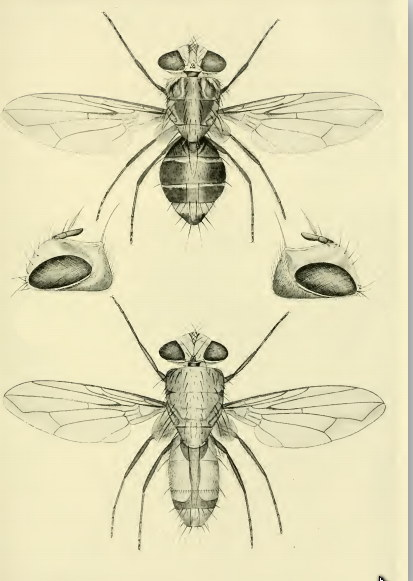
- Heterometopia argentea, top: male fly; below; female fly

Scientific classification
- Kingdom: Animalia
- Phylum: Arthropoda
- Class: Insecta
- Order: Diptera
- Family: Tachinidae
- Subfamily: Dexiinae
- Tribe: Dexiini
- Genus: Heterometopia; Macquart, 1846

Type species
- Heterometopia argentea Macquart, 1846

Synonyms
- Cystometopia Townsend, 1926

= Heterometopia =

Genus of flies

Heterometopia is a genus of flies in the family Tachinidae.

== Species ==
- Heterometopia argentea Macquart, 1846
- Heterometopia bella Paramonov, 1960
- Heterometopia montana Paramonov, 1960
- Heterometopia nigra Barraclough, 1992
