= Edward Newman (entomologist) =

English entomologist, botanist and writer

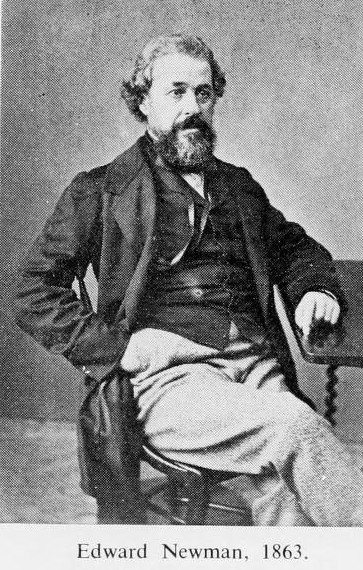
- Newman in 1863
- Born: 13 May 1801
- Died: 12 June 1876 (aged 75)
- Scientific career
- Author abbrev. (botany): Newman
- Author abbrev. (zoology): Newman

Edward Newman (13 May 1801 – 12 June 1876) was an English entomologist, botanist and writer.

Newman was born in Hampstead into a Quaker family. Both his parents were keen naturalists, and he was further encouraged to take an interest in the natural world at his boarding school in Painswick. He left school at sixteen to join his father's business in Guildford, moving to Deptford in 1826 to take over a rope-making business. Here he met many of the leading entomologists of the day, including Edward Doubleday, and was a founder member of the Entomological Club. In 1832 he was elected as editor of the club's journal, The Entomological Magazine, and the following year became a fellow of the Linnean Society and one of the founder members of the Entomological Society of London.

In 1840 Newman was married and published the first edition of A History of British Ferns and Allied Plants. He became a partner in a firm of London printers, Luxford & Co., and became a printer and publisher of books on natural history and science. He later became the natural history editor of The Field, editor of The Zoologist and editor of The Entomologist. His books included Birds-nesting (1861), New Edition of Montagu's Ornithological Dictionary (1866), Illustrated Natural History of British Moths (1869) and Illustrated Natural History of British Butterflies (1871). He was also author of The letters of Rusticus on the natural history of Godalming. Extracted from the Magazine of natural history, the Entomological magazine, and the Entomologist (1849). The topic of these "letters" is economic entomology, some were published in Chamber's Journal.

Newman's Attempted division of British Insects into natural orders. The Entomological Magazine 2: 379-431(1834) establishes many new families and is therefore an important work of scientific classification.

Newman viewed the skeletons of Pterosaurs not as reptiles but as marsupial bats. This was based on earlier suggestions that some pterosaur fossils showed tufts of hair, which suggested they could not be typical cold blooded reptiles. As a result, he published a reconstruction of pterosaurs as hairy animals in an 1843 edition of the Zoologist. This is, as far as is known, the first reconstruction of pterosaurs as hairy warm blooded creatures. They are now thought to be highly evolved and warm blooded reptiles and not marsupial bats. New argued that it was rather unlikely that his ideas were correct, since authorities like Georges Cuvier and William Buckland thought pterosaurs were reptiles, but, even so, it was still possible that the experts were wrong.
