= Poeciloxestia plagiata =

Scientific classification
- Kingdom: Animalia
- Phylum: Arthropoda
- Class: Insecta
- Order: Coleoptera
- Suborder: Polyphaga
- Infraorder: Cucujiformia
- Family: Cerambycidae
- Subfamily: Cerambycinae
- Tribe: Cerambycini
- Genus: Poeciloxestia
- Species: P. plagiata

Binomial name
- Poeciloxestia plagiata (Waterhouse, 1880)

Synonyms
- Criodion plagiatum Blackwelder, 1946

Species of beetle

Poeciloxestia plagiata is a species in the longhorn beetle family Cerambycidae. It is found in Ecuador.
