= Poeciloxestia paraensis =

Scientific classification
- Kingdom: Animalia
- Phylum: Arthropoda
- Class: Insecta
- Order: Coleoptera
- Suborder: Polyphaga
- Infraorder: Cucujiformia
- Family: Cerambycidae
- Subfamily: Cerambycinae
- Tribe: Cerambycini
- Genus: Poeciloxestia
- Species: P. paraensis

Binomial name
- Poeciloxestia paraensis Lane, 1965

Species of beetle

Poeciloxestia paraensis is a species in the longhorn beetle family Cerambycidae. It is found in Brazil, Colombia, French Guiana, Trinidad & Tobago, and Venezuela.
