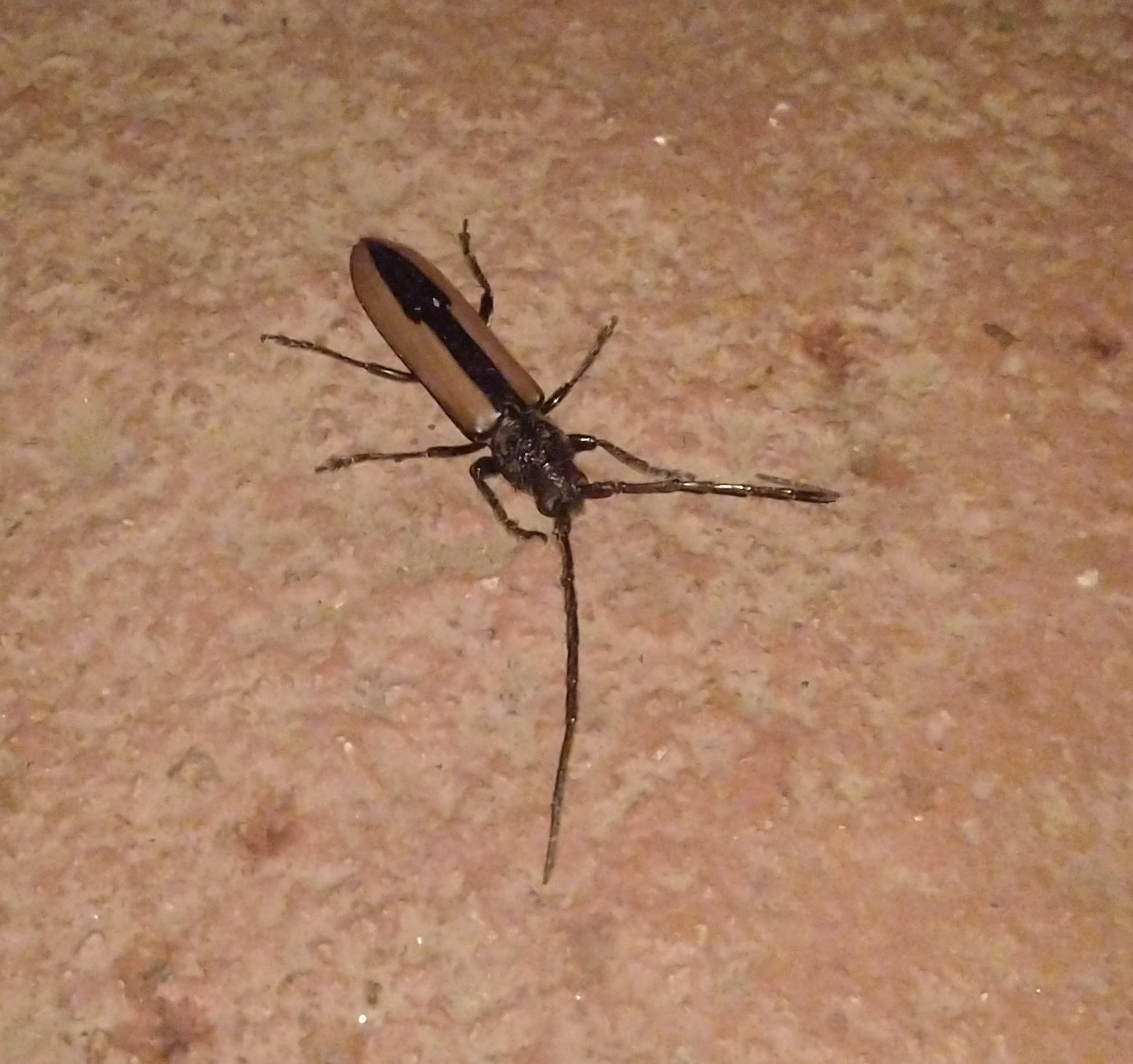
- Poeciloxestia elegans, Brasil

Scientific classification
- Domain: Eukaryota
- Kingdom: Animalia
- Phylum: Arthropoda
- Class: Insecta
- Order: Coleoptera
- Suborder: Polyphaga
- Infraorder: Cucujiformia
- Family: Cerambycidae
- Subfamily: Cerambycinae
- Tribe: Cerambycini
- Genus: Poeciloxestia
- Species: P. elegans

Binomial name
- Poeciloxestia elegans (Gory, 1833)

Synonyms
- Coleoxestia elegans Zikán & Zikán, 1944; Criodion elegans Thomson, 1861; Xestia elegans White, 1853

= Poeciloxestia elegans =

Species of beetle

Poeciloxestia elegans is a species in the longhorn beetle family Cerambycidae. It is found in Brazil.
