= Poeciloxestia sagittaria =

Scientific classification
- Kingdom: Animalia
- Phylum: Arthropoda
- Class: Insecta
- Order: Coleoptera
- Suborder: Polyphaga
- Infraorder: Cucujiformia
- Family: Cerambycidae
- Subfamily: Cerambycinae
- Tribe: Cerambycini
- Genus: Poeciloxestia
- Species: P. sagittaria

Binomial name
- Poeciloxestia sagittaria (Bates, 1872)

Synonyms
- Coleoxestia sagittaria Lane, 1965; Coloexestia sagittaria Franz, 1954; Xestia sagittaria Gemminger & Harold, 1872

Species of beetle

Poeciloxestia sagittaria is a species in the longhorn beetle family Cerambycidae. It is found in Bolivia, Brazil, Colombia, El Salvador, French Guiana, Mexico, Nicaragua, and Venezuela.
