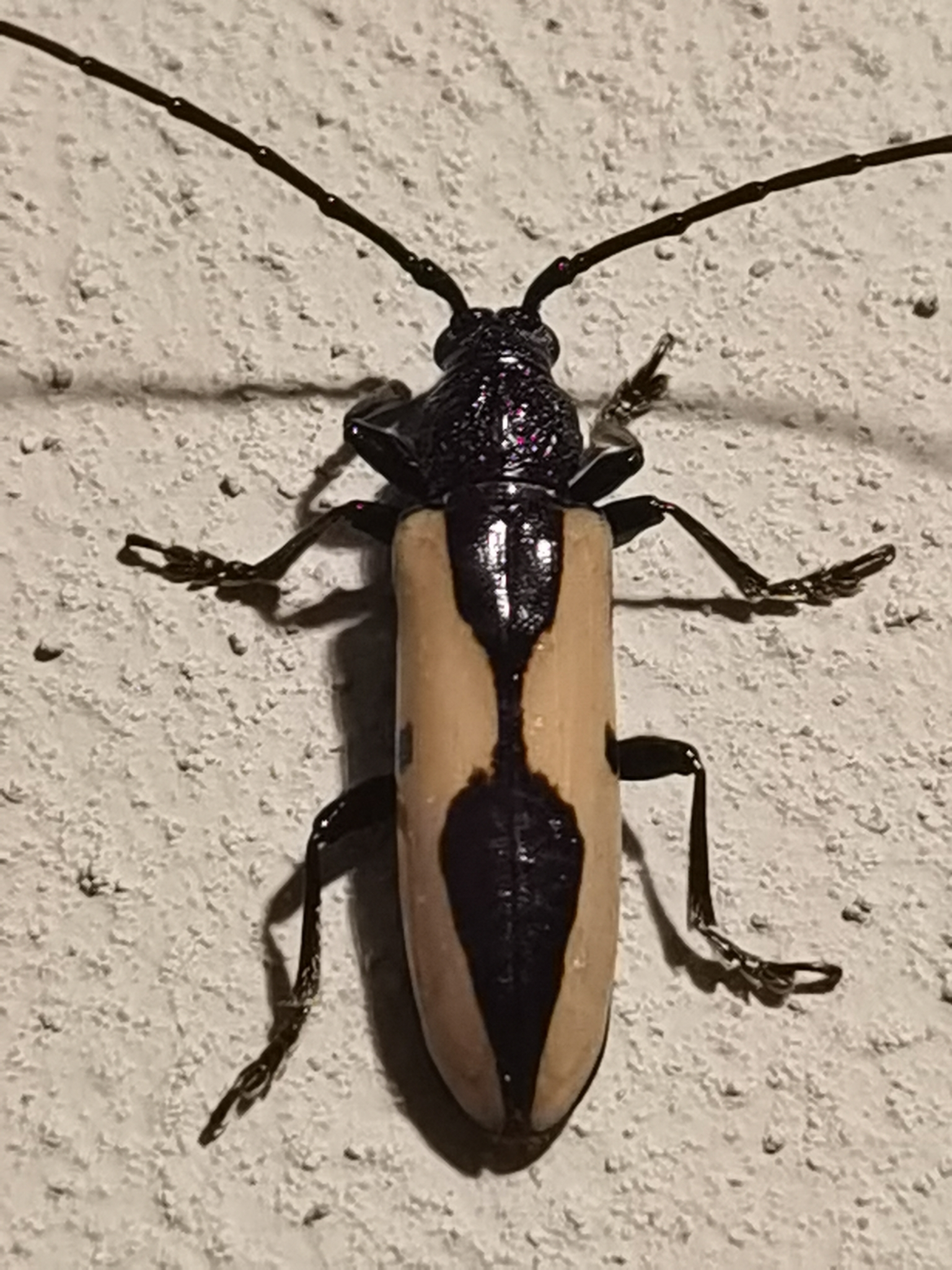
- Poeciloxestia lanceolata, Costa Rica

Scientific classification
- Kingdom: Animalia
- Phylum: Arthropoda
- Class: Insecta
- Order: Coleoptera
- Suborder: Polyphaga
- Infraorder: Cucujiformia
- Family: Cerambycidae
- Subfamily: Cerambycinae
- Tribe: Cerambycini
- Genus: Poeciloxestia
- Species: P. lanceolata

Binomial name
- Poeciloxestia lanceolata Fragoso, 1978

= Poeciloxestia lanceolata =

Species of beetle

Poeciloxestia lanceolata is a species in the longhorn beetle family Cerambycidae. It is found in Costa Rica, El Salvador, Honduras, Mexico, Brazil and Panama.
