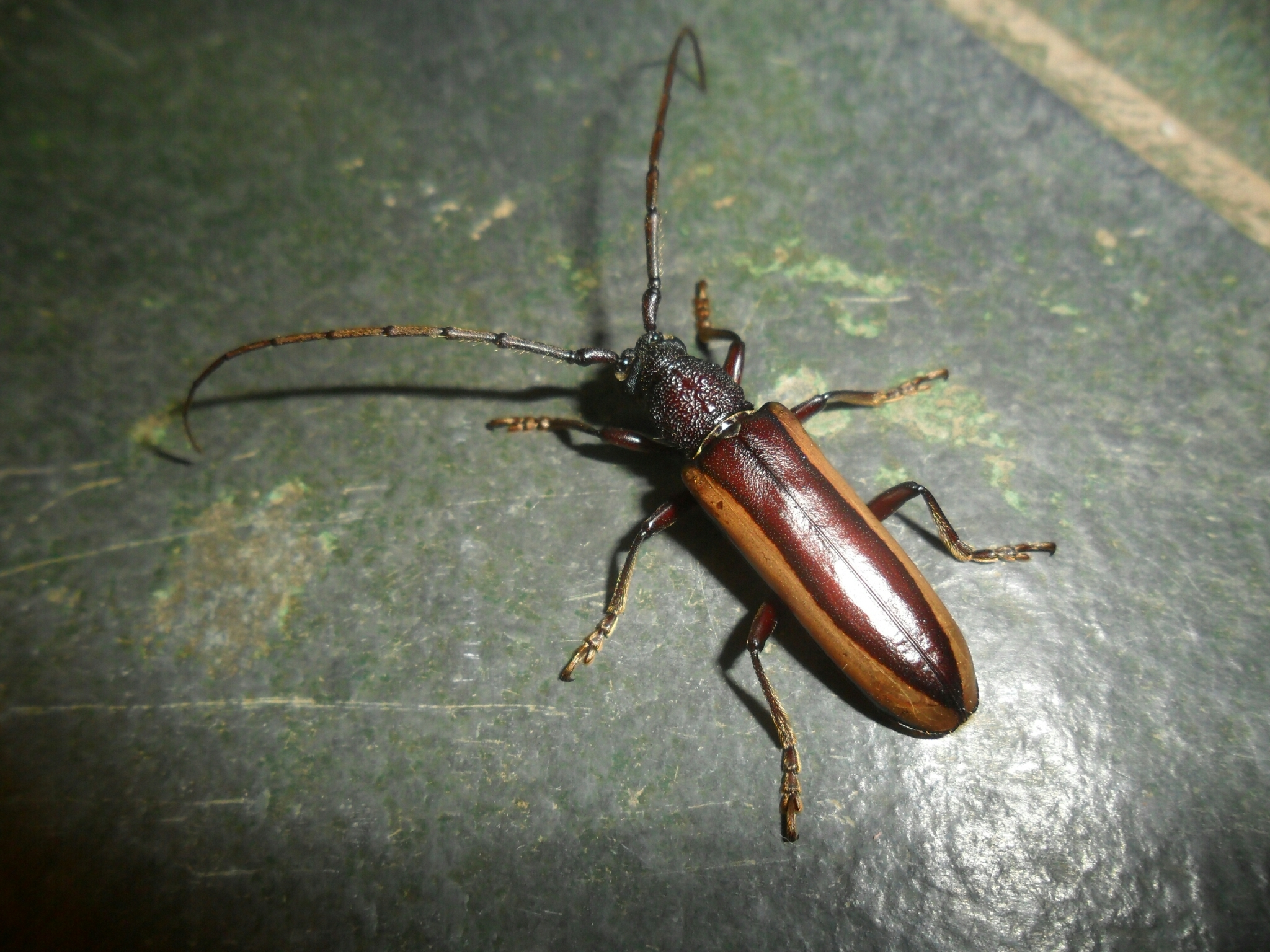
- Poeciloxestia travassosi, Brasil

Scientific classification
- Kingdom: Animalia
- Phylum: Arthropoda
- Class: Insecta
- Order: Coleoptera
- Suborder: Polyphaga
- Infraorder: Cucujiformia
- Family: Cerambycidae
- Subfamily: Cerambycinae
- Tribe: Cerambycini
- Genus: Poeciloxestia
- Species: P. travassosi

Binomial name
- Poeciloxestia travassosi Fragoso, 1978

= Poeciloxestia travassosi =

Species of beetle

Poeciloxestia travassosi is a species in the longhorn beetle family Cerambycidae. It is found in Brazil.
