= Poeciloxestia signatipennis =

Scientific classification
- Kingdom: Animalia
- Phylum: Arthropoda
- Class: Insecta
- Order: Coleoptera
- Suborder: Polyphaga
- Infraorder: Cucujiformia
- Family: Cerambycidae
- Subfamily: Cerambycinae
- Tribe: Cerambycini
- Genus: Poeciloxestia
- Species: P. signatipennis

Binomial name
- Poeciloxestia signatipennis (Melzer, 1923)

Synonyms
- Coleoxestia elegans signatipennis Zikán & Wygodzinsky, 1948

Species of beetle

Poeciloxestia signatipennis is a species in the longhorn beetle family Cerambycidae. It is found in Brazil.
