= Poeciloxestia ochrotaenia =

Scientific classification
- Kingdom: Animalia
- Phylum: Arthropoda
- Class: Insecta
- Order: Coleoptera
- Suborder: Polyphaga
- Infraorder: Cucujiformia
- Family: Cerambycidae
- Subfamily: Cerambycinae
- Tribe: Cerambycini
- Genus: Poeciloxestia
- Species: P. ochrotaenia

Binomial name
- Poeciloxestia ochrotaenia (Bates, 1870)

Synonyms
- Coleoxestia ochrotaenia Aurivillius, 1912; Xestia ochrotaenia Gemminger & Harold, 1872

Species of beetle

Poeciloxestia ochrotaenia is a species in the longhorn beetle family Cerambycidae. It is found in Brazil.
