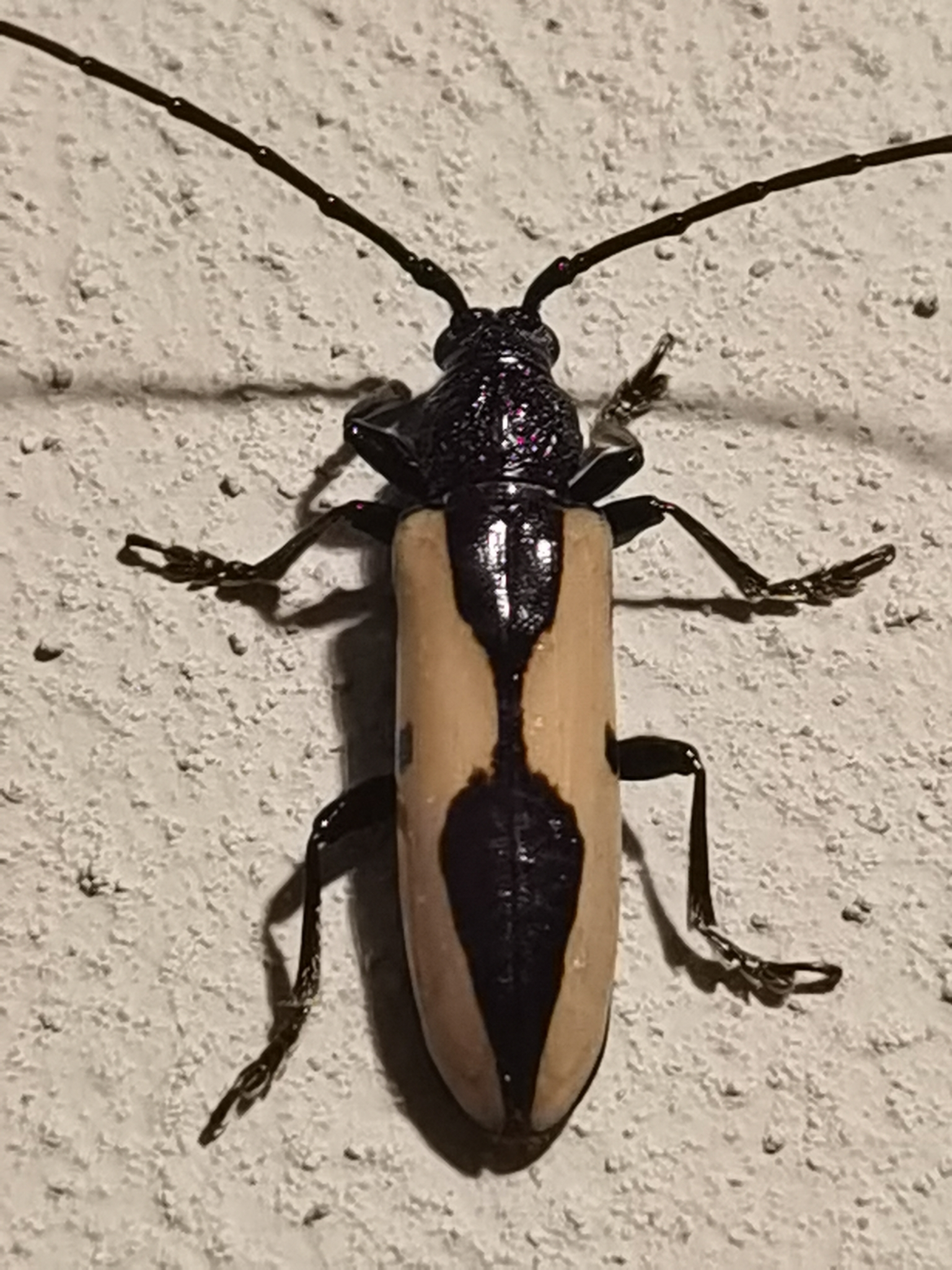
- Poeciloxestia lanceolata, Costa Rica

Scientific classification
- Domain: Eukaryota
- Kingdom: Animalia
- Phylum: Arthropoda
- Class: Insecta
- Order: Coleoptera
- Suborder: Polyphaga
- Infraorder: Cucujiformia
- Family: Cerambycidae
- Subfamily: Cerambycinae
- Tribe: Cerambycini
- Genus: Poeciloxestia; Lane, 1965

= Poeciloxestia =

Genus of beetles

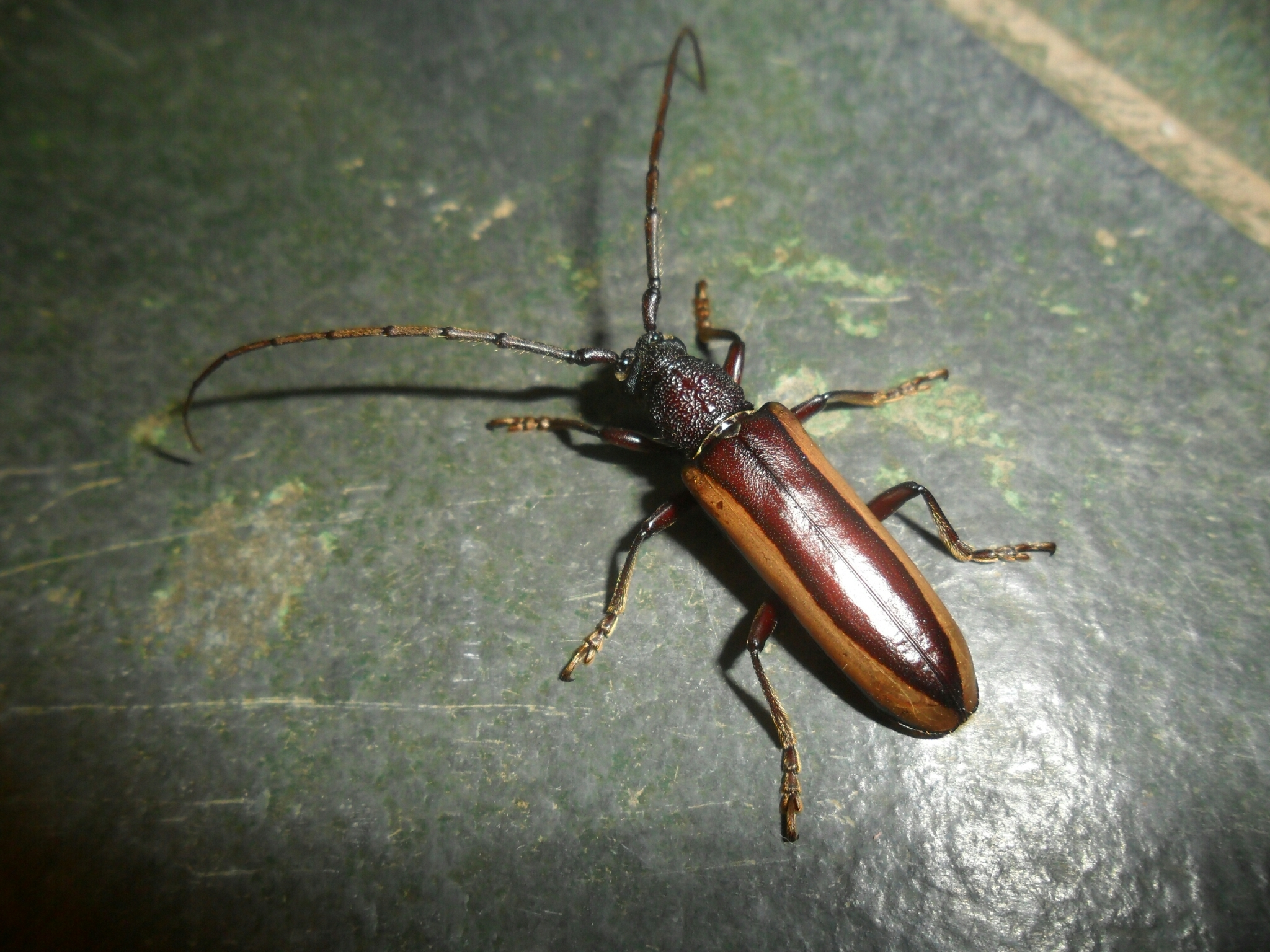
Poeciloxestia travassosi, Brazil

Poeciloxestia is a genus of longhorn beetles in the family Cerambycidae. There are more than 20 described species in Poeciloxestia, found in Central and South America.

== Species ==
These 22 species belong to the genus Poeciloxestia:

- Poeciloxestia bivittata (Buquet, 1852) (Brazil)
- Poeciloxestia carlyslei Fragoso, 1978 (Colombia)
- Poeciloxestia coriacea Martins & Monné, 2005 (Brazil)
- Poeciloxestia dorsalis (Thomson, 1861) (Brazil, Paraguay)
- Poeciloxestia elegans (Gory, 1833) (Brazil)
- Poeciloxestia hirsutiventris Fragoso, 1978 (Bolivia, Peru)
- Poeciloxestia lanceolata Fragoso, 1978 (Central America)
- Poeciloxestia lanei Fragoso, 1978 (Bolivia, Brazil)
- Poeciloxestia lateralis (Erichson, 1847) (Bolivia, French Guiana, Peru)
- Poeciloxestia melzeri Lane, 1965 (Bolivia, Brazil, Peru)
- Poeciloxestia minuta Fragoso, 1978 (Brazil)
- Poeciloxestia nitida Haller & Santos-Silva, 2023
- Poeciloxestia ochrotaenia (Bates, 1870) (Brazil)
- Poeciloxestia paraensis Lane, 1965 (South America)
- Poeciloxestia parallela Fragoso, 1978 (Brazil)
- Poeciloxestia plagiata (Waterhouse, 1880) (Ecuador)
- Poeciloxestia rugosicollis Fragoso, 1978 (Ecuador, Bolivia)
- Poeciloxestia sagittaria (Bates, 1872) (Central and South America)
- Poeciloxestia santossilvai Devesa & Wappes, 2020
- Poeciloxestia signatipennis (Melzer, 1923) (Brazil)
- Poeciloxestia suturalis (Perty, 1832) (Brazil, Paraguay, Bolivia, Argentina)
- Poeciloxestia travassosi Fragoso, 1978 (Brazil)
