= Poeciloxestia hirsutiventris =

Scientific classification
- Kingdom: Animalia
- Phylum: Arthropoda
- Class: Insecta
- Order: Coleoptera
- Suborder: Polyphaga
- Infraorder: Cucujiformia
- Family: Cerambycidae
- Subfamily: Cerambycinae
- Tribe: Cerambycini
- Genus: Poeciloxestia
- Species: P. hirsutiventris

Binomial name
- Poeciloxestia hirsutiventris Fragoso, 1978

Species of beetle

Poeciloxestia hirsutiventris is a species in the longhorn beetle family Cerambycidae. It is found in Bolivia and Peru.
