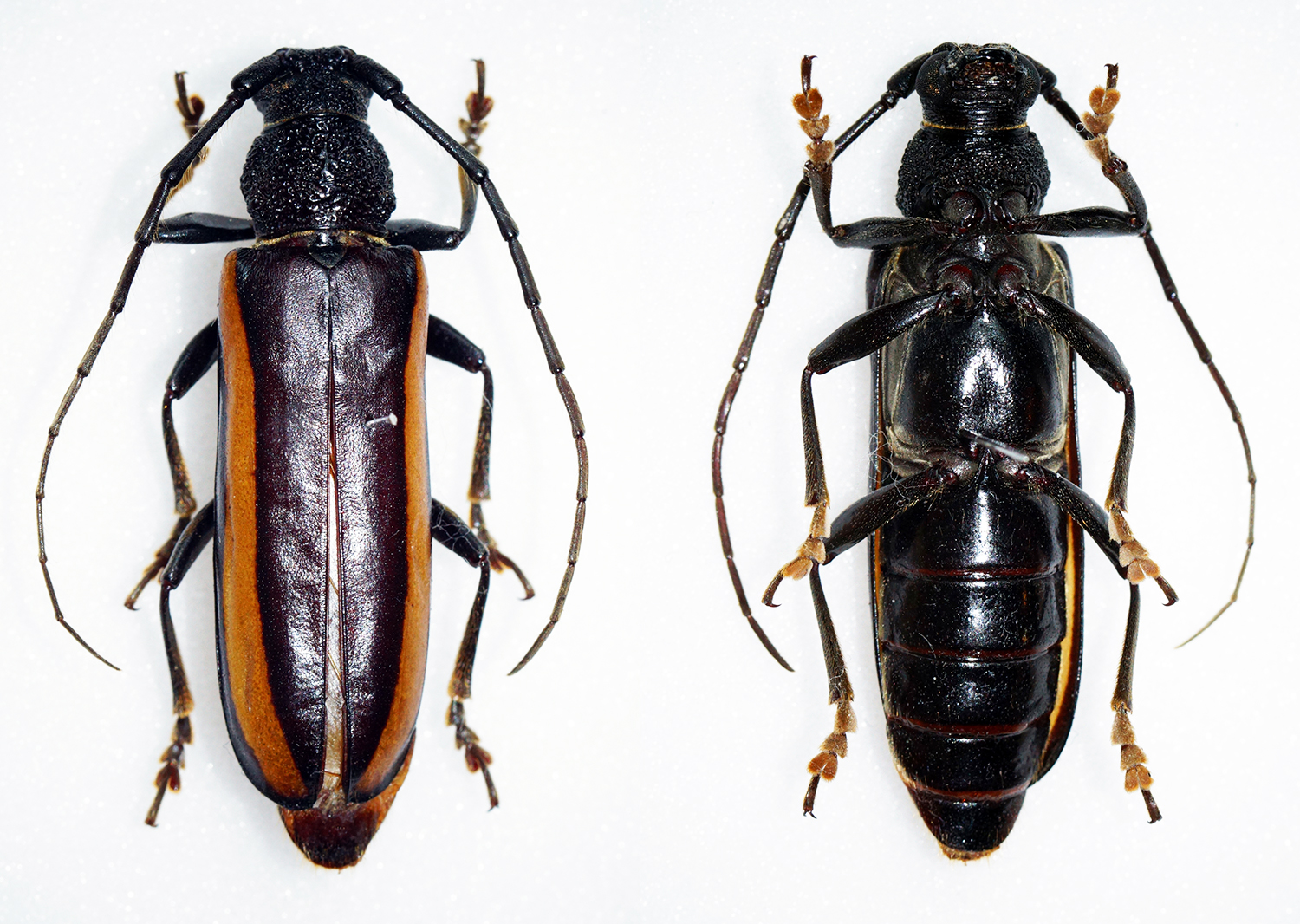

Scientific classification
- Kingdom: Animalia
- Phylum: Arthropoda
- Class: Insecta
- Order: Coleoptera
- Suborder: Polyphaga
- Infraorder: Cucujiformia
- Family: Cerambycidae
- Subfamily: Cerambycinae
- Tribe: Cerambycini
- Genus: Poeciloxestia
- Species: P. lateralis

Binomial name
- Poeciloxestia lateralis (Erichson, 1847)

Synonyms
- Coleoxestia lateralis Aurivillius, 1912; Criodion laterale Gemminger & Harold, 1872; Xestia lateralis Erichson, 1847

= Poeciloxestia lateralis =

Species of beetle

Poeciloxestia lateralis is a species in the longhorn beetle family Cerambycidae. It is found in Bolivia, French Guiana, and Peru.
