= Poeciloxestia bivittata =

Scientific classification
- Kingdom: Animalia
- Phylum: Arthropoda
- Class: Insecta
- Order: Coleoptera
- Suborder: Polyphaga
- Infraorder: Cucujiformia
- Family: Cerambycidae
- Subfamily: Cerambycinae
- Tribe: Cerambycini
- Genus: Poeciloxestia
- Species: P. bivittata

Binomial name
- Poeciloxestia bivittata (Buquet, 1852)

Synonyms
- Coleoxestia bivittata Blackwelder, 1946; Coleoxestia omega Zajciw, 1972; Criodion 2-vittatum Strauch, 1861; Criodion bivittatum Gemminger & Harold, 1872; Xestia bivittata Gahan, 1892

Species of beetle

Poeciloxestia bivittata is a species in the longhorn beetle family Cerambycidae. It is found in Brazil.
