= Poeciloxestia dorsalis =

Scientific classification
- Kingdom: Animalia
- Phylum: Arthropoda
- Class: Insecta
- Order: Coleoptera
- Suborder: Polyphaga
- Infraorder: Cucujiformia
- Family: Cerambycidae
- Subfamily: Cerambycinae
- Tribe: Cerambycini
- Genus: Poeciloxestia
- Species: P. dorsalis

Binomial name
- Poeciloxestia dorsalis (Thomson, 1861)

Synonyms
- Coleoxestia dorsale Viana, 1972; Coleoxestia dorsalis Aurivillius, 1912; Criodion dorsale Gemminger & Harold, 1872; Xestia dorsalis Gahan, 1892

Species of beetle

Poeciloxestia dorsalis is a species in the longhorn beetle family Cerambycidae. It is found in Brazil and Paraguay.
