= Poeciloxestia melzeri =

Scientific classification
- Kingdom: Animalia
- Phylum: Arthropoda
- Class: Insecta
- Order: Coleoptera
- Suborder: Polyphaga
- Infraorder: Cucujiformia
- Family: Cerambycidae
- Subfamily: Cerambycinae
- Tribe: Cerambycini
- Genus: Poeciloxestia
- Species: P. melzeri

Binomial name
- Poeciloxestia melzeri Lane, 1965

Synonyms
- Coleoxestia sagittaria Zikán & Zikán, 1944

Species of beetle

Poeciloxestia melzeri is a species in the longhorn beetle family Cerambycidae. It is found in Bolivia, Brazil, and Peru.
