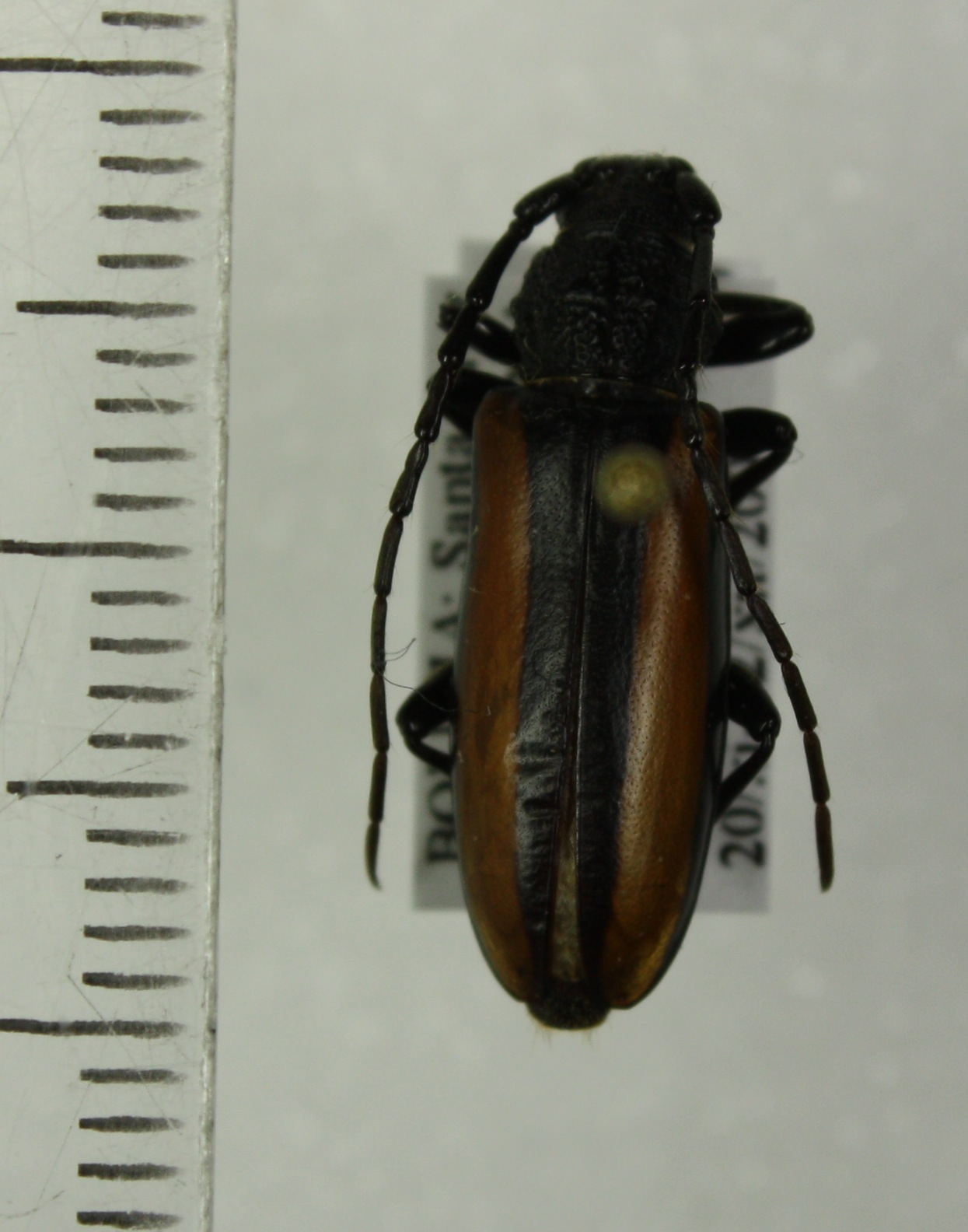

Scientific classification
- Kingdom: Animalia
- Phylum: Arthropoda
- Class: Insecta
- Order: Coleoptera
- Suborder: Polyphaga
- Infraorder: Cucujiformia
- Family: Cerambycidae
- Subfamily: Cerambycinae
- Tribe: Cerambycini
- Genus: Poeciloxestia
- Species: P. suturalis

Binomial name
- Poeciloxestia suturalis (Perty, 1832)

Synonyms
- Coleoxestia bivittata Zajciw, 1967; Stenochorus suturalis Perty, 1832; Xestia suturalis Gahan, 1904

= Poeciloxestia suturalis =

Species of beetle

Poeciloxestia suturalis is a species in the longhorn beetle family Cerambycidae. It is found in Brazil, Paraguay, Bolivia, and Argentina.
