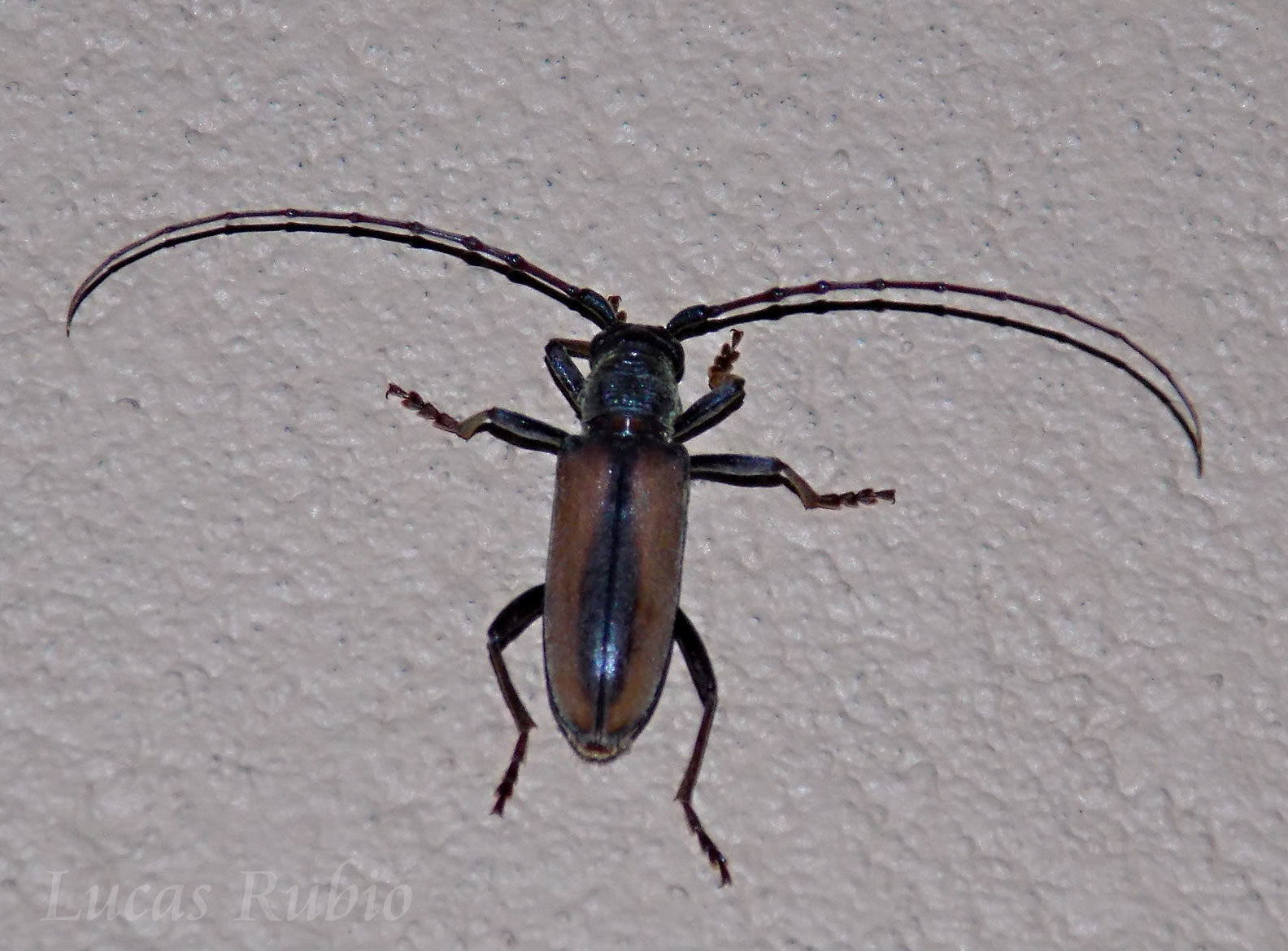
- Hamaederus pactor, Argentina

Scientific classification
- Kingdom: Animalia
- Phylum: Arthropoda
- Class: Insecta
- Order: Coleoptera
- Suborder: Polyphaga
- Infraorder: Cucujiformia
- Family: Cerambycidae
- Subfamily: Cerambycinae
- Tribe: Cerambycini
- Subtribe: Cerambycina
- Genus: Hamaederus
- Species: H. pactor

Binomial name
- Hamaederus pactor (Lameere, 1885)

Synonyms
- Plocaederus pactor (Lameere, 1885)

= Hamaederus pactor =

Species of beetle

Hamaederus pactor is a species in the longhorn beetle family Cerambycidae. It is found in Uruguay, Argentina, Bolivia, Brazil, and Paraguay.

This species is sometimes treated as a member of the genus Plocaederus.
