= Hamaederus plicatus =

Scientific classification
- Kingdom: Animalia
- Phylum: Arthropoda
- Clade: Pancrustacea
- Class: Insecta
- Order: Coleoptera
- Suborder: Polyphaga
- Infraorder: Cucujiformia
- Family: Cerambycidae
- Subfamily: Cerambycinae
- Tribe: Cerambycini
- Subtribe: Cerambycina
- Genus: Hamaederus
- Species: H. plicatus

Binomial name
- Hamaederus plicatus (Olivier, 1790)

Synonyms
- Plocaederus plicatus (Olivier, 1790)

Species of beetle

Hamaederus plicatus is a species in the longhorn beetle family Cerambycidae. It is found in Venezuela, Bolivia, Brazil, French Guiana, and Suriname.

This species is sometimes treated as a member of the genus Plocaederus.
