= Hamaederus fragosoi =

Scientific classification
- Kingdom: Animalia
- Phylum: Arthropoda
- Class: Insecta
- Order: Coleoptera
- Suborder: Polyphaga
- Infraorder: Cucujiformia
- Family: Cerambycidae
- Subfamily: Cerambycinae
- Tribe: Cerambycini
- Subtribe: Cerambycina
- Genus: Hamaederus
- Species: H. fragosoi

Binomial name
- Hamaederus fragosoi (Martins & Monné, 2002)

Synonyms
- Plocaederus fragosoi (Martins & Monné, 2002)

Species of beetle

Hamaederus fragosoi is a species in the longhorn beetle family Cerambycidae. It is found in Brazil and French Guiana.

This species is sometimes treated as a member of the genus Plocaederus.
