= Hamaederus rugosus =

Scientific classification
- Kingdom: Animalia
- Phylum: Arthropoda
- Clade: Pancrustacea
- Class: Insecta
- Order: Coleoptera
- Suborder: Polyphaga
- Infraorder: Cucujiformia
- Family: Cerambycidae
- Subfamily: Cerambycinae
- Tribe: Cerambycini
- Subtribe: Cerambycina
- Genus: Hamaederus
- Species: H. rugosus

Binomial name
- Hamaederus rugosus (Olivier, 1795)

Synonyms
- Plocaederus rugosus (Olivier, 1795)

Species of beetle

Hamaederus rugosus is a species in the longhorn beetle family Cerambycidae. It is found in French Guiana and Brazil.

This species is sometimes treated as a member of the genus Plocaederus.
