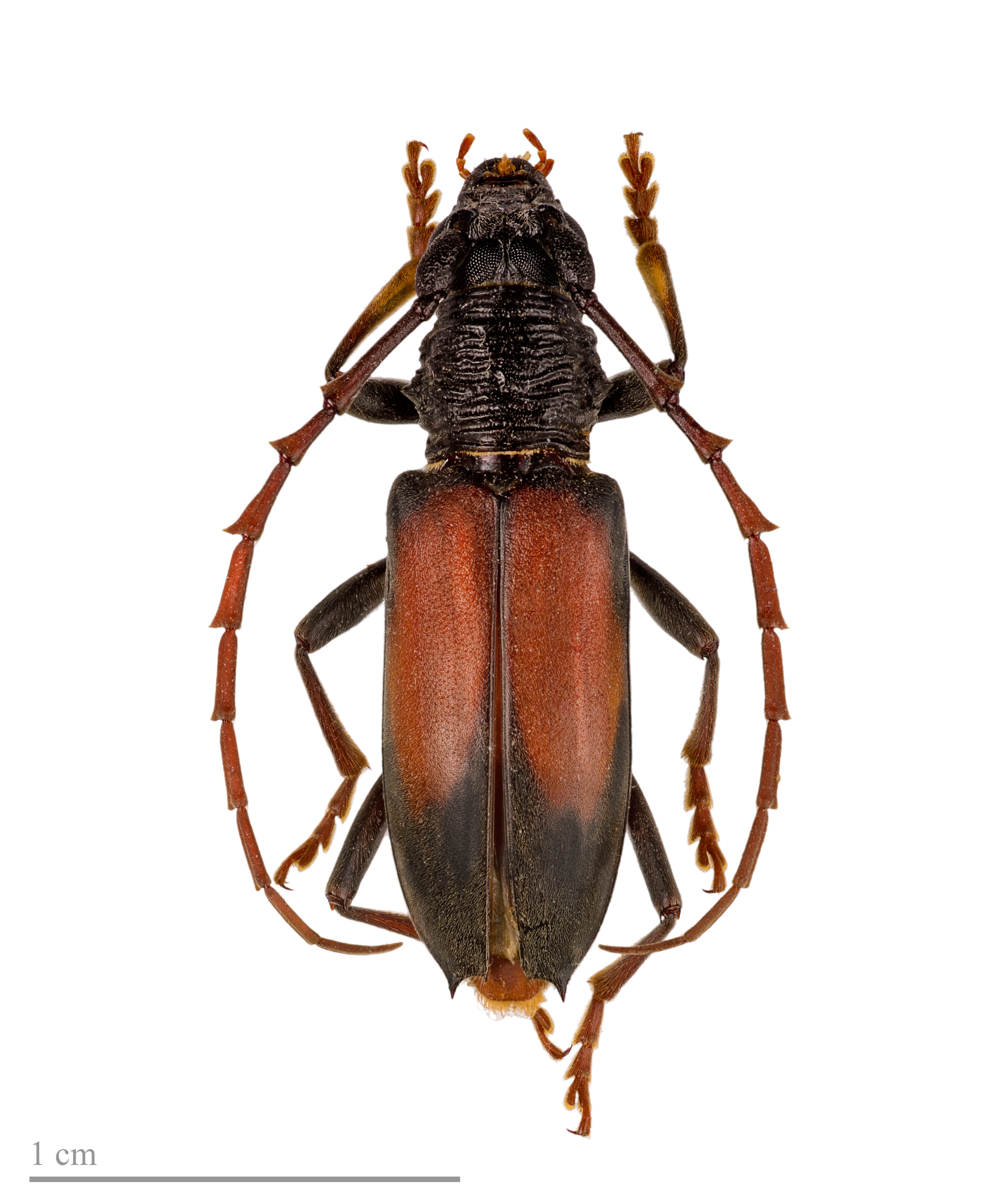

Scientific classification
- Kingdom: Animalia
- Phylum: Arthropoda
- Class: Insecta
- Order: Coleoptera
- Suborder: Polyphaga
- Infraorder: Cucujiformia
- Family: Cerambycidae
- Subfamily: Cerambycinae
- Tribe: Cerambycini
- Subtribe: Cerambycina
- Genus: Hamaederus
- Species: H. bipartitus

Binomial name
- Hamaederus bipartitus (Buquet, 1860)

Synonyms
- Plocaederus bipartitus Buquet, 1860; Brasilianus bipartitus Blackwelder, 1946; Hamaticherus bipartitus Aurivillius, 1912; Hammaticherus bipartitus Lacordaire, 1869; Hammatochaerus bipartitus Gemminger & Harold, 1872

= Hamaederus bipartitus =

Species of beetle

Hamaederus bipartitus is a species in the longhorn beetle family Cerambycidae. It is found in Suriname, French Guiana, Ecuador, Bolivia, and Brazil.

This species is sometimes treated as a member of the genus Plocaederus.
