= Hamaederus fasciatus =

Scientific classification
- Kingdom: Animalia
- Phylum: Arthropoda
- Class: Insecta
- Order: Coleoptera
- Suborder: Polyphaga
- Infraorder: Cucujiformia
- Family: Cerambycidae
- Subfamily: Cerambycinae
- Tribe: Cerambycini
- Subtribe: Cerambycina
- Genus: Hamaederus
- Species: H. fasciatus

Binomial name
- Hamaederus fasciatus (Martins & Monné, 1975)

Synonyms
- Plocaederus fasciatus (Martins & Monné, 1975)

Species of beetle

Hamaederus fasciatus is a species in the longhorn beetle family Cerambycidae. It is found in Brazil, Ecuador, and French Guiana.

This species is sometimes treated as a member of the genus Plocaederus.
