= Hamaederus allofasciatus =

Scientific classification
- Kingdom: Animalia
- Phylum: Arthropoda
- Class: Insecta
- Order: Coleoptera
- Suborder: Polyphaga
- Infraorder: Cucujiformia
- Family: Cerambycidae
- Subfamily: Cerambycinae
- Tribe: Cerambycini
- Subtribe: Cerambycina
- Genus: Hamaederus
- Species: H. allofasciatus

Binomial name
- Hamaederus allofasciatus Santos-Silva, García & Botero, 2021

Synonyms
- Plocaederus fasciatus (ambiguous)

Species of beetle

Hamaederus allofasciatus is a species in the longhorn beetle, family Cerambycidae. It is found in French Guiana. The total length is 8.1–9.7 mm (0.32–0.38 in).
