= Plocaederus bellator =

Scientific classification
- Kingdom: Animalia
- Phylum: Arthropoda
- Class: Insecta
- Order: Coleoptera
- Suborder: Polyphaga
- Infraorder: Cucujiformia
- Family: Cerambycidae
- Subfamily: Cerambycinae
- Tribe: Cerambycini
- Genus: Plocaederus
- Species: P. bellator

Binomial name
- Plocaederus bellator (Audinet-Serville, 1834)

Synonyms
- Hamaticherus bellator (Audinet-Serville, 1834)

Genus of beetles

Plocaederus bellator is a species in the longhorn beetle family Cerambycidae. It is known from the South American countries Brazil, Ecuador, Guyana, French Guiana, Paraguay, and Suriname.
