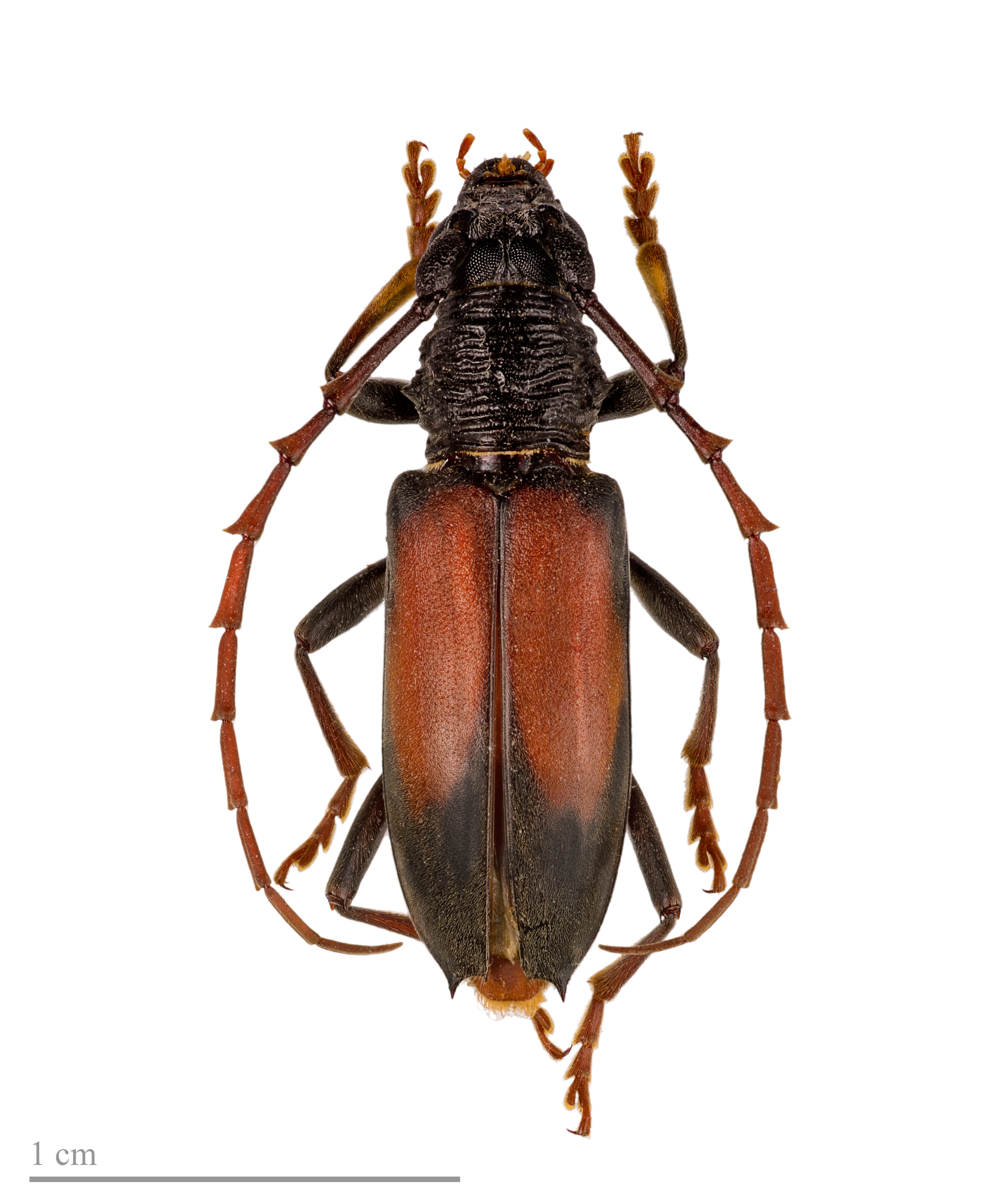
- Plocaederus bipartitus

Scientific classification
- Kingdom: Animalia
- Phylum: Arthropoda
- Class: Insecta
- Order: Coleoptera
- Suborder: Polyphaga
- Infraorder: Cucujiformia
- Family: Cerambycidae
- Subfamily: Cerambycinae
- Tribe: Cerambycini
- Genus: Plocaederus; Dejean, 1835
- Species: P. bellator

Binomial name
- Plocaederus bellator (Audinet-Serville, 1834)

Synonyms
- Brasilianus Jakobson, 1924

= Plocaederus =

Genus of beetles

Plocaederus is a genus of Long-Horned Beetles in the beetle family Cerambycidae. This genus has a single species, Plocaederus bellator. It is known from the South American countries Brazil, Ecuador, Guyana, French Guiana, Paraguay, and Suriname.

Research in 2021 resulted in the placement of about 17 species of this genus, all but Plocaederus bellator, into the genus Hamaederus. The Hamaederus species bipartitus, dozieri, fasciatus, fragosoi, fraterculus, glaberrimus, glabricollis, inconstans, mirim, pactor, pisinnus, plicatus, rugosus, rusticus, and yucatecus are sometimes still treated as members of the genus Plocaederus.
