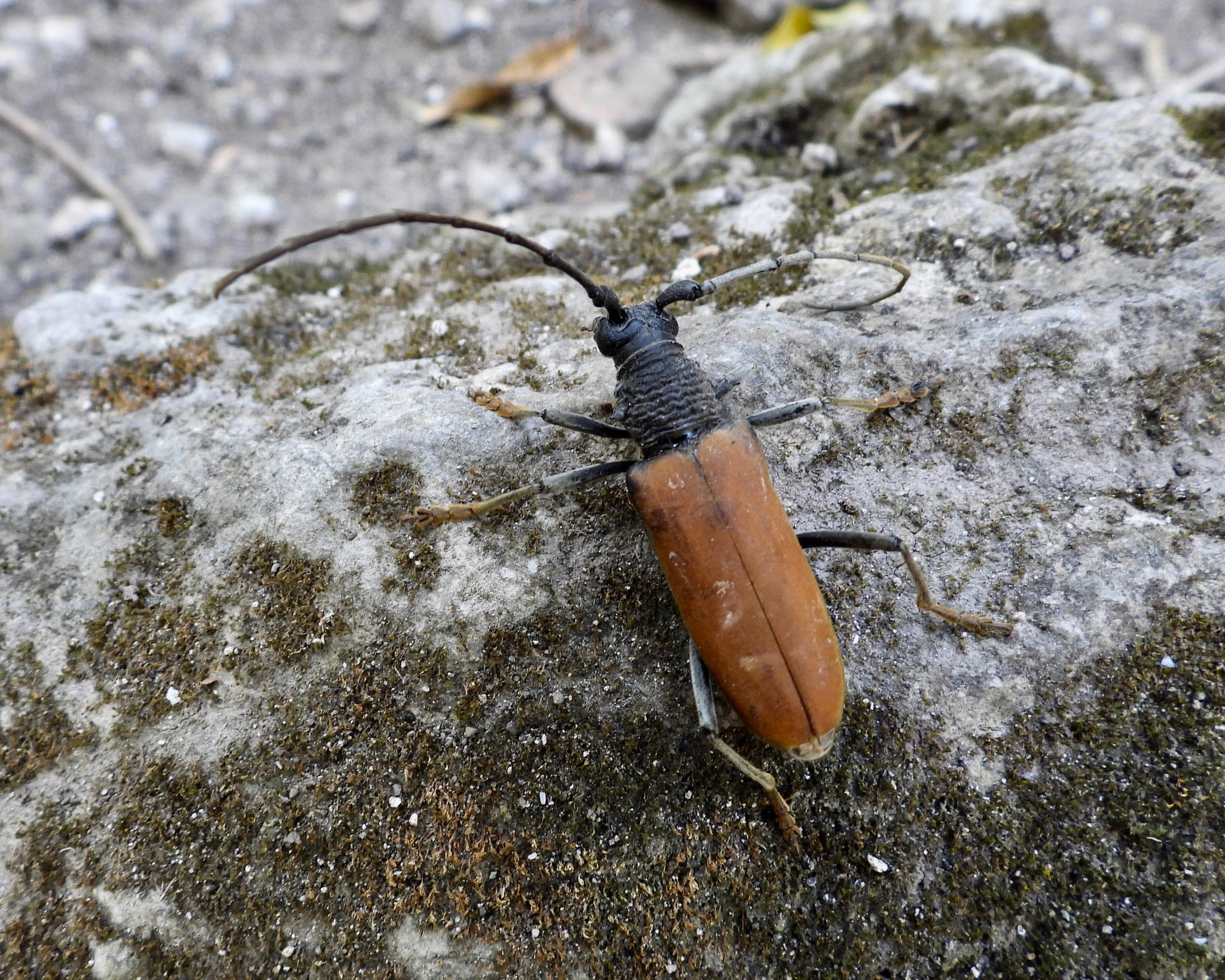
- Hamaederus yucatecus, Guatemala

Scientific classification
- Kingdom: Animalia
- Phylum: Arthropoda
- Class: Insecta
- Order: Coleoptera
- Suborder: Polyphaga
- Infraorder: Cucujiformia
- Family: Cerambycidae
- Subfamily: Cerambycinae
- Tribe: Cerambycini
- Subtribe: Cerambycina
- Genus: Hamaederus; Santos-Silva, García & Botero, 2021

= Hamaederus =

Genus of beetles

Hamaederus is a genus in the longhorn beetle family Cerambycidae. There are about 16 described species in Hamaederus, found in Mexico, Central America, and South America. Most of these species were formerly members of the genus Plocaederus.

== Species ==
These 16 species belong to the genus Hamaederus:

- Hamaederus allofasciatus Santos-Silva, García & Botero, 2021 (French Guiana)
- Hamaederus bipartitus (Buquet, 1860) (French Guiana, Suriname, Brazil, Bolivia, Ecuador)
- Hamaederus dozieri (Martins & Galileo, 2010) (Trinidad & Tobago)
- Hamaederus fasciatus (Martins & Monné, 1975) (Ecuador, Bolivia)
- Hamaederus fragosoi (Martins & Monné, 2002) (French Guiana, Brazil)
- Hamaederus fraterculus (Martins, 1979) (Bolivia, Paraguay)
- Hamaederus glaberrimus (Martins, 1979) (Brazil, Ecuador)
- Hamaederus glabricollis (Bates, 1870) (Brazil, Peru, Ecuador, Bolivia)
- Hamaederus inconstans (Gounelle, 1913) (Brazil, Argentina, Paraguay, Uruguay)
- Hamaederus mirim (Martins & Monné, 2002) (French Guiana, Brazil)
- Hamaederus pactor (Lameere, 1885) (Brazil, Paraguay, Argentina, Uruguay)
- Hamaederus pisinnus (Martins & Monné, 1975) (Paraguay, Argentina)
- Hamaederus plicatus (Olivier, 1790) (Mexico, Central America, South America)
- Hamaederus rugosus (Olivier, 1795) (French Guiana, Brazil)
- Hamaederus rusticus (Gounelle, 1909) (French Guiana, Brazil, Bolivia, Peru)
- Hamaederus yucatecus (Chemsak & Noguera, 1997) (Mexico, Central America, South America)
