= Hamaederus inconstans =

Scientific classification
- Kingdom: Animalia
- Phylum: Arthropoda
- Class: Insecta
- Order: Coleoptera
- Suborder: Polyphaga
- Infraorder: Cucujiformia
- Family: Cerambycidae
- Subfamily: Cerambycinae
- Tribe: Cerambycini
- Subtribe: Cerambycina
- Genus: Hamaederus
- Species: H. inconstans

Binomial name
- Hamaederus inconstans (Gounelle, 1913)

Synonyms
- Plocaederus inconstans (Gounelle, 1913)

Species of beetle

Hamaederus inconstans is a species in the longhorn beetle family Cerambycidae. It is found in Argentina, Brazil, Paraguay, and Uruguay.

This species is sometimes treated as a member of the genus Plocaederus.
