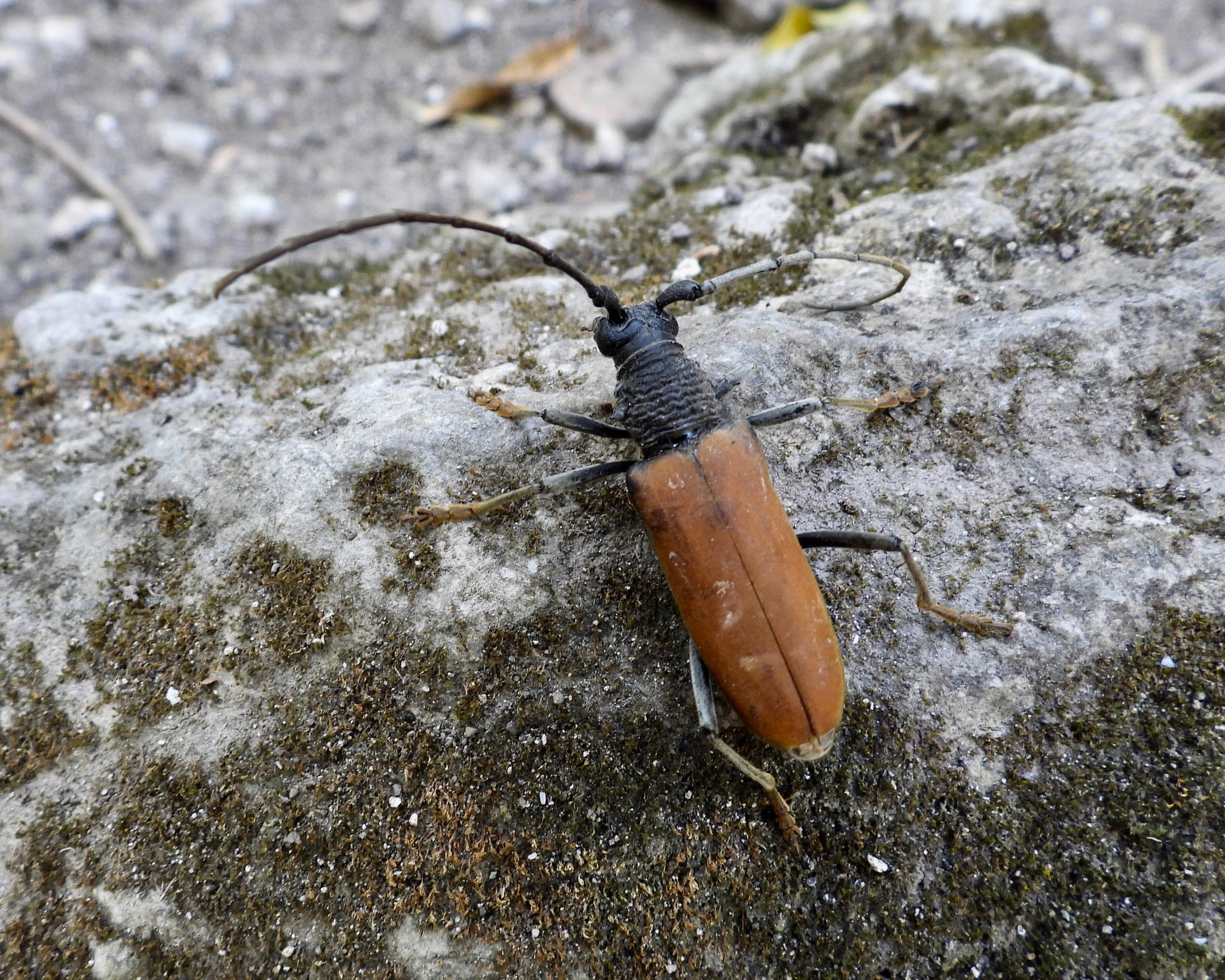
- Hamaederus yucatecus, Guatemala

Scientific classification
- Kingdom: Animalia
- Phylum: Arthropoda
- Class: Insecta
- Order: Coleoptera
- Suborder: Polyphaga
- Infraorder: Cucujiformia
- Family: Cerambycidae
- Subfamily: Cerambycinae
- Tribe: Cerambycini
- Subtribe: Cerambycina
- Genus: Hamaederus
- Species: H. yucatecus

Binomial name
- Hamaederus yucatecus (Chemsak & Noguera, 1997)

Synonyms
- Plocaederus yucatecus (Chemsak & Noguera, 1997); Plocaederus barauna Martins & Monné, 2002; Plocaederus confusus Martins & Monné, 2002

= Hamaederus yucatecus =

Species of beetle

Hamaederus yucatecus is a species in the longhorn beetle family Cerambycidae. It is found in Costa Rica, Guatemala, Honduras, Mexico, and Nicaragua.

This species is sometimes treated as a member of the genus Plocaederus.
