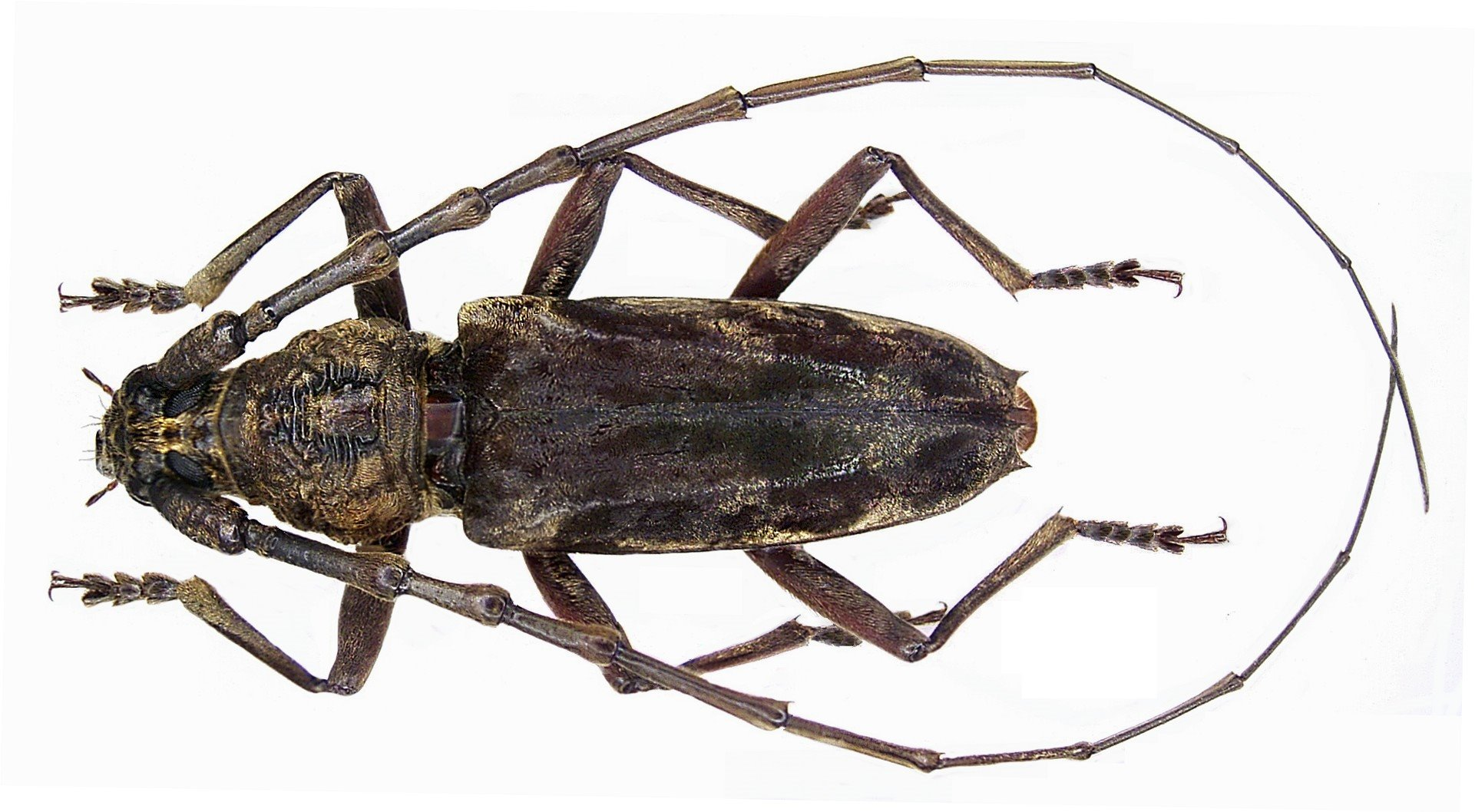
- Aeolesthes textor

Scientific classification
- Kingdom: Animalia
- Phylum: Arthropoda
- Class: Insecta
- Order: Coleoptera
- Suborder: Polyphaga
- Infraorder: Cucujiformia
- Family: Cerambycidae
- Subfamily: Cerambycinae
- Tribe: Cerambycini
- Genus: Aeolesthes; Gahan, 1890

= Aeolesthes =

Genus of beetles

Aeolesthes is a genus of beetles belonging to the family Cerambycidae.

The species of this genus are found in Southeastern Asia and Australia.

== Taxonomy ==
The limits of the genus were redefined in 2017, removing most of the species formerly in the genus, and placing them into other genera, such as Derolus, Dymasius, Pseudaeolesthes, and Trirachys.

== Species ==
- Aeolesthes aurifaber (White, 1853)
- Aeolesthes bilobulartus (Gressitt & Rondon, 1970)
- Aeolesthes gloriosa (Aurivillius, 1924)
- Aeolesthes sarta ((Solsky 1871))
- Aeolesthes vietnamensis Vitali, Gouverneur & Chemin, 2017
