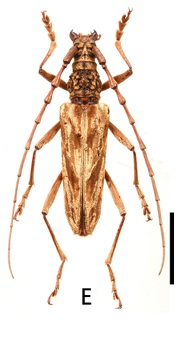
- Male
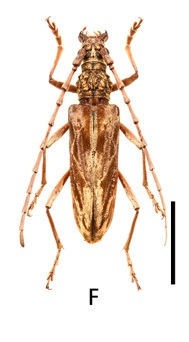
- Female

Scientific classification
- Domain: Eukaryota
- Kingdom: Animalia
- Phylum: Arthropoda
- Class: Insecta
- Order: Coleoptera
- Suborder: Polyphaga
- Infraorder: Cucujiformia
- Family: Cerambycidae
- Genus: Pseudaeolesthes
- Species: P. aureopilosa

Binomial name
- Pseudaeolesthes aureopilosa (Gressitt & Rondon, 1970)

Synonyms
- Aeolesthes (Pseudaeolesthes) aureopilosa Gressitt & Rondon, 1970

= Pseudaeolesthes aureopilosa =

Species of beetle

Pseudaeolesthes aureopilosa is a species of beetle in the family Cerambycidae. This species is found in Laos, Vietnam and China (Yunnan).
