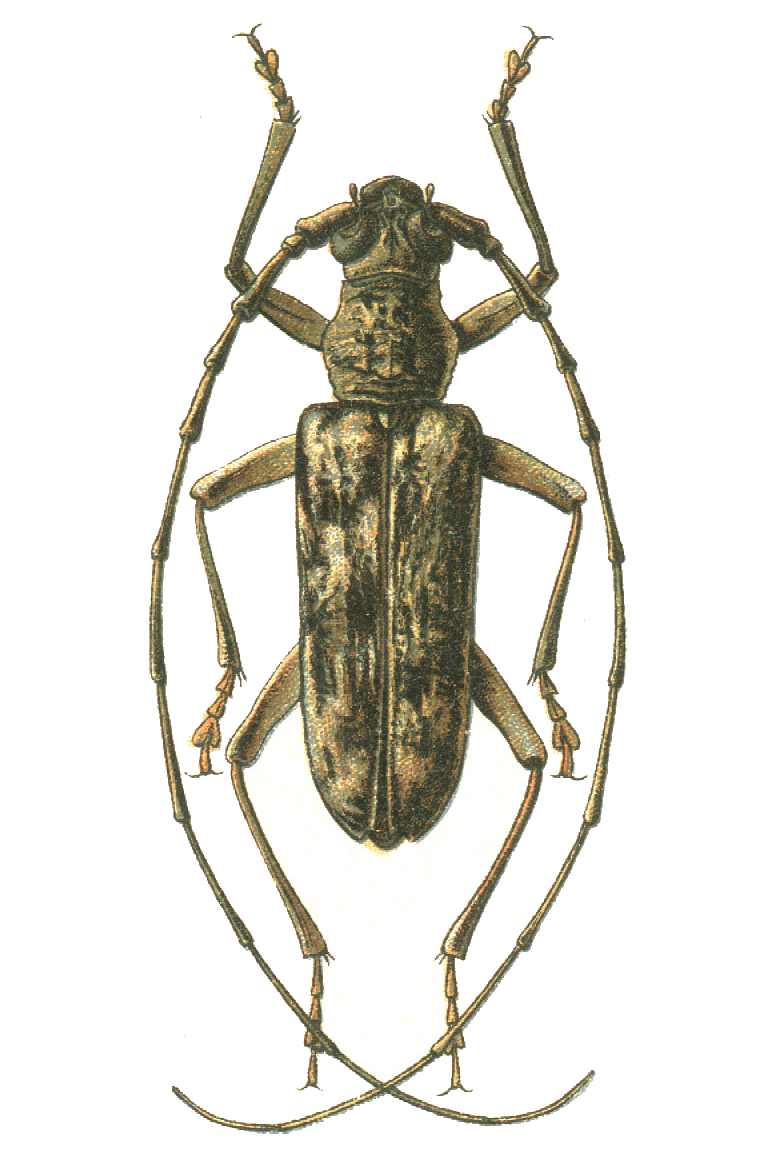

Scientific classification
- Kingdom: Animalia
- Phylum: Arthropoda
- Class: Insecta
- Order: Coleoptera
- Suborder: Polyphaga
- Infraorder: Cucujiformia
- Family: Cerambycidae
- Genus: Aeolesthes
- Species: A. sarta

Binomial name
- Aeolesthes sarta (Solsky 1871)

Synonyms

= Aeolesthes sarta =

Species of beetle

Aeolesthes sarta, commonly known as the city longhorn beetle, is a species of beetle in the family Cerambycidae, the longhorn beetles.

== Identification ==
=== Physical ===
Eggs are approximately 3 mm (0 in)-4 mm (0 in) long and white colored. On the larva stage yellowish, 60 mm (2 in)-70 mm (3 in) long, with golden hair and black mandibles. During adulthood, they are dark greyish-brown, elongated, 28 mm (1 in)-47 mm (2 in) long and covered with silver hair. They also have silver, shiny spots that form two bands crossing the elytra. In addition, males are smaller in size than females. The males’ antennae are longer than their bodies whereas females’ antennae are shorter than their bodies.

=== Behavioral ===
Females lay 1–3 eggs after emerging from pupation cells into large branches or bark, and into old larvae galleries. In total females lay approximately 270 eggs in their lifetime. Eggs take 9–17 days to completely develop during summertime, and in late summer, larvae reach 50 mm (2 in)-60 mm (2 in) long. During autumn and springtime larvae penetrate into the wood into galleries, which are oriented upward and then downward like a bow. Pupation takes place during late summer and adults emerge during early autumn/summer but do not leave the little galleries chambers until the next spring. In total the life cycle of Aeolesthes sarta takes 2 years.

== Distribution ==
The origin of the Aeolesthes sarta is Pakistan and Western India. They spread to Afghanistan and Iran, and were first found in 1911 in Samarkand, a city in Uzbekistan in Central Asia. Present distribution includes Afghanistan, India, Himachal Pradesh, Jammu and Kashmir, Iran, Kyrgyzstan, Pakistan, Tajikistan, Turkmenistan, Uzbekistan, and former USSR. The invasive insects can be found in mountains with altitudes up to 2,000 m (6,562 ft).

== Modes of distribution ==
Aeolesthes sarta may be transported, at many different life stages, in untreated traded wood. Adults can be carried on many different surfaces. They do not attack branches, rootstocks, and trunks. For this reason, it is unlikely that they are transported in plants.

== Ecological role ==
Aeolesthes sarta can attack both healthy and stressed trees. The pests are known to feed on at least fifteen different plant species. Generations of the pests remain on the same tree for many consecutive years before the tree dies. Young trees, that have thin barks, are more susceptible to the pest. A young larva can circle around a tree eating its cambium, or secondary layer, which will cause the tree to die quickly.

Aeolesthes sarta has caused damage to several plantations, and as a result there are no large trees in Tashauz, Turkmenistan. Aeolesthes Sarta contributes to the disruption of ecological homeostasis in natural and urban forests located in hot/dry geographical zones where reforestation is difficult. This had a huge economic and environmental effect on the country or society. Walnut trees in Kashmir Valley have been severely damaged due to Aeolesthes Sarta. Budgam has the greatest impact with 40% of walnut trees damaged. Walnut trees are one of the species more susceptible to be infected with Aeolesthes Sarta, but is also one of the most economically prosperous plant species, due to its tradeable fruit, which can be edible and also use the shells as fuel, and hardwood that is extremely valuable, high quality wood and used to make furniture, decorative items, etc. Walnut trees also serve as an employment opportunity for women. This is, that the more Walnut trees invaded by Aeolesthes Sarta, the more of them will be taken down and the more female unemployment will be.

== Management ==
The countries and regions affected by Aeolesthes sarta are trying to keep the pest under control by cutting and burning all infected trees, replanting plant species that may be more resistant to the pest, and/or treating the new and existing trees with chemicals to prevent Aeolesthes Sarta from spreading. In addition, to contributing biological and microbiological research institutions successfully perform experiments for pest control. Experiments have shown the pesticides imidacloprid and permethrin to be effective, when sprayed on elm trees, in killing the pests and preventing the deposit of the beetle eggs into the tree bark. More testing still needs to be done on the effective dosage of insecticide needed for pest elimination.
