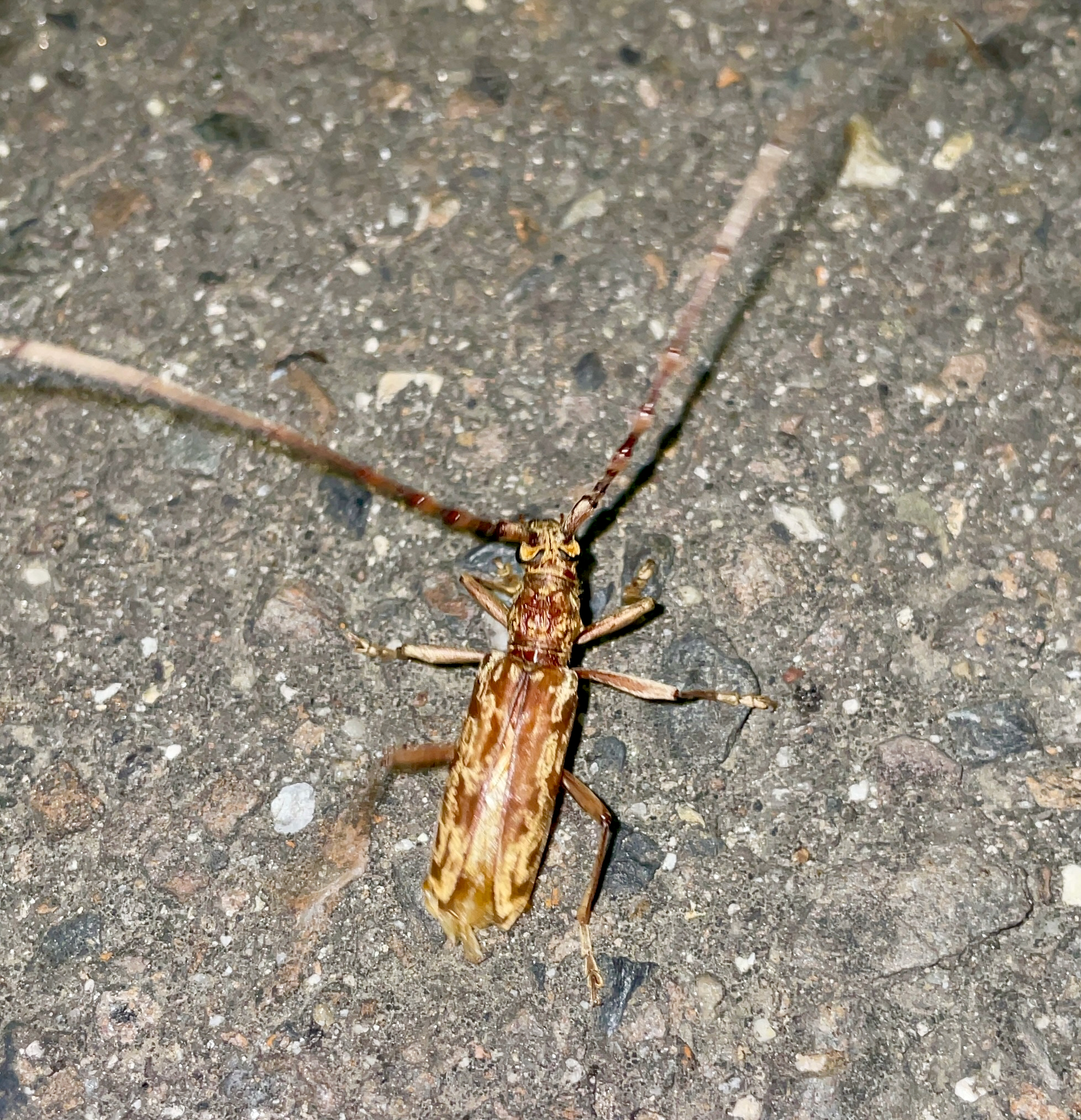

Scientific classification
- Domain: Eukaryota
- Kingdom: Animalia
- Phylum: Arthropoda
- Class: Insecta
- Order: Coleoptera
- Suborder: Polyphaga
- Infraorder: Cucujiformia
- Family: Cerambycidae
- Genus: Pseudaeolesthes
- Species: P. chrysothrix

Binomial name
- Pseudaeolesthes chrysothrix (Bates, 1873)

Synonyms
- Neocerambyx chrysothrix Bates, 1873; Neocerambyx batesi Harold, 1875; Aeolesthes chrysothrix fukidai Fujita, 2018; Pseudaeolesthes kurosawai Gressitt, 1965; Aeolesthes (Pseudaeolesthes) chrysothrix nakamurai Kusama & Takakuwa, 1984; Aeolesthes (Pseudaeolesthes) chrysothrix taiwanensis Hayashi, 1974

= Pseudaeolesthes chrysothrix =

Species of beetle

Pseudaeolesthes chrysothrix is a species of beetle in the family Cerambycidae. This species is found in Japan, Taiwan and China.

== Subspecies ==
- Pseudaeolesthes chrysothrix chrysothrix (Japan [Honshu, Shikoku, and Kyushu], Taiwan, China [Shandong, Shaanxi, Hubei, Zhejiang, Guizhou])
- Pseudaeolesthes chrysothrix fukidai (Fujita, 2018) (Japan: Amami Islands)
- Pseudaeolesthes chrysothrix kurosawai Gressitt, 1965 (Japan: Mikyo, Tokunoshima Island, Northern Ryukyu Islands)
- Pseudaeolesthes chrysothrix nakamurai (Kusama & Takakuwa, 1984) (Japan, Okinawa, Ishigaki-Jima)
- Pseudaeolesthes chrysothrix taiwanensis (Hayashi, 1974) (Taiwan)
- Pseudaeolesthes chrysothrix tibetana Gressitt, 1942 (China: Tibet, Guizhou, Guangxi, Hainan, Xizang, Yunnan)
- Pseudaeolesthes chrysothrix yonaguniensis Ohbayashi & Ohbayashi, 1965 (Japan: Yonaguni Island)
