= Pseudaeolesthes =

Scientific classification
- Domain: Eukaryota
- Kingdom: Animalia
- Phylum: Arthropoda
- Class: Insecta
- Order: Coleoptera
- Suborder: Polyphaga
- Infraorder: Cucujiformia
- Family: Cerambycidae
- Subfamily: Cerambycinae
- Tribe: Cerambycini
- Genus: Pseudaeolesthes; Plavilstshikov, 1931

Genus of beetles

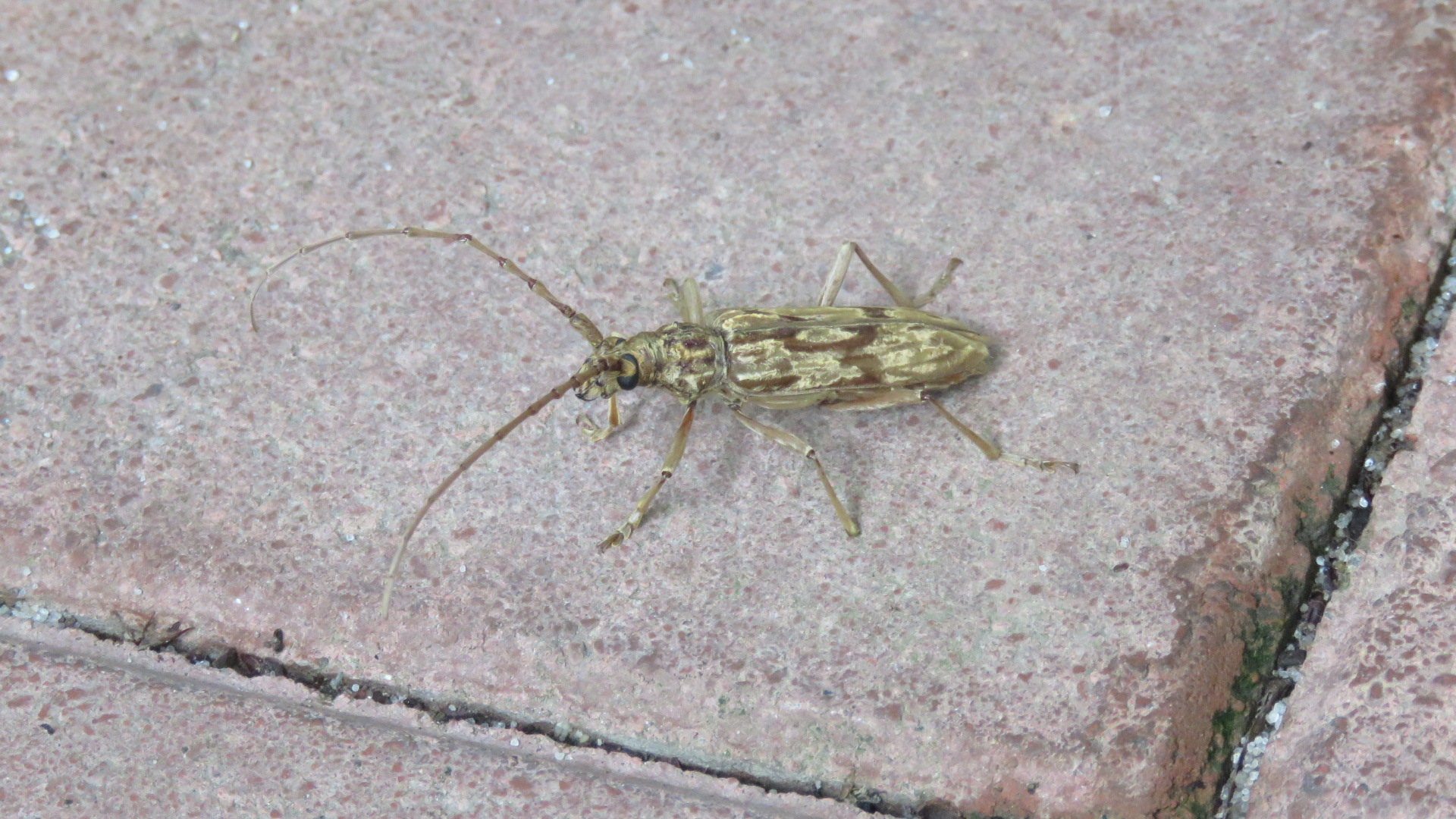
Aeolesthes chrysothrix

Pseudaeolesthes is a genus of longhorn beetles in the family Cerambycidae.

== Species ==
- Pseudaeolesthes aureopilosa (Gressitt & Rondon, 1970)
- Pseudaeolesthes chrysothrix (Bates, 1873)
- Pseudaeolesthes malayana (Hayashi, 1979)
- Pseudaeolesthes multistriata (Hayashi, 1979)
- Pseudaeolesthes mutabiliaurea Chiang, 1952
- Pseudaeolesthes psednothrix (Gressitt & Rondon, 1970)
- Pseudaeolesthes rufimembris (Pic, 1923)
