= Jupoata costalimai =

Scientific classification
- Domain: Eukaryota
- Kingdom: Animalia
- Phylum: Arthropoda
- Class: Insecta
- Order: Coleoptera
- Suborder: Polyphaga
- Infraorder: Cucujiformia
- Family: Cerambycidae
- Subfamily: Cerambycinae
- Tribe: Cerambycini
- Genus: Jupoata
- Species: J. costalimai

Binomial name
- Jupoata costalimai Zajciw, 1966

Synonyms
- Brasilianus costalimai Martins, 1979

Species of beetle

Jupoata costalimai is a species in the longhorn beetle family Cerambycidae. It is found in Paraguay, Brazil, and Bolivia.
