= Jupoata gigas =

Scientific classification
- Domain: Eukaryota
- Kingdom: Animalia
- Phylum: Arthropoda
- Class: Insecta
- Order: Coleoptera
- Suborder: Polyphaga
- Infraorder: Cucujiformia
- Family: Cerambycidae
- Subfamily: Cerambycinae
- Tribe: Cerambycini
- Genus: Jupoata
- Species: J. gigas

Binomial name
- Jupoata gigas Martins & Monné, 2002

Species of beetle

Jupoata gigas is a species in the longhorn beetle family Cerambycidae. It is found in French Guiana and Brazil.
