= Jupoata garbei =

Scientific classification
- Kingdom: Animalia
- Phylum: Arthropoda
- Class: Insecta
- Order: Coleoptera
- Suborder: Polyphaga
- Infraorder: Cucujiformia
- Family: Cerambycidae
- Subfamily: Cerambycinae
- Tribe: Cerambycini
- Genus: Jupoata
- Species: J. garbei

Binomial name
- Jupoata garbei (Melzer, 1922)

Synonyms
- Brasilianus garbei Biezanko & Bosq, 1956; Hamaticherus garbei Melzer, 1927

Species of beetle

Jupoata garbei is a species in the longhorn beetle family Cerambycidae. It is found in Brazil.
