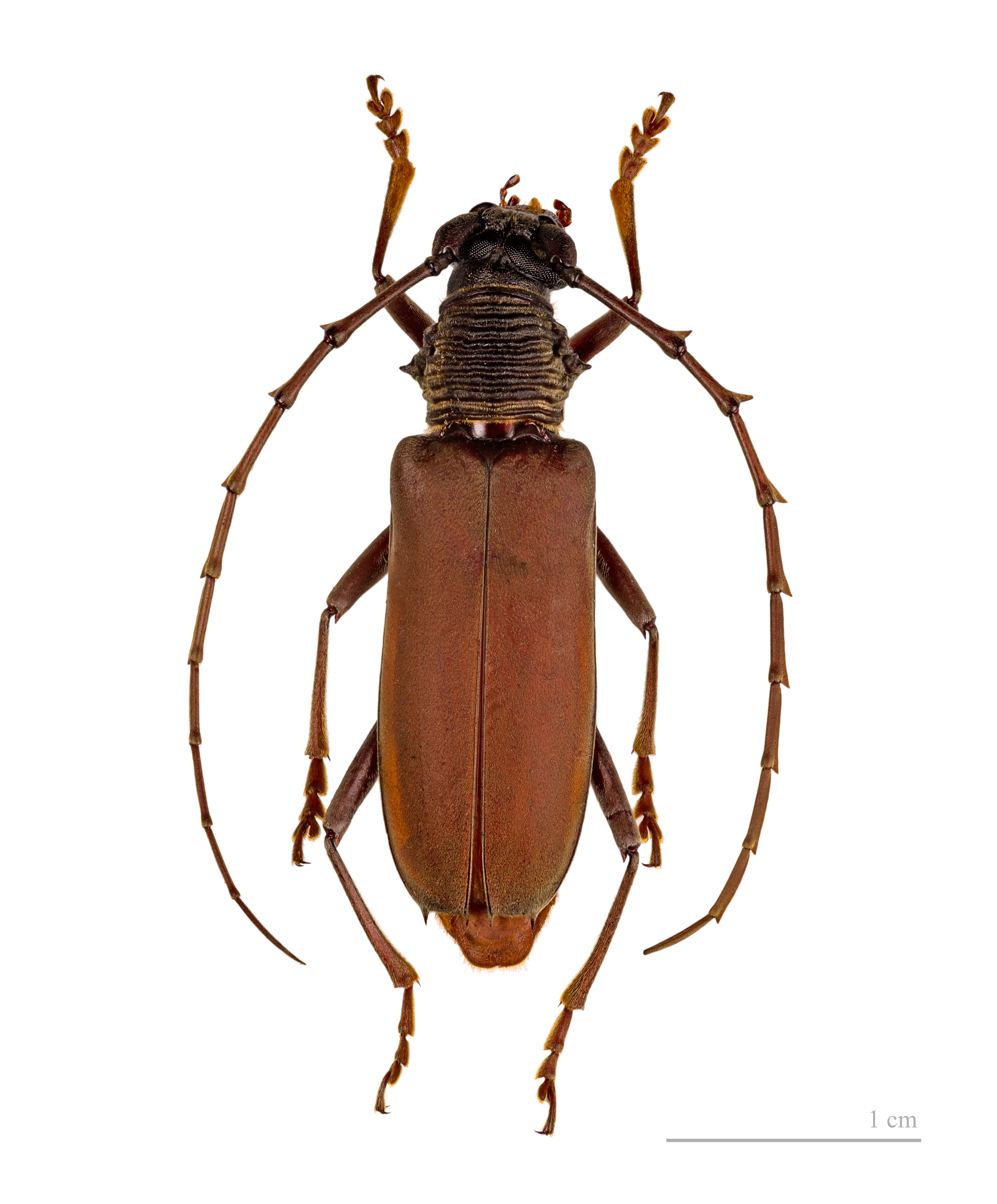
- Jupoata rufipennis

Scientific classification
- Domain: Eukaryota
- Kingdom: Animalia
- Phylum: Arthropoda
- Class: Insecta
- Order: Coleoptera
- Suborder: Polyphaga
- Infraorder: Cucujiformia
- Family: Cerambycidae
- Subfamily: Cerambycinae
- Tribe: Cerambycini
- Genus: Jupoata
- Species: J. rufipennis

Binomial name
- Jupoata rufipennis (Gory, 1831)

Synonyms
- Brasilianus plicatus Fisher, 1944; Brasilianus rufipennis Di Iorio, 1998; Cerambyx rufipennis Gray, 1832; Hamaticherus plicatus Williams, 1931; Hamaticherus rufipennis Gory, 1844; Hammatichaerus rufipennis Campos, 1921; Hammaticherus plicatus Brèthes, 1920; Hammatochaerus plicatus Costa, 1930; Juopata rufipennis Turnbow, Cave & Thomas, 2003; Jupoata rufispennis Giuglaris, 2012

= Jupoata rufipennis =

Species of beetle

Jupoata rufipennis is a species in the longhorn beetle family Cerambycidae. It is found in Central and South America.
