= Jupoata paraensis =

Scientific classification
- Domain: Eukaryota
- Kingdom: Animalia
- Phylum: Arthropoda
- Class: Insecta
- Order: Coleoptera
- Suborder: Polyphaga
- Infraorder: Cucujiformia
- Family: Cerambycidae
- Subfamily: Cerambycinae
- Tribe: Cerambycini
- Genus: Jupoata
- Species: J. paraensis

Binomial name
- Jupoata paraensis Martins & Monné, 2002

Species of beetle

Jupoata paraensis is a species in the longhorn beetle family Cerambycidae. It is found in Brazil.
