= Jupoata spinosa =

Scientific classification
- Domain: Eukaryota
- Kingdom: Animalia
- Phylum: Arthropoda
- Class: Insecta
- Order: Coleoptera
- Suborder: Polyphaga
- Infraorder: Cucujiformia
- Family: Cerambycidae
- Subfamily: Cerambycinae
- Tribe: Cerambycini
- Genus: Jupoata
- Species: J. spinosa

Binomial name
- Jupoata spinosa Martins & Galileo, 2008

Species of beetle

Jupoata spinosa is a species in the longhorn beetle family Cerambycidae. It is found in French Guiana.
