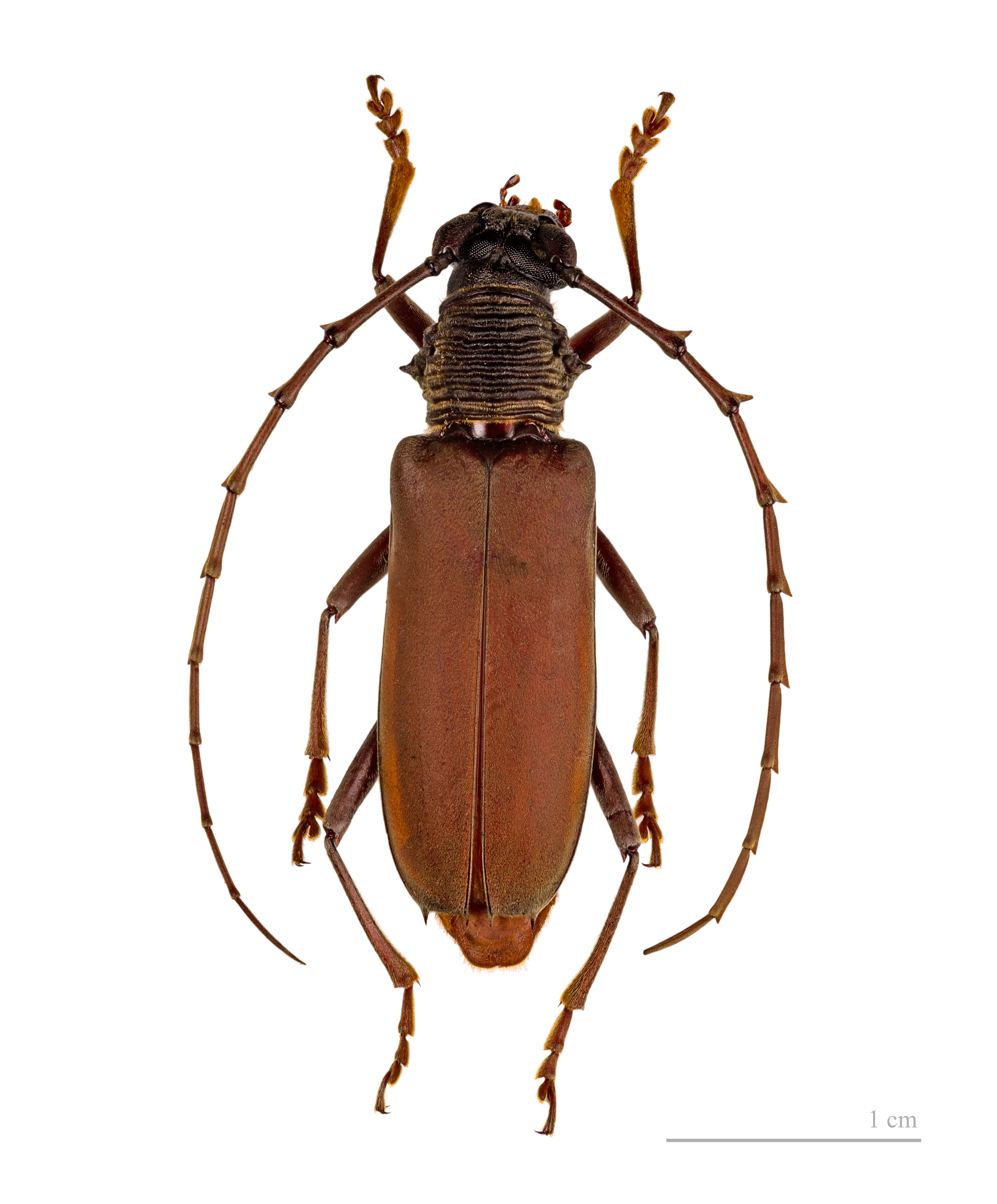
- Jupoata rufipennis female

Scientific classification
- Domain: Eukaryota
- Kingdom: Animalia
- Phylum: Arthropoda
- Class: Insecta
- Order: Coleoptera
- Suborder: Polyphaga
- Infraorder: Cucujiformia
- Family: Cerambycidae
- Subfamily: Cerambycinae
- Tribe: Cerambycini
- Genus: Jupoata; Martins & Monné, 2002

= Jupoata =

Genus of beetles

Jupoata is a genus of longhorn beetles in the family Cerambycidae. There are about 13 described species in Jupoata.

== Species ==
These 13 species belong to the genus Jupoata:

- Jupoata antonkozlovi Nascimento & Botero, 2018
- Jupoata brenesi Esteban-Durán & Martins, 2012 (Costa Rica)
- Jupoata costalimai Zajciw, 1966 (Paraguay, Brazil, and Bolivia)
- Jupoata divaricata Martins & Galileo, 2011 (Bolivia)
- Jupoata garbei (Melzer, 1922) (Brazil)
- Jupoata germana Martins, Galileo & Limeira-de-Oliveira, 2011 (Brazil)
- Jupoata gigas Martins & Monné, 2002 (French Guiana and Brazil)
- Jupoata jaechi Schmid, 2014 (Bolivia)
- Jupoata paraensis Martins & Monné, 2002 (Brazil)
- Jupoata peruviana Tippmann, 1960 (Peru)
- Jupoata robusta Martins & Monné, 2002 (Brazil and South America)
- Jupoata rufipennis (Gory, 1831) (Mexico, Central and South America)
- Jupoata spinosa Martins & Galileo, 2008 (French Guiana)
