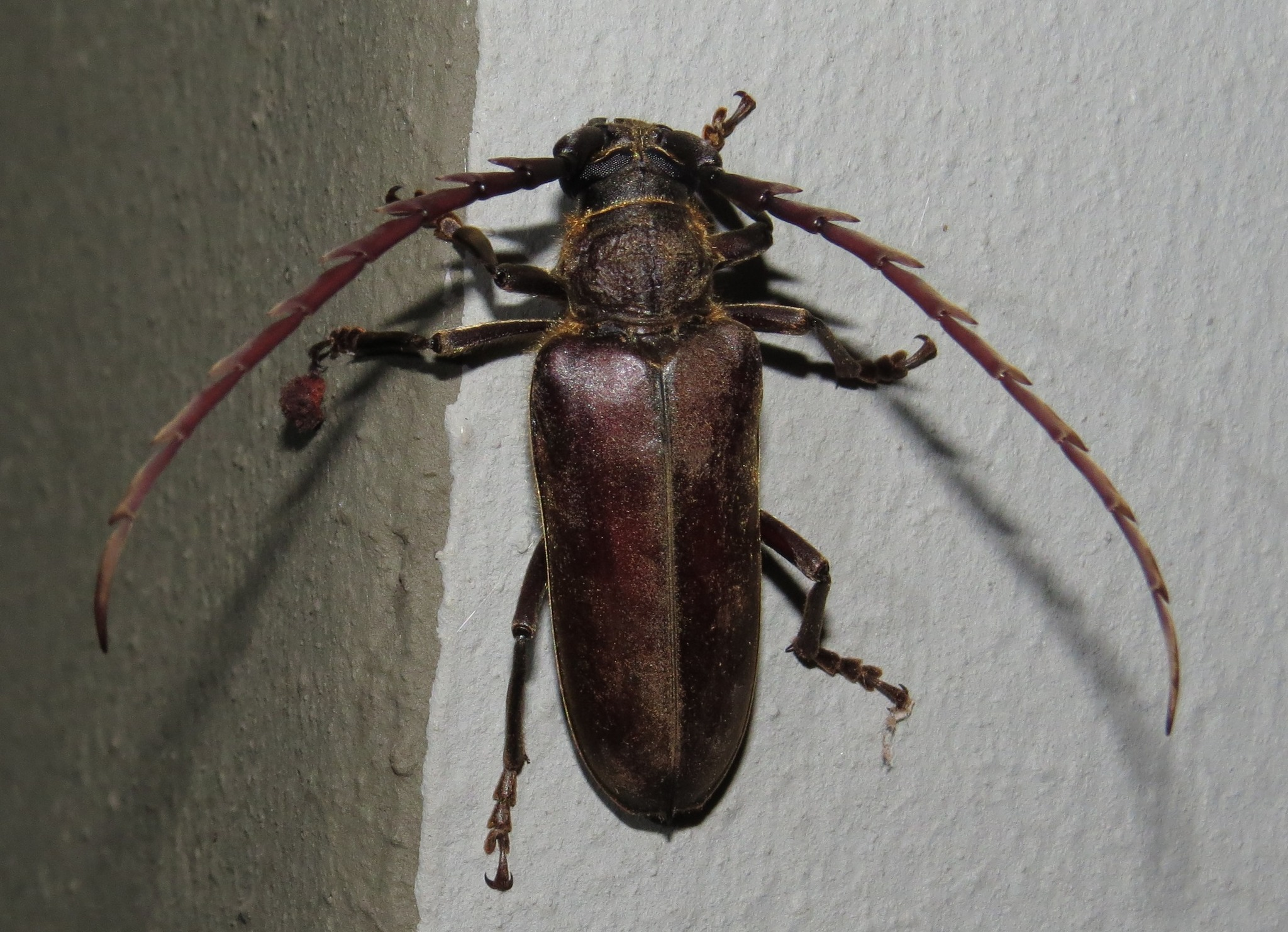
- Prosphilus serricornis, South Africa

Scientific classification
- Kingdom: Animalia
- Phylum: Arthropoda
- Class: Insecta
- Order: Coleoptera
- Suborder: Polyphaga
- Infraorder: Cucujiformia
- Family: Cerambycidae
- Subfamily: Cerambycinae
- Tribe: Cerambycini
- Subtribe: Cerambycina
- Genus: Prosphilus
- Species: P. serricornis

Binomial name
- Prosphilus serricornis (Dalman, 1817)

Synonyms
- Domitia pilosicollis (Hope, 1843); Hamaticherus pilosicollis Hope, 1843; Lamia serricornis Dalman, 1817; Prosphilus pilosicollis Thomson, 1864

= Prosphilus serricornis =

Species of beetle

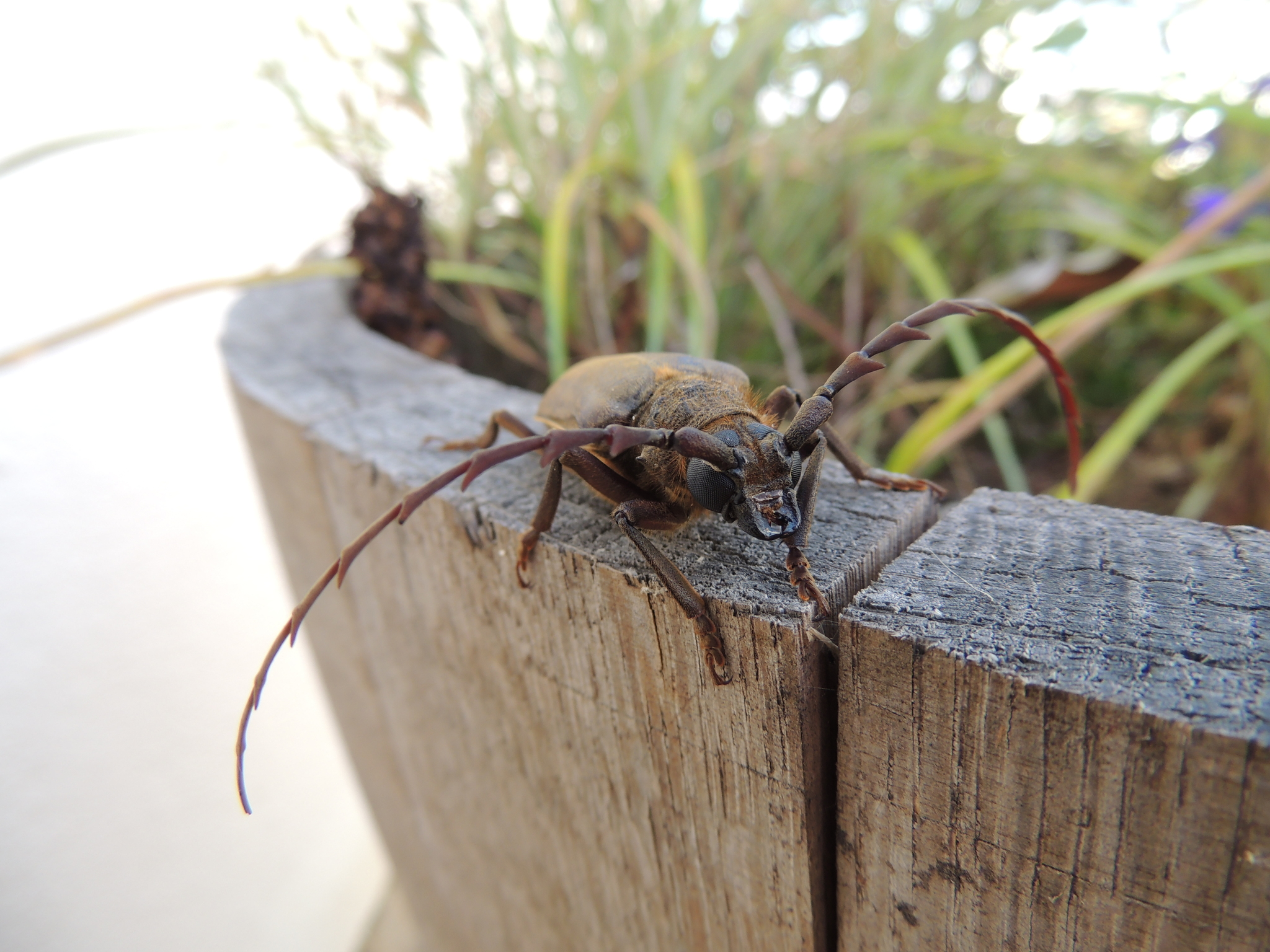
Prosphilus serricornis, South Africa

Prosphilus serricornis is a species of Long-Horned Beetle in the beetle family Cerambycidae. It is found in South Africa, Cameroon, and Liberia.
