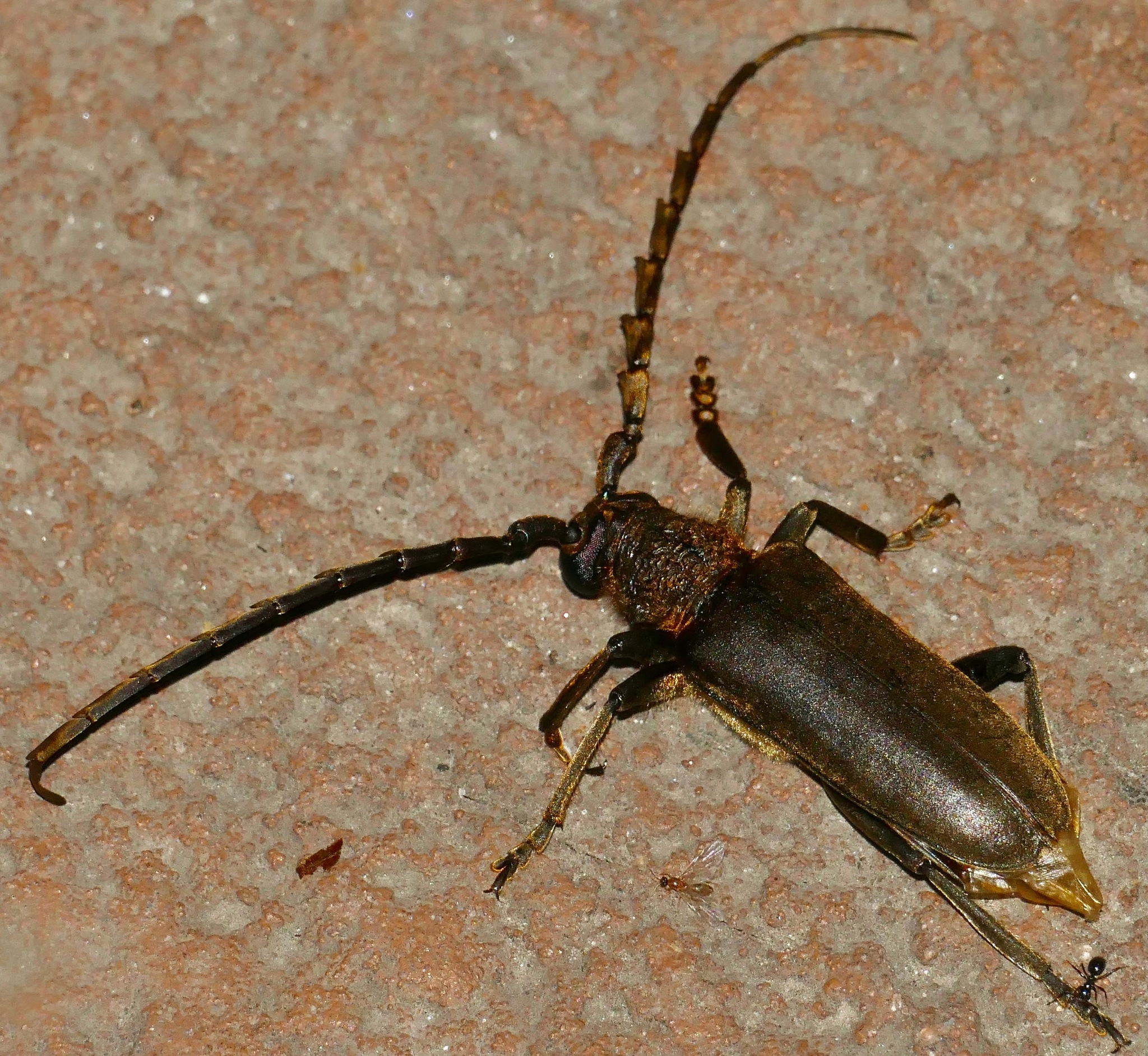
- Prosphilus serraticornis, South Africa

Scientific classification
- Domain: Eukaryota
- Kingdom: Animalia
- Phylum: Arthropoda
- Class: Insecta
- Order: Coleoptera
- Suborder: Polyphaga
- Infraorder: Cucujiformia
- Family: Cerambycidae
- Subfamily: Cerambycinae
- Tribe: Cerambycini
- Subtribe: Cerambycina
- Genus: Prosphilus; Thomson, 1864

= Prosphilus =

Genus of beetles

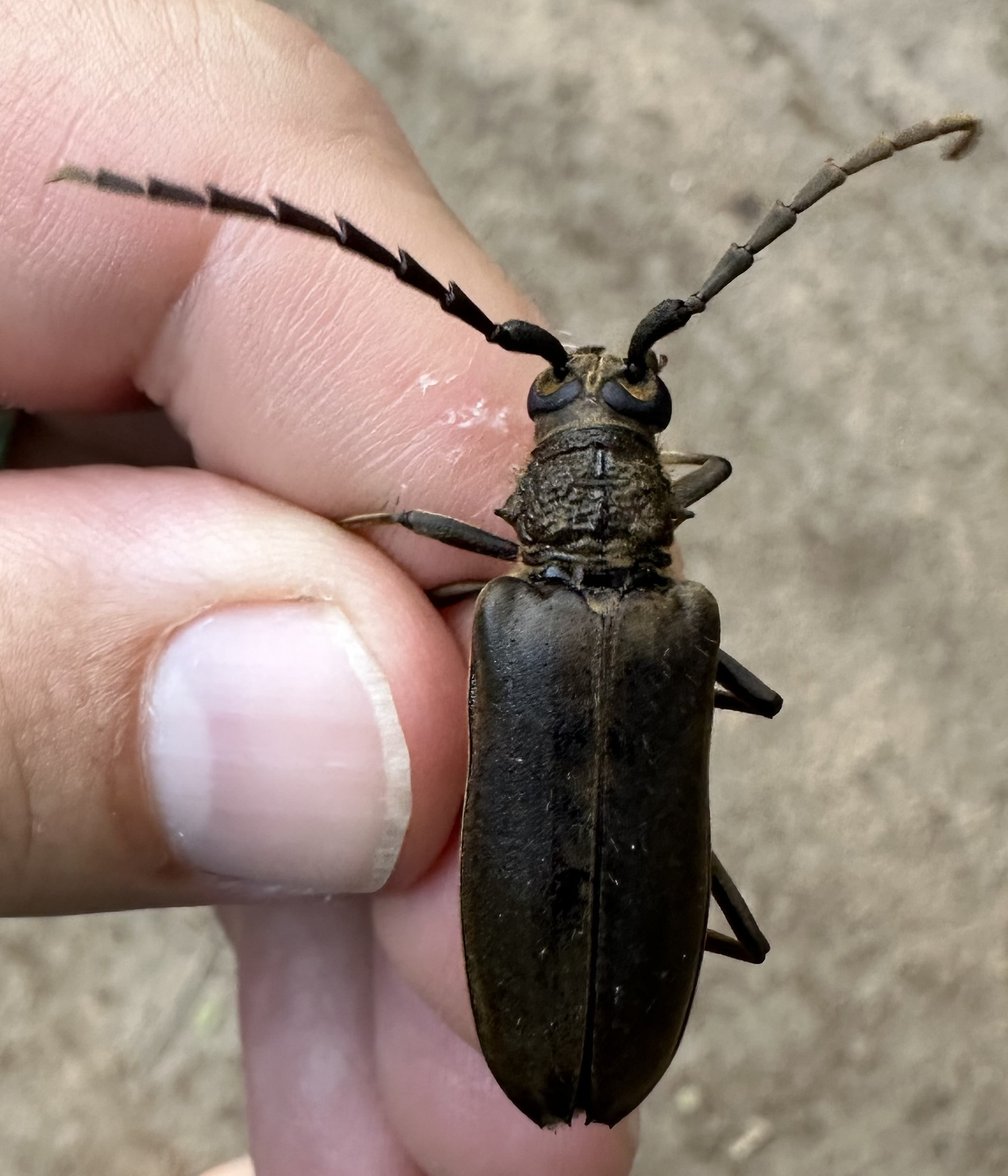
Prosphilus serraticornis, Botswana

Prosphilus is a genus of Long-Horned Beetles in the beetle family Cerambycidae. There are at least four described species in Prosphilus, found in Sub-Saharan Africa.

== Species ==
These four species belong to the genus Prosphilus:

- Prosphilus mourgliai Adlbauer, 1995 (Namibia)
- Prosphilus pectinicornis Corinta-Ferreira & Veiga-Ferreira, 1953 (South Africa)
- Prosphilus serraticornis (Bertoloni, 1855) (Sub-Saharan Africa)
- Prosphilus serricornis (Dalman, 1817) (South Africa, Cameroon, Liberia)
