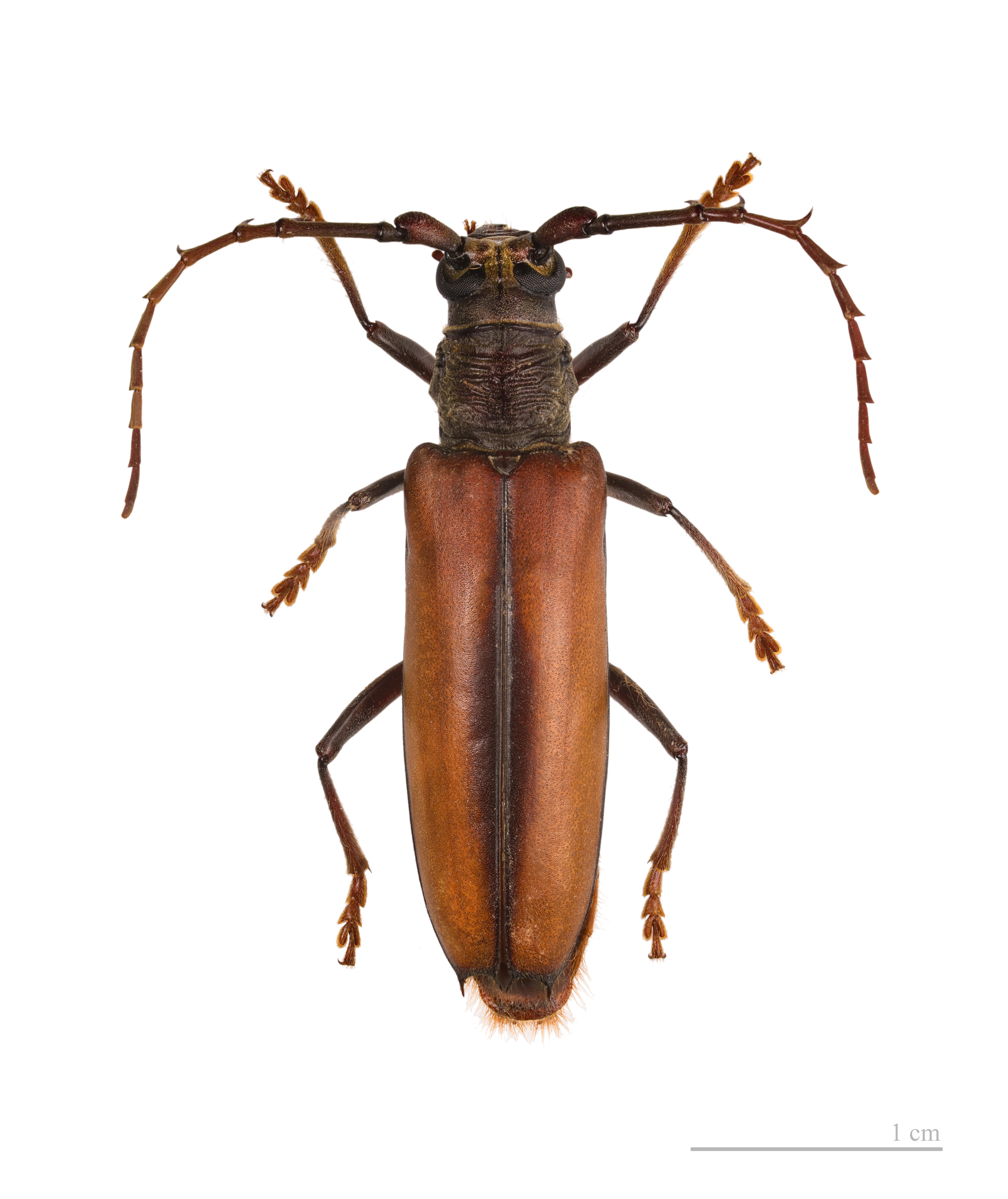

Scientific classification
- Kingdom: Animalia
- Phylum: Arthropoda
- Class: Insecta
- Order: Coleoptera
- Suborder: Polyphaga
- Infraorder: Cucujiformia
- Family: Cerambycidae
- Subfamily: Cerambycinae
- Tribe: Cerambycini
- Genus: Hirtobrasilianus
- Species: H. villiersi

Binomial name
- Hirtobrasilianus villiersi (Fragoso & Tavakilian, 1985)

Synonyms
- Brasilianus villiersi Monné & Giesbert, 1994

= Hirtobrasilianus villiersi =

Species of beetle

Hirtobrasilianus villiersi is a species in the longhorn beetle family Cerambycidae. It is found in Brazil, French Guiana, and Suriname.
