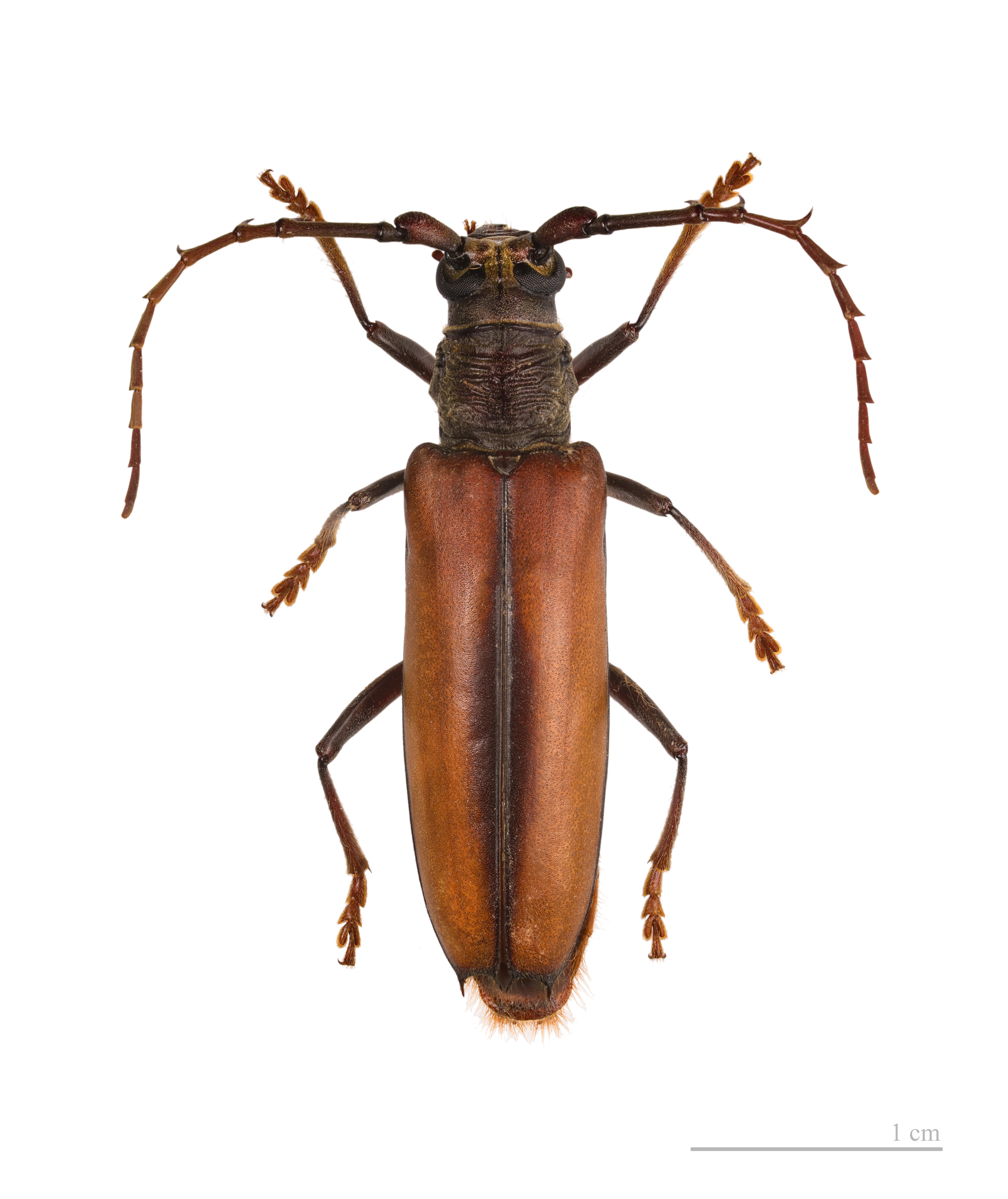
- Hirtobrasilianus villiersi

Scientific classification
- Kingdom: Animalia
- Phylum: Arthropoda
- Class: Insecta
- Order: Coleoptera
- Suborder: Polyphaga
- Infraorder: Cucujiformia
- Family: Cerambycidae
- Subfamily: Cerambycinae
- Tribe: Cerambycini
- Genus: Hirtobrasilianus; Fragoso & Tavakilian, 1985

= Hirtobrasilianus =

Genus of beetles

Hirtobrasilianus is a genus of Long-Horned Beetles in the beetle family Cerambycidae. There are at least three described species in Hirtobrasilianus.

== Species ==
These three species belong to the genus Hirtobrasilianus:

- Hirtobrasilianus matogrossensis (Fragoso, 1971) (Peru, French Guiana, Bolivia, and Brazil)
- Hirtobrasilianus seabrai (Fragoso & Tavakilian, 1985) (Peru, Venezuela, Ecuador, Brazil, and French Guiana)
- Hirtobrasilianus villiersi (Fragoso & Tavakilian, 1985) (Brazil, French Guiana, and Suriname)
