= Hirtobrasilianus matogrossensis =

Scientific classification
- Kingdom: Animalia
- Phylum: Arthropoda
- Class: Insecta
- Order: Coleoptera
- Suborder: Polyphaga
- Infraorder: Cucujiformia
- Family: Cerambycidae
- Subfamily: Cerambycinae
- Tribe: Cerambycini
- Genus: Hirtobrasilianus
- Species: H. matogrossensis

Binomial name
- Hirtobrasilianus matogrossensis (Fragoso, 1971)

Synonyms
- Brasilianus matogrossensis Monné & Giesbert, 1994; Macrobrasilianus matogrossensis Júlio, Giorgi & Monné, 2000

Species of beetle

Hirtobrasilianus matogrossensis is a species in the longhorn beetle family Cerambycidae. It is found in Peru, French Guiana, Bolivia, and Brazil.
