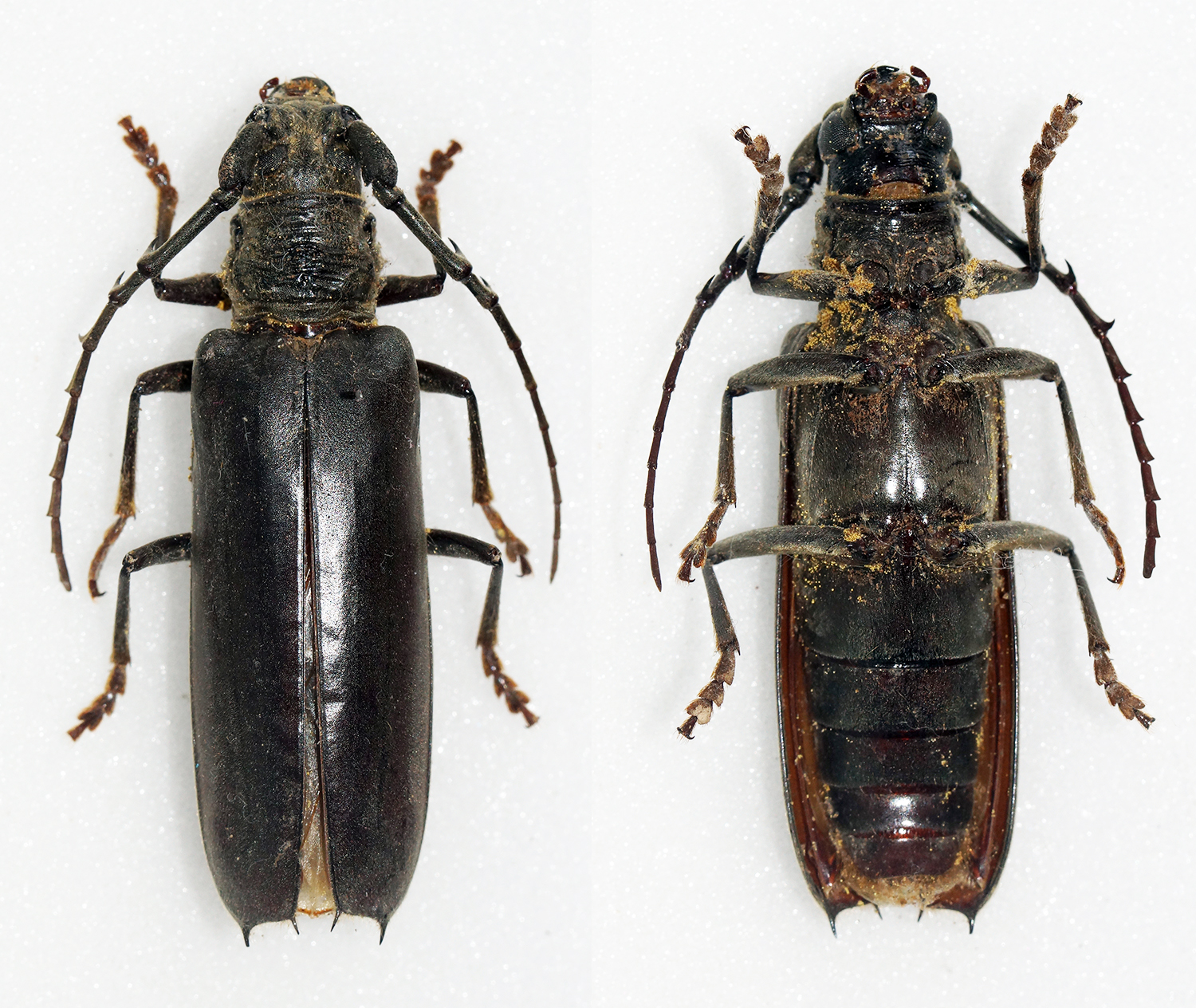

Scientific classification
- Kingdom: Animalia
- Phylum: Arthropoda
- Class: Insecta
- Order: Coleoptera
- Suborder: Polyphaga
- Infraorder: Cucujiformia
- Family: Cerambycidae
- Subfamily: Cerambycinae
- Tribe: Cerambycini
- Genus: Hirtobrasilianus
- Species: H. seabrai

Binomial name
- Hirtobrasilianus seabrai (Fragoso & Tavakilian, 1985)

Synonyms
- Brasilianus seabrai Fragoso & Tavakilian, 1985

= Hirtobrasilianus seabrai =

Species of beetle

Hirtobrasilianus seabrai is a species in the longhorn beetle family Cerambycidae. It is found in Peru, Venezuela, Ecuador, Brazil, and French Guiana.
