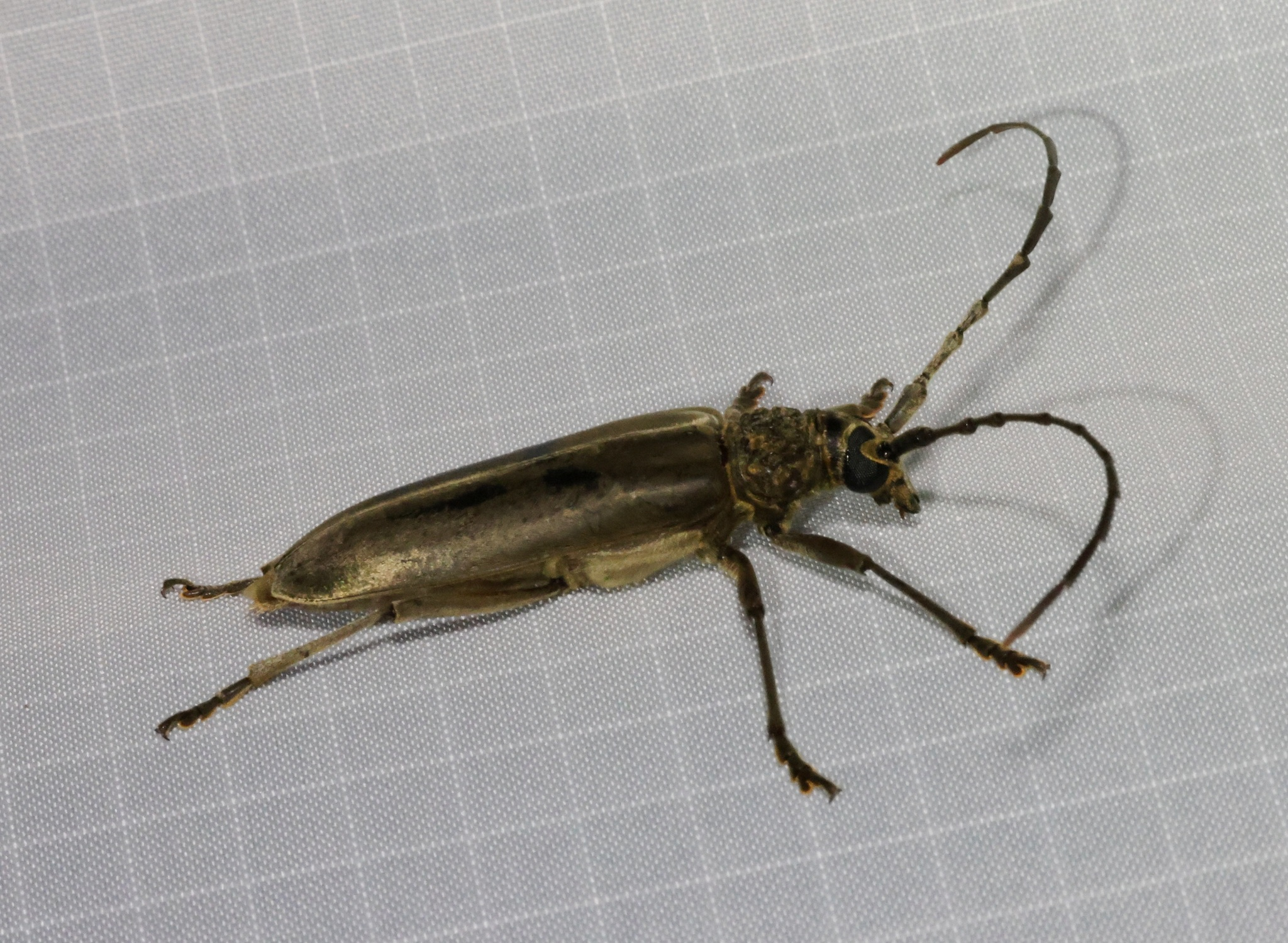
- Nadezhdiella cantori, China

Scientific classification
- Kingdom: Animalia
- Phylum: Arthropoda
- Clade: Pancrustacea
- Class: Insecta
- Order: Coleoptera
- Suborder: Polyphaga
- Infraorder: Cucujiformia
- Family: Cerambycidae
- Subfamily: Cerambycinae
- Tribe: Cerambycini
- Subtribe: Cerambycina
- Genus: Nadezhdiella
- Species: N. cantori

Binomial name
- Nadezhdiella cantori (Hope, 1842)

Synonyms
- Hamaticherus cantori Hope, 1843; Hammaticherus scabricollis Chevrolat, 1852; Cerambyx lucasi Brongniart, 1891

= Nadezhdiella cantori =

Species of beetle

Nadezhdiella cantori is a species of Long-Horned Beetle in the beetle family Cerambycidae. It is found in temperate Asia.

== Genomics ==
A chromosome-level genome assembly of Nadezhdiella cantori was published in 2026, representing the first reference genome for the species. The genome is approximately 737.7 Mb in size and comprises 10 pseudochromosomes. The assembly has a BUSCO completeness of 99.3% and contains 14,883 predicted protein-coding genes.
