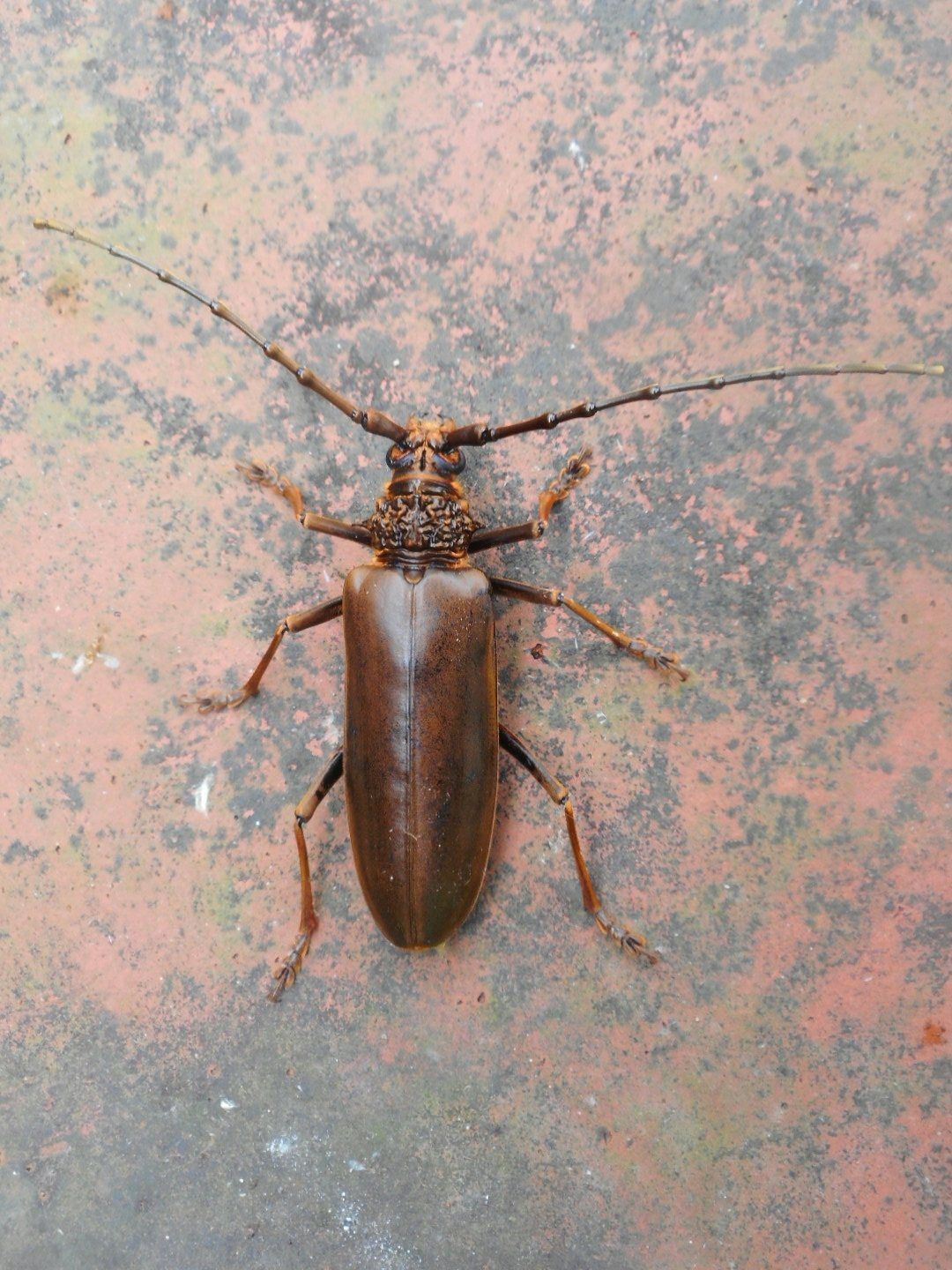
- Nadezhdiella fulvopubens, Vietnam

Scientific classification
- Domain: Eukaryota
- Kingdom: Animalia
- Phylum: Arthropoda
- Class: Insecta
- Order: Coleoptera
- Suborder: Polyphaga
- Infraorder: Cucujiformia
- Family: Cerambycidae
- Subfamily: Cerambycinae
- Tribe: Cerambycini
- Subtribe: Cerambycina
- Genus: Nadezhdiella; Plavilstshikov, 1931

Synonyms
- Nadhezdiella Gressitt, 1939

= Nadezhdiella =

Genus of beetles

Nadezhdiella is a genus of longhorn beetles in the family Cerambycidae. There are about five described species in Nadezhdiella.

== Species ==
These five species belong to the genus Nadezhdiella:

- Nadezhdiella cantori (Hope, 1842) (temperate Asia)
- Nadezhdiella fulvopubens (Pic, 1933) (China, Laos, Vietnam, and Thailand)
- Nadezhdiella hefferni Vitali, 2020
- Nadezhdiella japonica Hayashi, 1972 (Japan)
- Nadezhdiella spadix Holzschuh, 2005 (Malaysia and Borneo)
