= North Tenmile Lake =

Lake in Oregon, United States

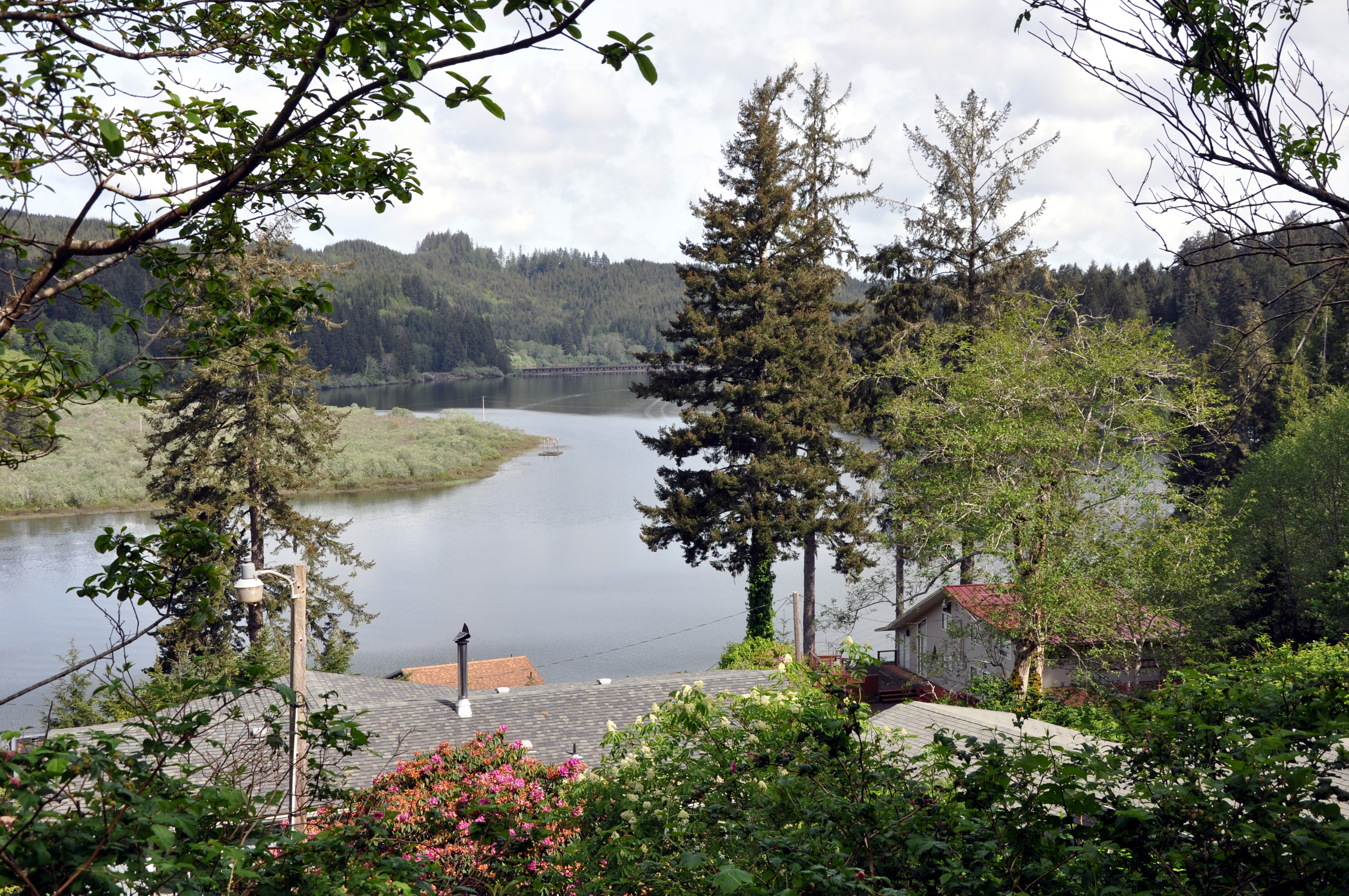
- North Tenmile Lake from North Lake Road east of Lakeside

- Location within Oregon Location within the United States
- Location: Douglas and Coos counties, near Lakeside
- Coordinates: 43°34′57″N 124°08′12″W
- Type: Natural, eutrophic
- Primary inflows: Small creeks
- Primary outflows: North Lake Canal to Tenmile Lake
- Catchment area: 29 square miles (75 km^{2})
- Basin countries: United States
- Surface area: 1,098 acres (444 ha)
- Average depth: 11 feet (3.4 m)
- Max. depth: 23 feet (7 m)
- Water volume: 12,100 acre-feet (14,900,000 m^{3})
- Residence time: 2 months
- Shore length^{1}: 19 miles (31 km)
- Surface elevation: 13 feet (4.0 m)
- Settlements: Reedsport, Lakeside
- ^{1} Shore length is not a well-defined measure.

North Tenmile Lake is one of a chain of lakes along the Oregon Coast south of the Umpqua River in the United States. The chain includes Tenmile, Eel, Clear, and smaller lakes, which drain into the Pacific Ocean via Tenmile Creek. The lake is 8 miles (13 km) south of Reedsport and 1 mile (1.6 km) east of U.S. Route 101 near the community of Lakeside. North Tenmile Lake is connected to Tenmile Lake by a navigable 0.5-mile (0.80 km) channel.

North Tenmile Lake is named after the creek, which is about 10 miles (16 km) south of Winchester Bay. This community, at the mouth of the Umpqua River, was the earliest pioneer village along this part of the coast.

== Geology and history ==
The lakes in the Tenmile Creek watershed formed after rising sea levels, driven by post-glacial warming, inundated the lower reaches of the creek and its tributaries. Sand dunes that later formed along the coast altered the region's drainage patterns and led to a string of lakes at varied elevations within the Tenmile basin.

In the early 20th century, North Tenmile Lake was a cold-water fishery that supported large populations of coastal cutthroat trout, salmon, and steelhead. However, the watershed was gradually altered by logging, farming, stream channeling, and the introduction of invasive fish species such as yellow perch and brown bullhead. Attempts to restore the cold-water fishery, including poisoning Eel, Tenmile and North Tenmile lakes with rotenone in 1968, all failed. Bluegill and largemouth bass are among species that have since dominated the fishery.

== Recreation ==
North Tenmile Lake and Tenmile Lake combined have been called "a premier largemouth bass fishery." In addition to largemouth bass, the shallow dendritic lakes with their complicated shorelines support populations of brown bullhead, bluegill, black crappie, coastal cutthroat trout, and stocked rainbow trout. Bass-catching tournaments are common at these lakes, and experts are able to catch 20 to 50 largemouth a day that weigh 2 to 5 pounds (0.9 to 2.3 kg).

The two lakes, connected by the North Lake Canal, are used for boating, waterskiing, and swimming, as well as fishing. In Lakeside, near the outlet of Tenmile Lake, Coos County manages Tenmile Lakes Park. It has boat ramps, docks, a fish-cleaning stand, picnic tables, horseshoe courts, restrooms, and other amenities. A campground in the park accommodates recreational vehicles (RVs) and tents.

== See also ==
- List of lakes in Oregon
