= Clear Lake (Douglas County, Oregon) =

Lake in Douglas County, Oregon, United States

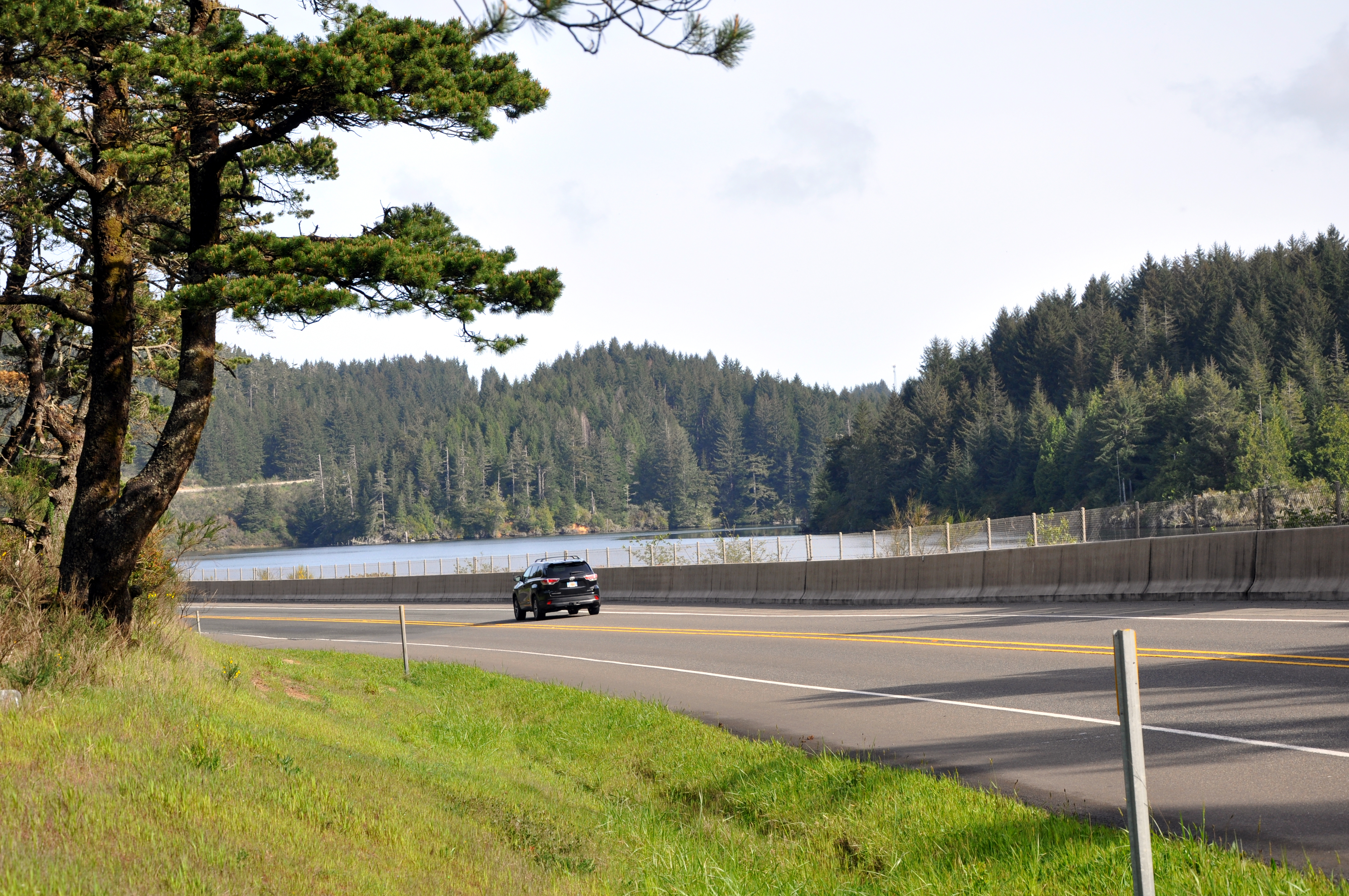
- Clear Lake, Douglas County from U.S. Route 101

- Location of Clear Lake in Oregon, USA. Clear Lake (the United States)
- Location: near Winchester Bay
- Coordinates: 43°38′37″N 124°10′57″W
- Lake type: Natural, oligotrophic
- Primary inflows: Small intermittent streams
- Primary outflows: Through Edna Lake and Clear Creek to Eel Lake
- Catchment area: 2 square miles (5.2 km^{2})
- Basin countries: United States
- Surface area: 317 acres (128 ha)
- Average depth: 54 feet (16 m)
- Max. depth: 119 feet (36 m)
- Water volume: 16,600 acre-feet (20,500,000 m^{3})
- Residence time: 2.7 years
- Shore length^{1}: 8.7 miles (14.0 km)
- Surface elevation: 233 feet (71 m)
- Settlements: Reedsport
- ^{1} Shore length is not a well-defined measure.

Clear Lake is a natural body of water impounded by sand dunes along the Oregon Coast of the Pacific Ocean in the United States. The lake is the municipal water supply for the city of Reedsport, which lies about 4 miles (6 km) northeast of the lake. Clear Lake is closed to public access to protect the purity of the water.

U.S. Route 101 runs north–south along the west side of the lake. The community of Winchester Bay is north of the lake; Umpqua Lighthouse State Park and the mouth of the Umpqua River are to the northwest, and Oregon Dunes National Recreation Area runs along the coast to the west. The outflow from Clear Lake is south to Edna Lake, Clear Creek, and Eel Lake.

Clear Lake, at 229 feet (70 m) above sea level, is the highest of several lakes formed by dunes encroaching on Clear Creek's ancestral valley. Water from this string of lakes, including Eel Lake and Tenmile Lake, flows generally south into Tenmile Creek in Coos County, which flows west into the Pacific near the community of Lakeside.

== See also ==
- List of lakes in Oregon
