= Tenmile Creek (Coos County, Oregon) =

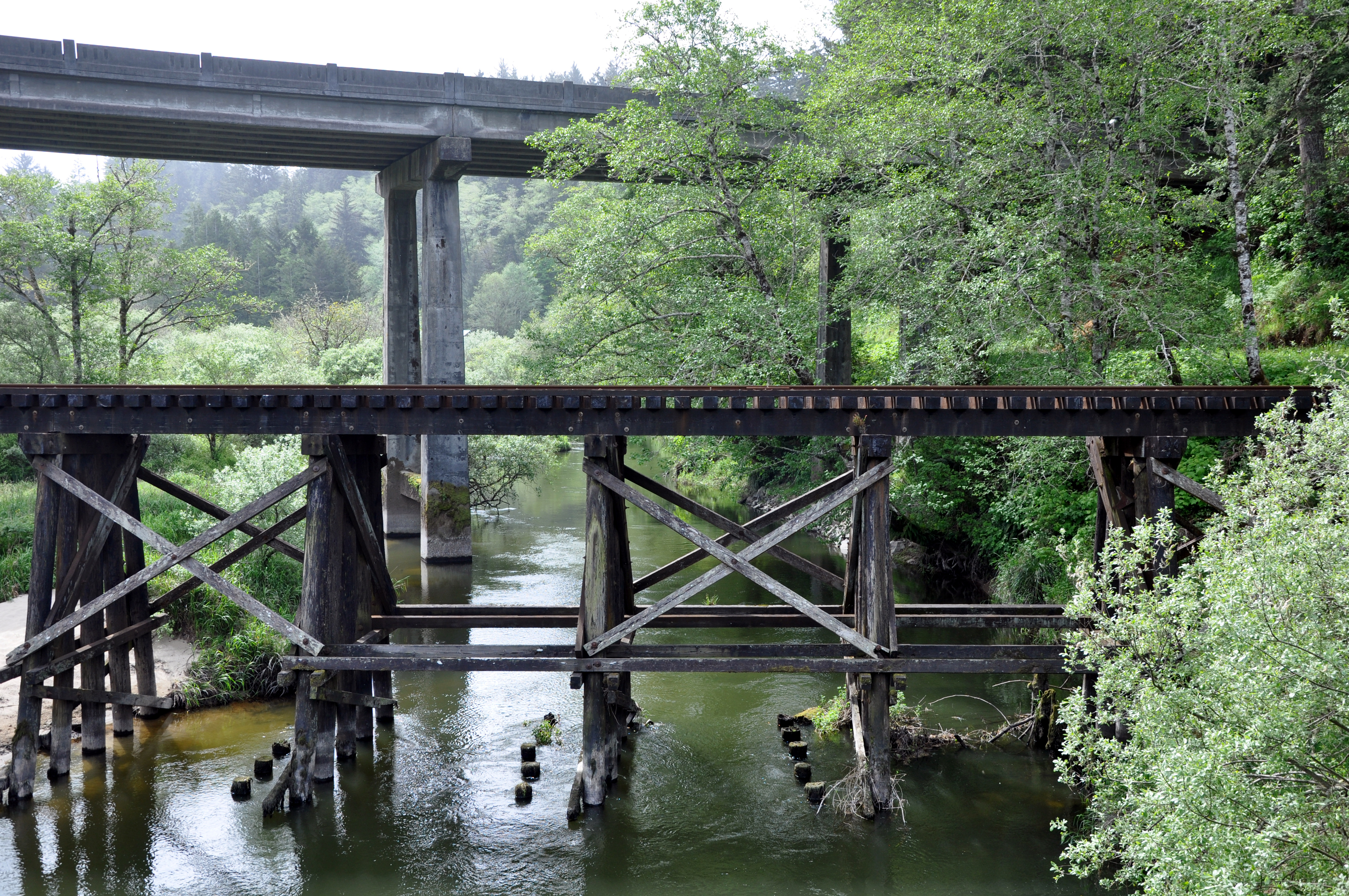
- The creek passes under U.S. Route 101 and a railway trestle after leaving Tenmile Lake.

- Location of the mouth of Tenmile Creek in Oregon

Location
- Country: United States
- State: Oregon
- County: Coos

Physical characteristics
- Source: Tenmile Lake
  - location: Lakeside
  - coordinates: 43°34′24″N 124°10′24″W
  - elevation: 14 ft (4.3 m)
- Mouth: Pacific Ocean
  - coordinates: 43°33′42″N 124°13′55″W
  - elevation: 3 ft (0.91 m)
- Length: 3 mi (4.8 km)

Tenmile Creek is the outlet for a chain of lakes ending at Tenmile Lake near Lakeside in Coos County in the U.S. state of Oregon. The creek flows generally west for about 3 miles (5 km) from the lake to the Pacific Ocean. The stream's name stems from its approximate distance from Winchester Bay, the earliest pioneer village along this part of the coast.

== Course ==
Tenmile Creek meanders generally west from its source at Lakeside, which is on the creek's right bank. Slightly west of town, the creek enters the Siuslaw National Forest, then passes under U.S. Route 101. Just beyond the highway, Eel Creek, the outlet from Eel Lake, enters from the right. Turning south parallel to the highway, which is on its left, Tenmile Creek arrives at Spinreel Campground, where Saunders Creek enters from the left. Turning northwest, Tenmile Creek enters Oregon Dunes National Recreation Area, through which it meanders until reaching the ocean.

== Geology and geography ==
Tenmile Lake is the largest and southernmost of a chain of lakes that formed behind a ridge of dunes along the Oregon Coast south of the Umpqua River. The lakes developed after rising sea levels, driven by post-glacial warming, drowned the lower reaches of ancestral Tenmile Creek and its tributaries. Sand dunes later blocked the streams and helped produce lakes at varied elevations within the Tenmile drainage basin. Other large lakes in the chain are, from north to south, Clear, Eel, and North Tenmile. All drain toward Lakeside, about 8 miles (13 km) south of Reedsport and 0.5 miles (0.8 km) east of U.S. Route 101

== Recreation ==
The United States Forest Service manages Spinreel Campground, near the confluence of Tenmile and Saunders Creek and the edge of the dunes. Spinreel has a boat ramp for non-motorized boats and a staging area for dune buggies. Activities at the campground include fishing for steelhead (sea-run rainbow trout), picnicking, and recreational vehicle (RV) camping.

== See also ==
- List of rivers of Oregon
