= Tenmile Lake (Oregon) =

Lake in Coos County, Oregon, United States

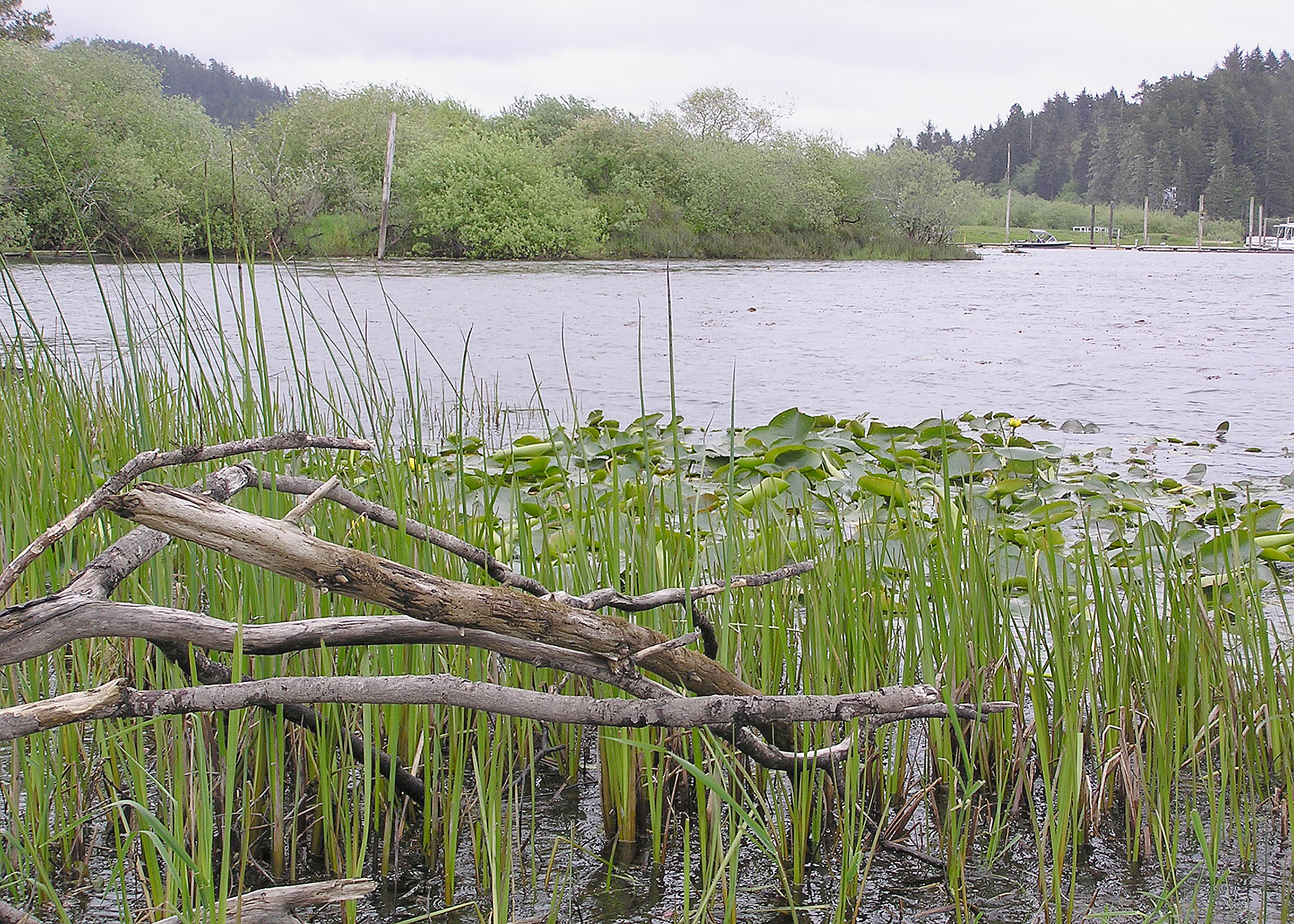
- Grasses and water lilies at Tenmile Lake

- Location within Oregon Location within the United States
- Location: Lakeside, Coos County, Oregon
- Coordinates: 43°33′21″N 124°08′30″W
- Type: Natural, eutrophic
- Primary inflows: North Tenmile Lake; Shutter, Adams, Johnson, Benson creeks
- Primary outflows: Tenmile Creek
- Catchment area: 70 square miles (180 km^{2})
- Basin countries: United States
- Surface area: 1,627 acres (658 ha)
- Average depth: 10 feet (3.0 m)
- Max. depth: 22 feet (6.7 m)
- Water volume: 16,200 acre-feet (20,000,000 m^{3})
- Residence time: 1 month
- Shore length^{1}: 23 miles (37 km)
- Surface elevation: 13 feet (4.0 m)
- Settlements: Reedsport, Lakeside
- ^{1} Shore length is not a well-defined measure.

Tenmile Lake is the largest and southernmost of a chain of lakes along the Oregon Coast south of the Umpqua River in the United States. The chain includes North Tenmile, Eel, Clear, and smaller lakes, which drain into the Pacific Ocean via Tenmile Creek. The lake is 8 miles (13 km) south of Reedsport and 0.5 miles (0.80 km) east of U.S. Route 101 near the community of Lakeside.

Tenmile Lake is named after the creek, which is about 10 miles (16 km) south of Winchester Bay. This community, at the mouth of the Umpqua River, was the earliest pioneer village along this part of the coast. Although the lake's official name is Tenmile Lake, it was formerly called Johnson Lake and South Tenmile Lake.

== Geology and history ==
The lakes in the Tenmile Creek watershed formed after rising sea levels, driven by post-glacial warming, inundated the lower reaches of the creek and its tributaries. Sand dunes that later formed along the coast altered the region's drainage patterns and led to a string of lakes at varied elevations within the Tenmile basin.

In the early 20th century, Tenmile Lake was a cold-water fishery that supported large populations of coastal cutthroat trout, salmon, and the sea-run steelhead. However, the watershed was gradually altered by logging, farming, stream channeling, and the introduction of invasive fish species such as yellow perch and brown bullhead. Attempts to restore the cold-water fishery, including poisoning Eel, Tenmile and North Tenmile lakes with rotenone in 1968, all failed. Bluegill and largemouth bass are among species that have since dominated the fishery.

== Recreation ==
Tenmile Lake and North Tenmile Lake combined have been called "a premier largemouth bass fishery." In addition to largemouth bass, the shallow dendritic lakes with their complicated shorelines support populations of brown bullhead, bluegill, black crappie, coastal cutthroat trout, and stocked rainbow trout. Bass-catching tournaments are common at these lakes, and experts are able to catch 20 to 50 largemouth a day that weigh 2 to 5 pounds (0.9 to 2.3 kg).

The two lakes, connected by the North Lake Canal, are used for boating, waterskiing, and swimming, as well as fishing. In Lakeside, near the outlet of Tenmile Lake, Coos County manages Tenmile Lakes Park. It has boat ramps, docks, a fish-cleaning stand, picnic tables, horseshoe courts, restrooms, and other amenities. A campground in the park accommodates recreational vehicles (RVs) and tents.

== See also ==
- List of lakes in Oregon
