= Eel Lake =

Lake in Oregon, United States

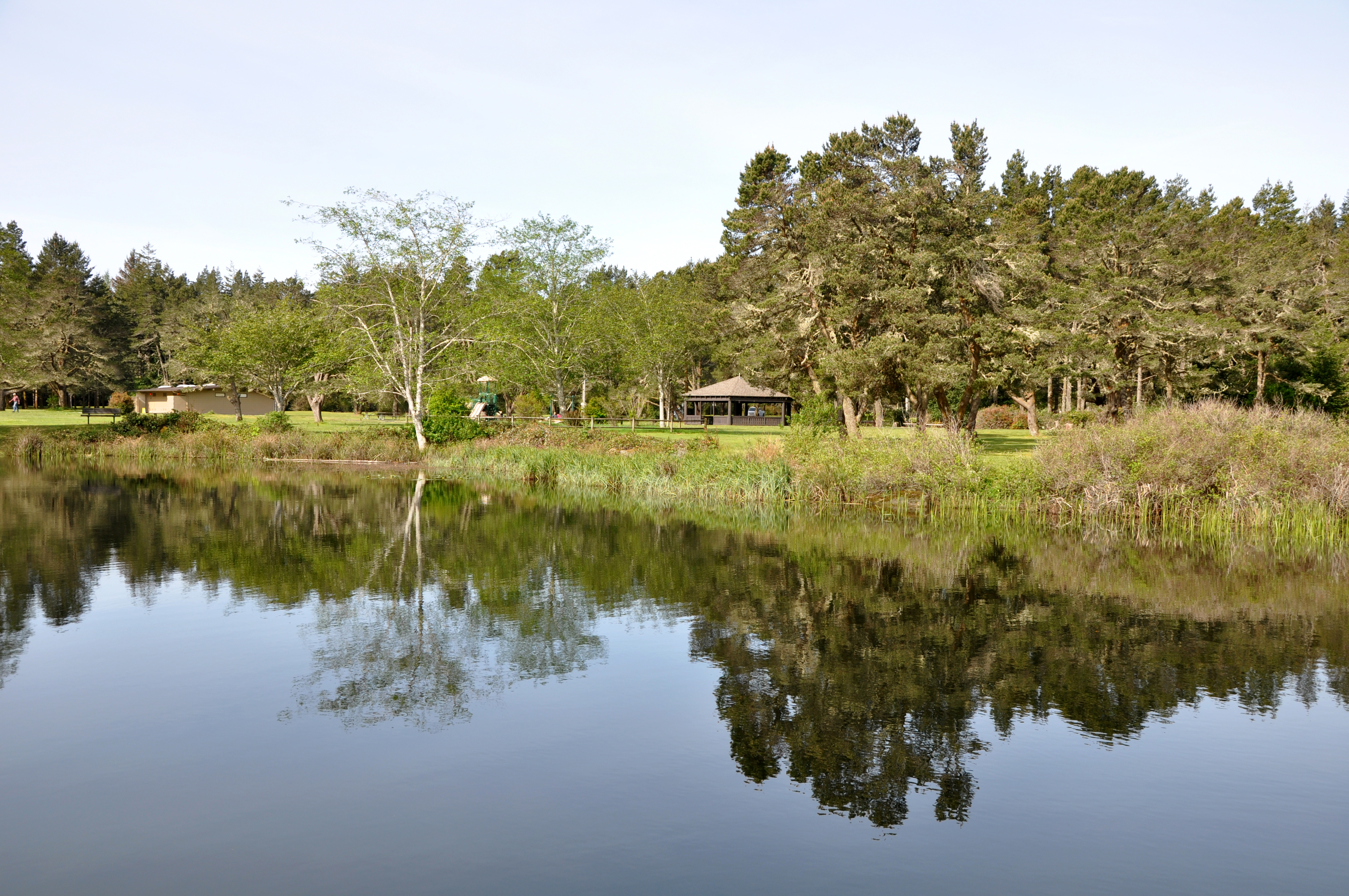
- Eel Lake at William M. Tugman State Park

- Location within Oregon Location within the United States
- Location: Oregon Coast, Douglas and Coos counties
- Coordinates: 43°36′08″N 124°10′29″W
- Lake type: Natural, mesotrophic
- Primary inflows: Clear, Eel, and Marsh creeks
- Primary outflows: Eel Creek
- Catchment area: 10 square miles (26 km^{2})
- Basin countries: United States
- Surface area: 355 acres (144 ha)
- Average depth: 34 feet (10 m)
- Max. depth: 65 feet (20 m)
- Water volume: 12,200 acre-feet (15.0×10^{6} m^{3})
- Residence time: 6 months
- Shore length^{1}: 11.5 miles (18.5 km)
- Surface elevation: 66 feet (20 m)
- Settlements: Reedsport, Lakeside
- ^{1} Shore length is not a well-defined measure.

Eel Lake is a large, deep lake in a chain of water bodies along the Oregon Coast south of the Umpqua River in the United States. The chain includes other large lakes—Clear, North Tenmile, and Tenmile—as well as smaller lakes, which drain into the Pacific Ocean via Tenmile Creek.

Eel Lake is about 7 miles (11 km) south of Reedsport, east of U.S. Route 101 and north of Lakeside. Steep slopes of the Oregon Coast Range border Eel Lake on the east. William M. Tugman State Park borders the lake on the west, and Oregon Dunes National Recreation Area is less than 1 mile (1.6 km) further west.

Clear Lake, to the north, drains into the west side of Eel Lake via Clear Creek as do the smaller lakes Edna, Teal, Schuttpelz , and Hall. Water exits Eel Lake via Eel Creek, a tributary of Tenmile Creek. Eel Lake is the source of drinking water for about 1,200 people in and near Lakeside.

== Geology ==
The lakes in the Tenmile Creek watershed formed after rising sea levels, driven by post-glacial warming, inundated the lower reaches of the creek and its tributaries. Sand dunes that later formed along the coast altered the region's drainage patterns and led to a string of lakes at varied elevations within the Tenmile basin.

== Recreation ==
William M. Tugman State Park surrounds the western arm of Eel Lake. It has 94 campsites for recreational vehicles (RVs) as well as 16 yurts for hikers and bikers; a day-use area, a boat ramp, a fishing dock, and a hiking trail. Activities on or near the lake include fishing, swimming, boating, and wildlife watching. The lake supports populations of largemouth bass, crappie, stocked rainbow trout, bluegill, steelhead (sea-run rainbow trout), and Coho salmon, the latter of which must be released if caught.

== Gallery ==
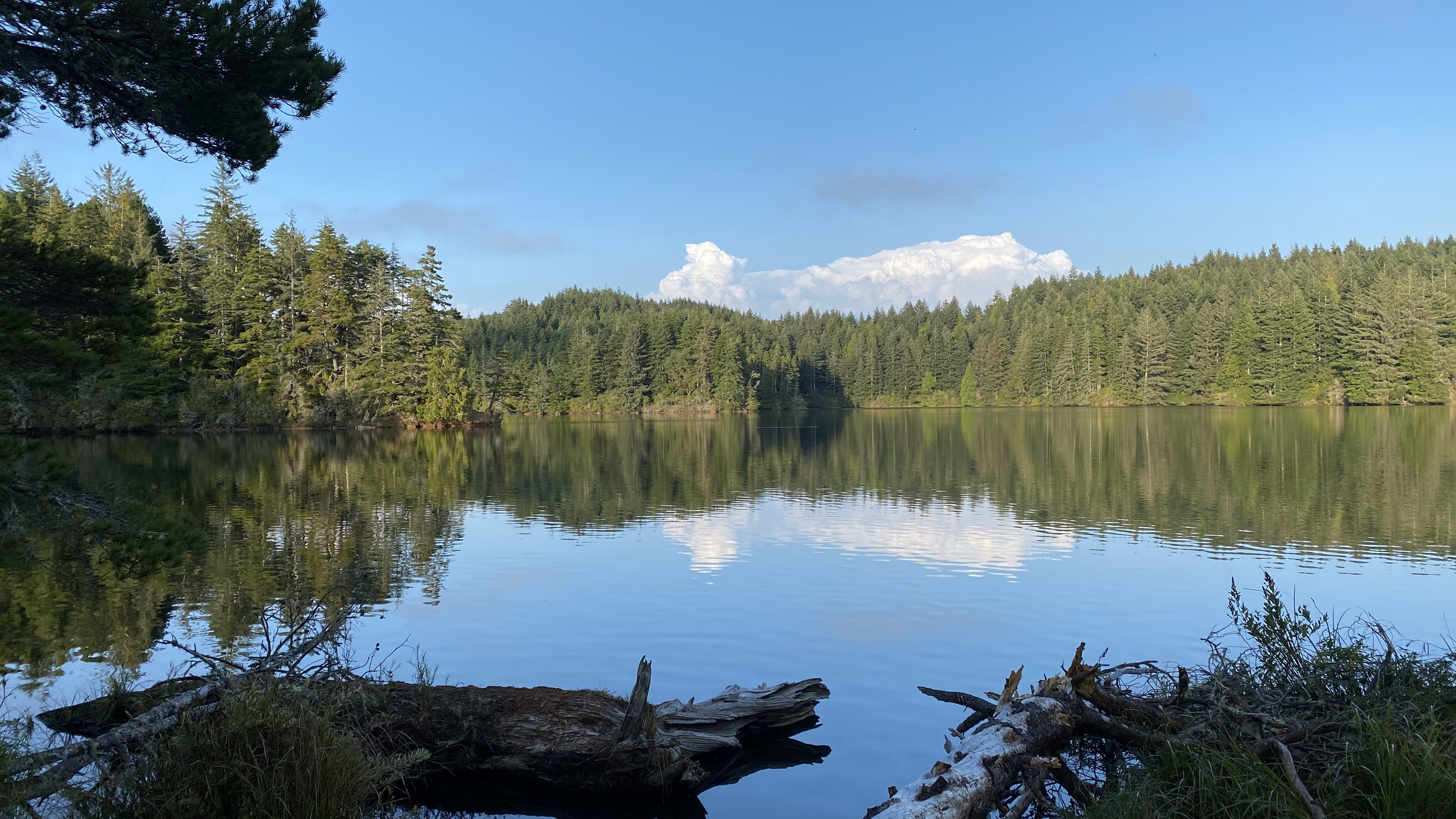
Eel Lake

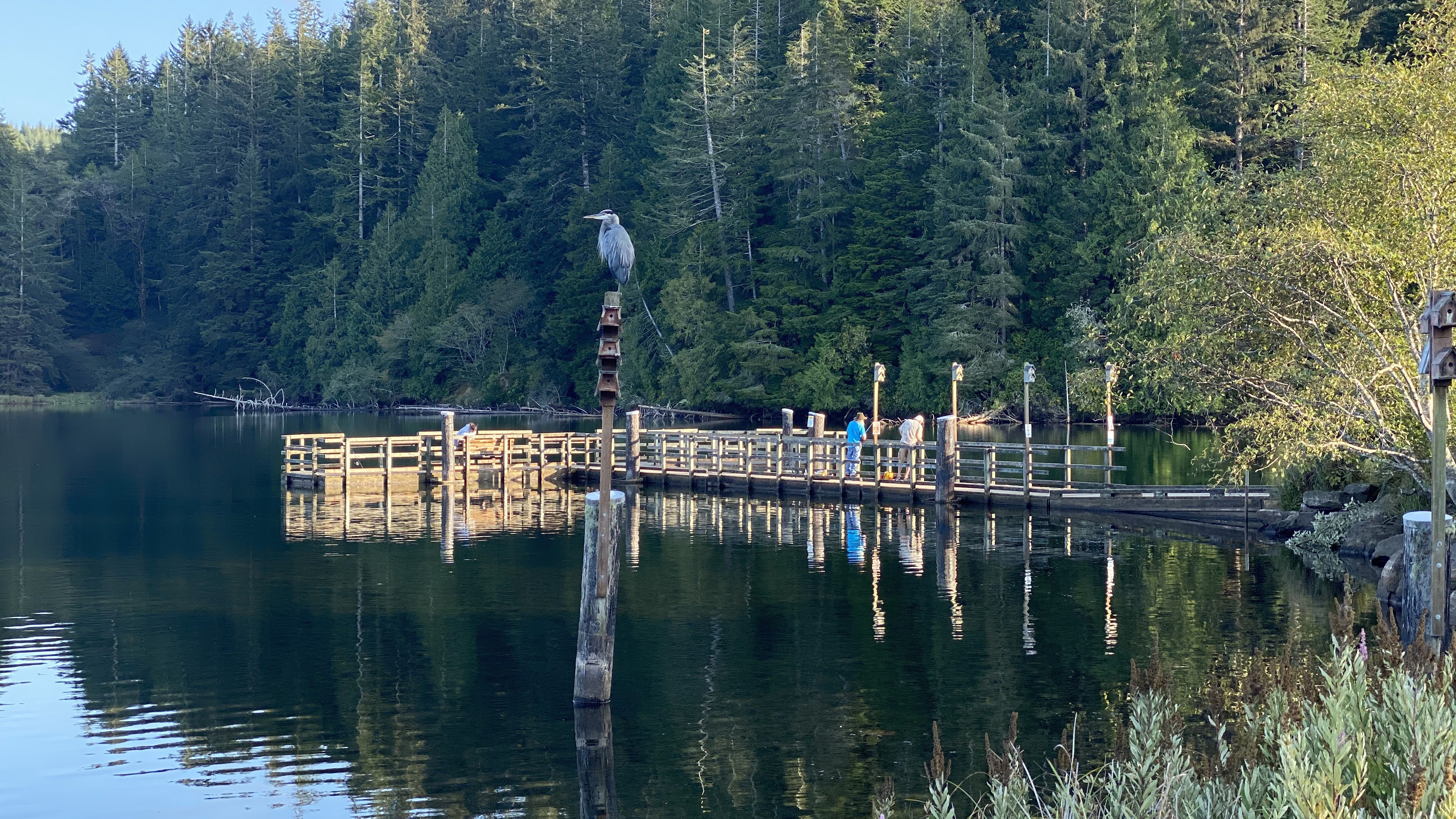
Fishing dock at Eel Lake

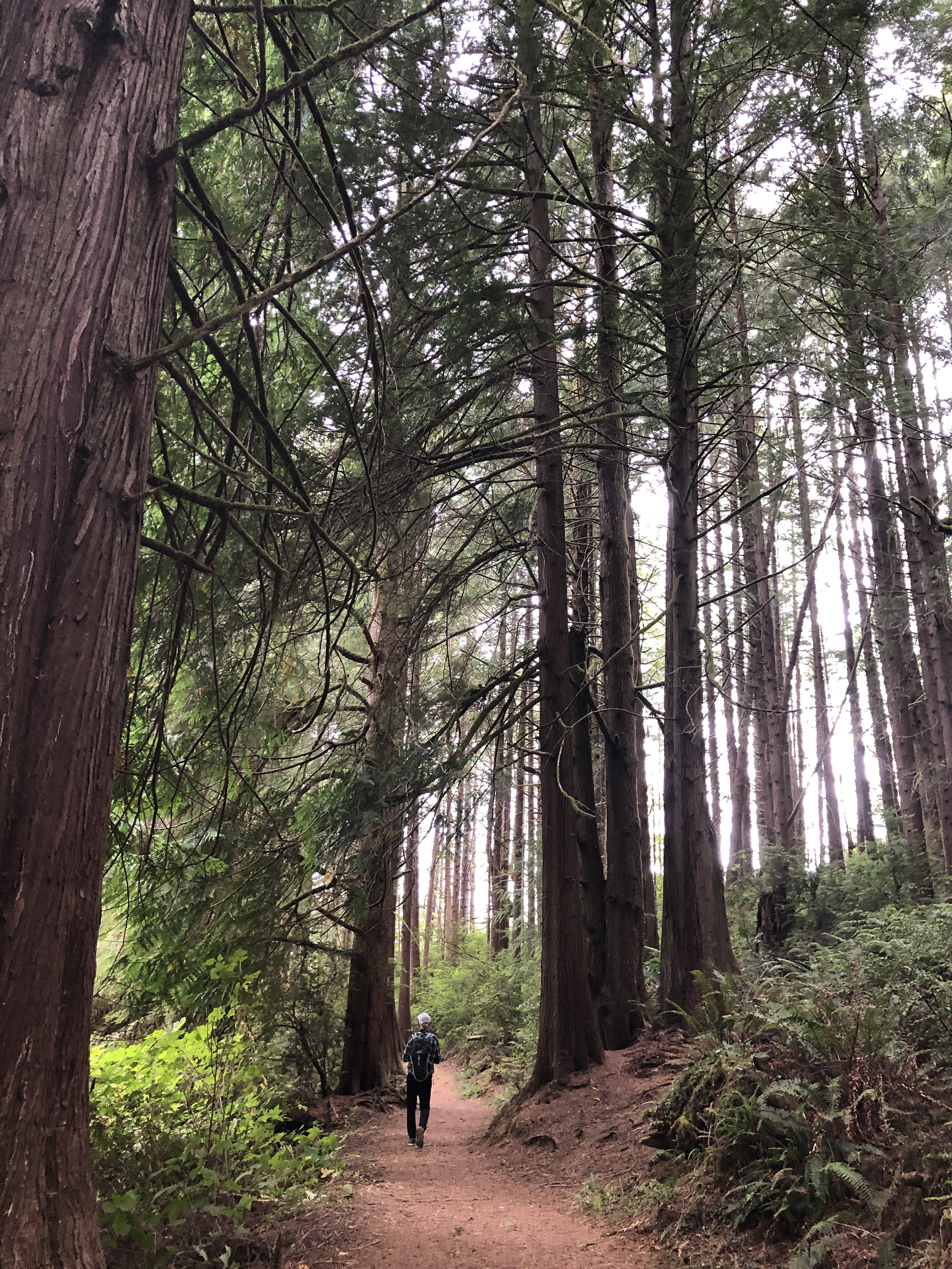
Hiking trail along S. shore of Eel Lake

== See also ==
List of lakes in Oregon
