= Ash, Oregon =

Unincorporated community in the state of Oregon, United States

Coordinates: 43°33′08″N 123°49′18″W

Ash is an unincorporated community in Douglas County, Oregon, United States, south of Loon Lake in the Southern Oregon Coast Range. The community is also referred to as Ash Valley.

Ash had a post office established in 1894, named for the Ash trees in the area. The first postmaster, Charles L. Parker, suggested "Ash" when the Post Office Department requested a short name. The post office was closed in 1934.

Ash Valley's economy is based primarily on logging and agriculture. The closest town is Scottsburg, 21 miles northeast, but Ash Valley residents rely on Reedsport, 27 miles northwest on the Oregon Coast, to obtain goods and services. In 1915, Ash had a cheese factory and a sawmill.

Ash Valley school was closed in 1994; students attend the public schools in Reedsport.
