= William M. Tugman State Park =

State park in Oregon, United States

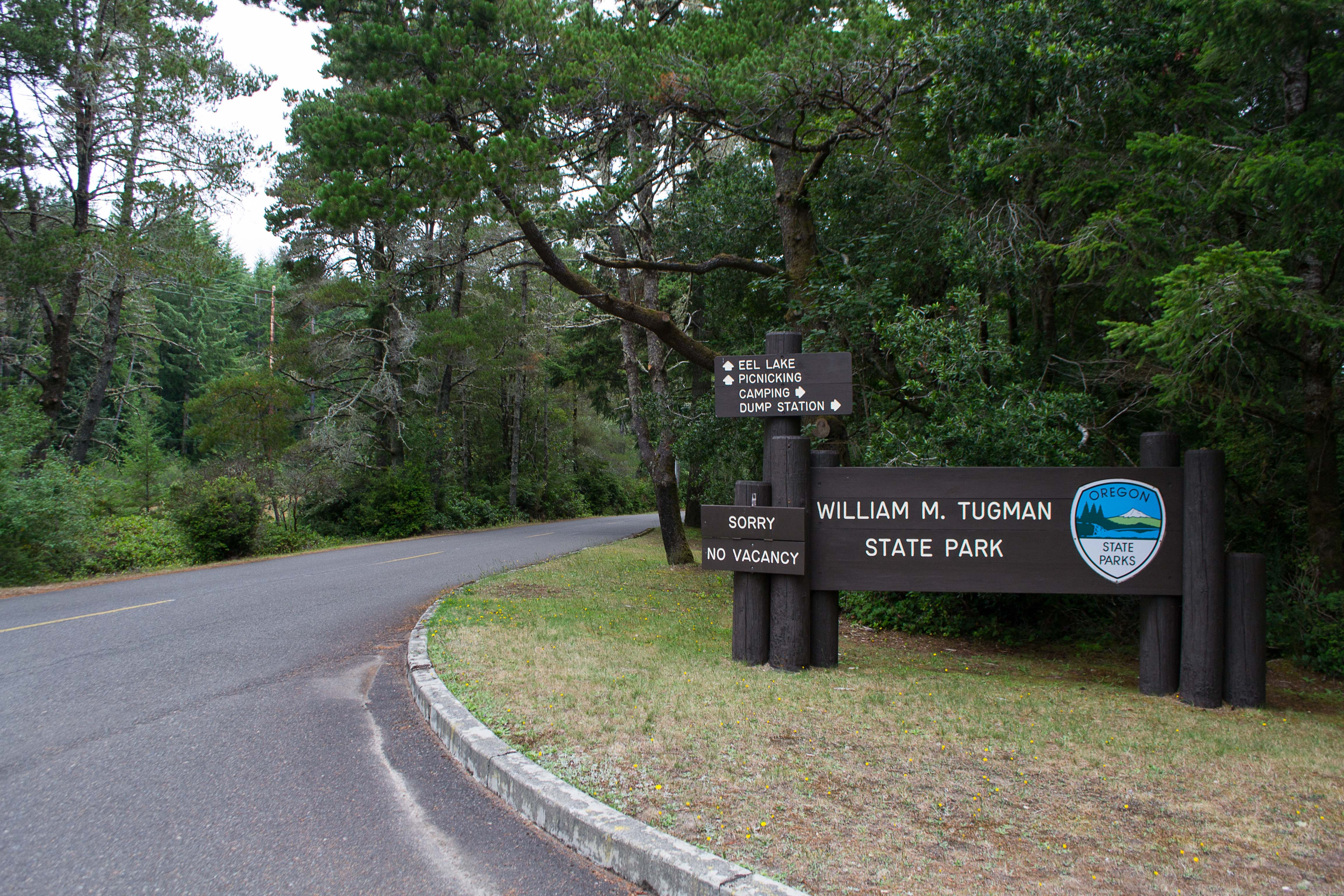
- Entrance to the park

- Location within Oregon Location within the United States
- Type: Public, state
- Location: Coos and Douglas counties, Oregon
- Nearest city: Reedsport
- Coordinates: 43°36′04″N 124°10′34″W
- Area: 560 acres (230 ha)
- Operator: Oregon Parks and Recreation Department
- Status: Open year-round

William M. Tugman State Park is a state park in the U.S. state of Oregon. Administered by the Oregon Parks and Recreation Department (OPRD), the park borders Eel Lake, about 8 miles (13 km) south of Reedsport near U.S. Route 101.

Tugman Park has 94 campsites for recreational vehicles (RVs) as well as 16 yurts for hikers and bikers; a day-use area, a boat ramp, a fishing dock, and a hiking trail. Activities on or near the lake include fishing, swimming, boating, and wildlife watching. The lake supports populations of largemouth bass, crappie, stocked rainbow trout, steelhead (sea-run rainbow trout), and Coho salmon, the latter of which must be released if caught.

William M. Tugman (1894–1961) was a journalist from Eugene and Reedsport. In 1957, he became the first chairman of the OPRD Advisory Committee, which made recommendations to the governor about state parks.

== See also ==
- List of Oregon state parks
