= Dean Creek Elk Viewing Area =

Wildlife Management Area in Douglas County, Oregon, United States

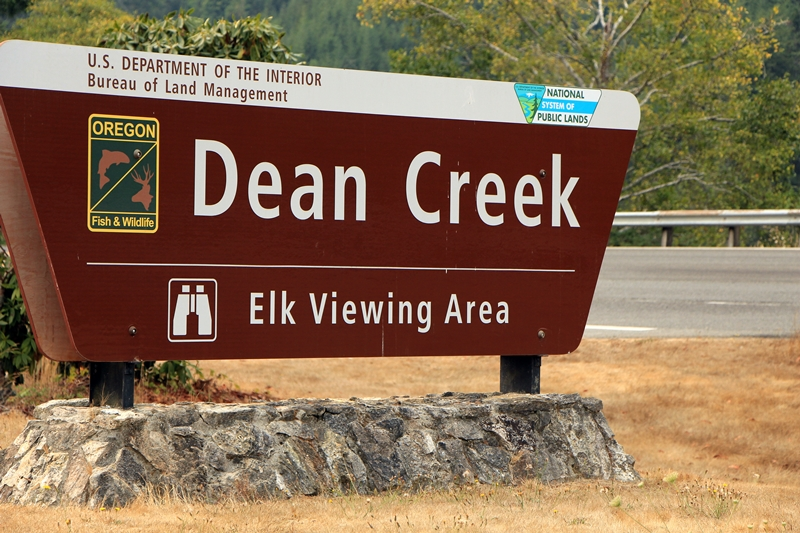

- Location within the United States
- Location: Douglas County, Oregon
- Nearest city: Reedsport
- Coordinates: 43.695°N 124.04°W
- Area: 1,040 acres (4.2 km^{2})
- Established: 1991
- Governing body: ODFW and BLM

The Dean Creek Wildlife Area (or Dean Creek Elk Viewing Area) is a wildlife management area located near Reedsport, Oregon, United States. Jointly managed by the Oregon Department of Fish and Wildlife and the United States Bureau of Land Management, it is the year-round residence for a herd of Roosevelt elk.

== History ==
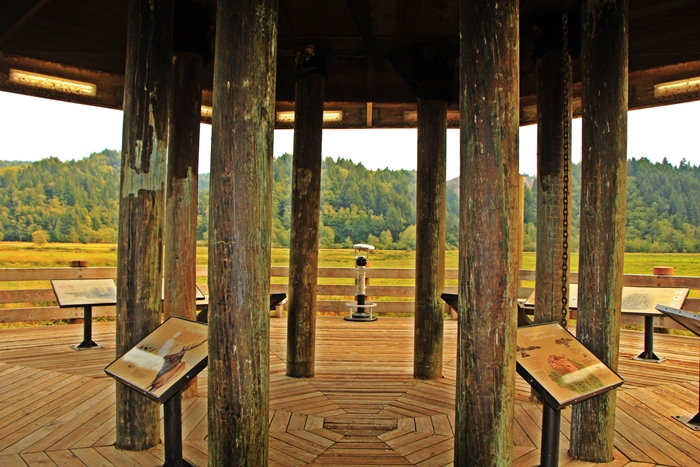
O.H. Hinsdale Interpretive Center

Elk have inhabited the location that is now the Dean Creek Wildlife Area since the 1930s. During that time, native salt marshes were drained and freshwater allowed to irrigate the site's grasslands. Originally used for cattle grazing by area farmers, the Bureau of Land Management, in partnership with the Oregon Department of Fish and Wildlife, took over management of the site in 1991.

The same year, an outdoor, covered interpretive center was constructed at the site. The O.H. Hinsdale Interpretive Center was built at a cost of $85,000 and was named after a Reedsport-area community leader. Funds to finance the center were privately raised by a local community group. In addition to the interpretive center, the site also includes restrooms and several viewing platforms.

== Geography ==
The 1,040 acres (4.2 km^{2}) are roughly divided between pasture and woodland. The pasture (with some wetlands) covers about 440 acres (180 ha) of the area and is generally visible from the road. The remaining 600 acres (240 ha) of the wildlife area comprise mainly conifer trees and other hardwoods.

== Fauna ==
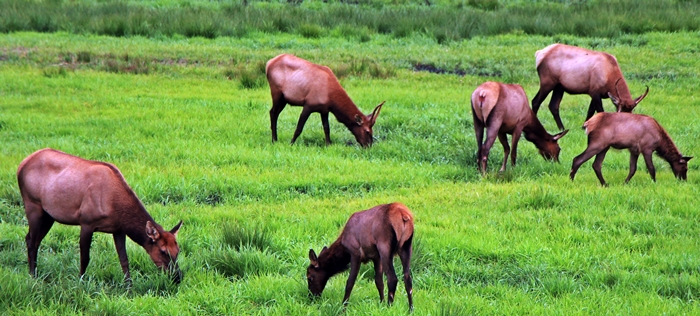
Elk grazing at the Dean Creek Wildlife Area

The Dean Creek Elk Viewing Area is the year-round residence for a herd of about 100 Roosevelt elk. A mild winter climate and abundant food allow the Roosevelt elk to remain at the Dean Creek Elk Viewing Area all year. In addition to the elk, beaver, muskrat, and Canada geese all spend some time at Dean Creek, as do coyotes, red-legged frogs, and the great blue heron. Migrating ducks use the Dean Creek Elk Viewing Area as a rest stop on their long journeys between winter and summer homes, and resident waterfowl raise their young at Dean Creek during the summer.
