= Umpqua Basin =

Watershed in Oregon, USA

Coordinates: 43.2°N 123.2°W

The Umpqua Basin is a watershed in the U.S. state of Oregon. It includes the drainages of the South Umpqua River, North Umpqua River, mainstem Umpqua River and the Smith River.

The basin lies primarily within three ecoregions (Coast Range, Cascades and Klamath Mountains) and contains a wide variety of vegetation.
