= Loon Lake (Oregon) =

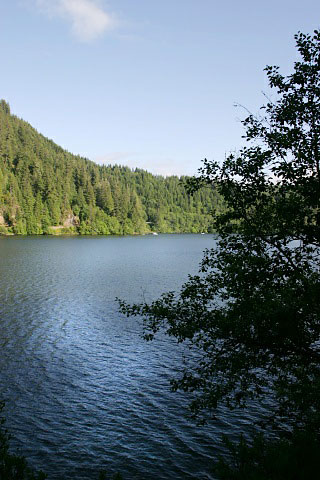

- Location within Oregon Location within the United States
- Location: Douglas County, Oregon
- Coordinates: 43°35′13″N 123°50′14″W
- Type: Landslide-dammed lake, oligotrophic
- Primary inflows: Lake Creek
- Primary outflows: Mill Creek
- Catchment area: 89 sq mi (231 km^{2})
- Basin countries: United States
- Max. length: 2 mi (3 km)
- Max. width: 0.4 mi (0.6 km)
- Surface area: 294 acres (119 ha)
- Average depth: 53 ft (16 m)
- Max. depth: 105 ft (32 m)
- Water volume: 15,700 acre⋅ft (19,400,000 m^{3})
- Residence time: 1 month
- Shore length^{1}: 6.1 mi (9.8 km)
- Surface elevation: 392 ft (119 m)
- ^{1} Shore length is not a well-defined measure.

Loon Lake is a 294-acre (119 ha) lake in Douglas County in the Oregon Coast Range of the United States, 15 miles (24 km) east-southeast of Reedsport, Oregon, at an elevation of 392 feet (119 m). The lake is about 2 miles (3 km) long with a maximum width of about 0.4 miles (0.6 km), and is over 100 feet (30 m) deep in some places.

The lake is "a classic example of a landslide lake", dammed by a slide of sandstone blocks which fell into the Lake Creek valley about 1,400 years ago. The lake was discovered in 1852 and named for the loons found on its waters.

== See also ==
- Ash, Oregon
- List of lakes in Oregon
