= Umpqua River Light =

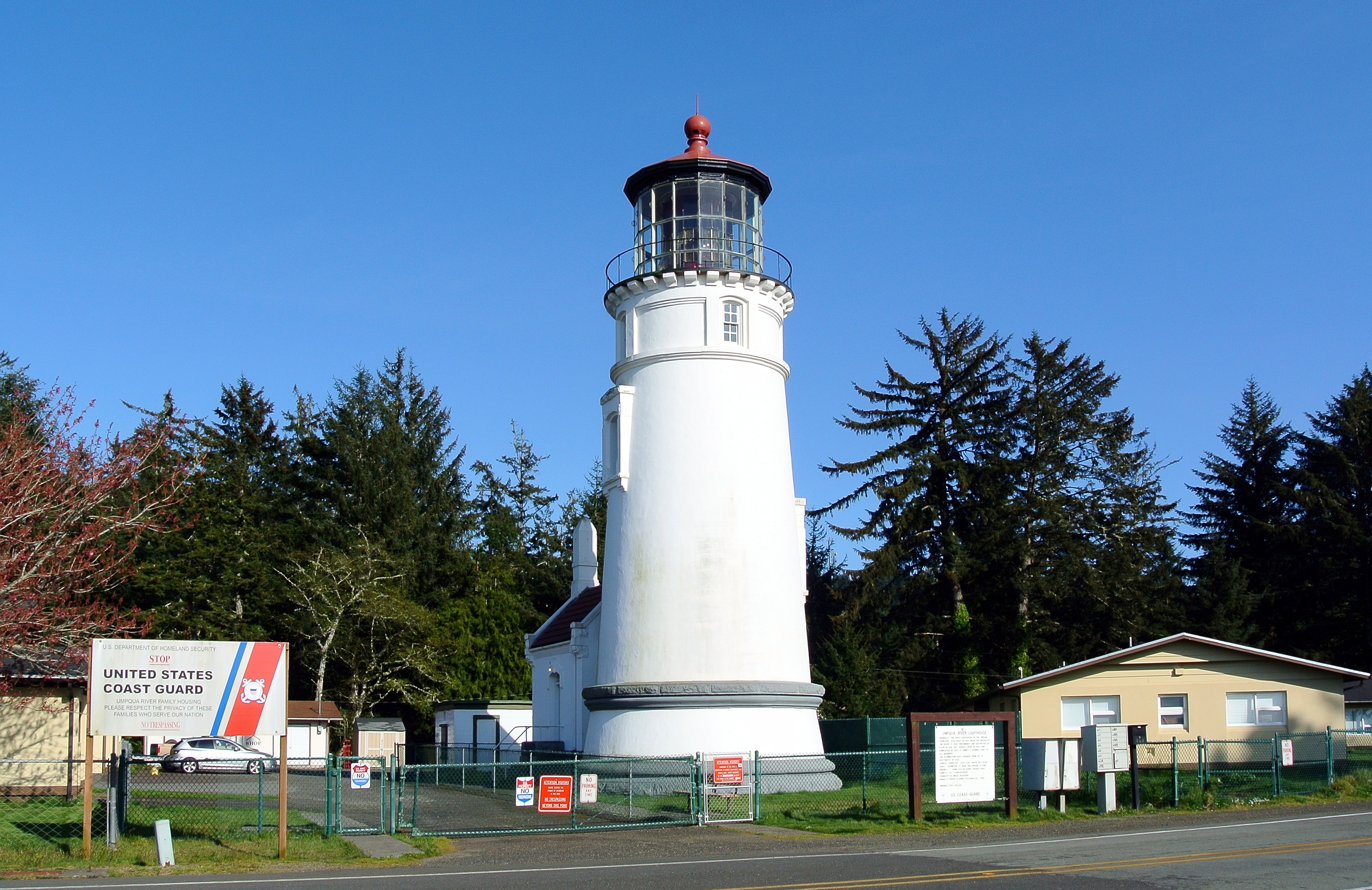
- Umpqua River Light
- Location: Winchester Bay
- Coordinates: 43.662291°N 124.198476°W

Tower
- Foundation: Natural/emplaced/masonry
- Construction: Brick/stuccoed
- Automated: 1966
- Height: 61 feet (19 m)
- Shape: Conical attached to workroom
- Heritage: National Register of Historic Places listed place

Light
- First lit: 1894
- Focal height: 50 m (160 ft)
- Lens: First order Fresnel
- Range: 21 nautical miles (39 km; 24 mi)
- Characteristic: Group Flash White, Alternate Red Flash, 15 sec. 2 W., 1 R Flashes
- Umpqua River Light House
- U.S. National Register of Historic Places
- NRHP reference No.: 77001100
- Added to NRHP: October 21, 1977

The Umpqua River Light is a lighthouse on the Oregon Coast of the United States, located at the mouth of the Umpqua River on Winchester Bay, in Douglas County, Oregon.

== History ==
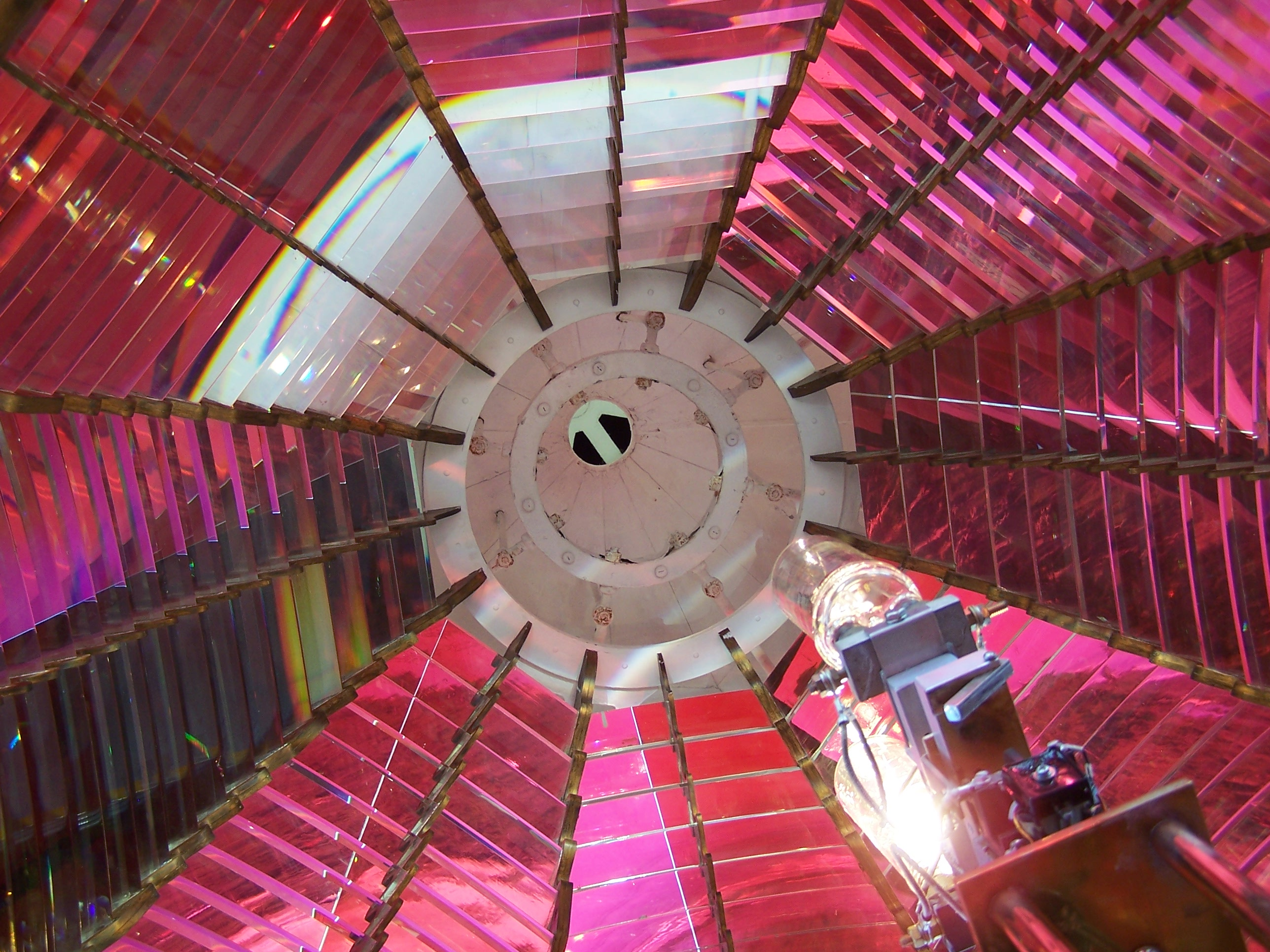
Inside the top of the lighthouse

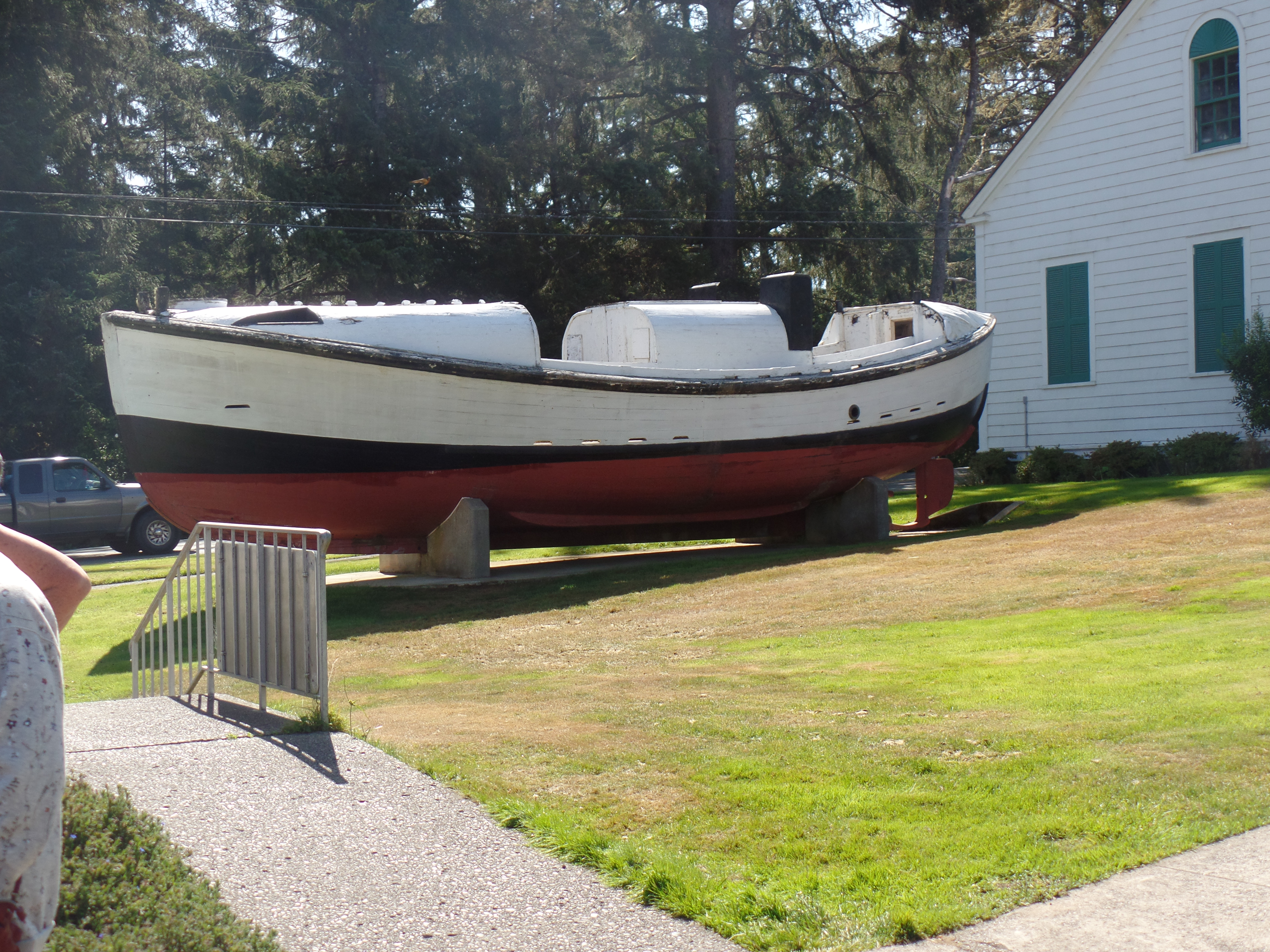
U.S. Coast Guard 36 Foot Motor Lifeboat at Umpqua Lighthouse Museum

Located at the mouth of Winchester Bay, Oregon, the first Umpqua River Light was built in 1855 and lit in 1857. Built along the river channel, the original light was vulnerable to seasonal flooding. This led to yearly erosion of the sand embankment of the light. In October 1863, the building's foundations had become too unstable and the structure soon collapsed. Before its collapse, the Light House Board had foreseen the need to build a new light at the location. However, it was 1888 before Congress approved of a construction of a new light.

Construction started on the new light in 1892, and it was first lit in 1894. Built at the same time as Heceta Head Light, it was built from the same plans and is virtually identical to its more northern sister. Unlike its predecessor, the new light had several advantages over the original light. Built 100 feet (30 m) above the river, the new light was safe from flooding. This was partly due to the Light House Board's insistence that ships be able to plot a course based on visible lighthouses. The original light was not visible at sea and was only usable as an aid to ships approaching the river. The new light used a clockwork mechanism to rotate the Fresnel lens, and was eventually automated in 1966. The rotation mechanism served in the light for 89 years before it finally broke down and was removed. The Coast Guard, in charge of the light at this point, wanted to replace the mechanism with a new one. However, strong public outcry forced those plans to be aborted, and in 1985, the old mechanism was returned to its position after being fully restored.

The structure was listed on the National Register of Historic Places in 1977.

As of December 2024, visitors can tour the lighthouse and adjacent Coastal History Museum year round, though hours are shortened in the winter. The museum is located in a historic U.S. Coast Guard station and features exhibits on the lighthouse, local history and the U.S. Coast Guard history on the Umpqua River.

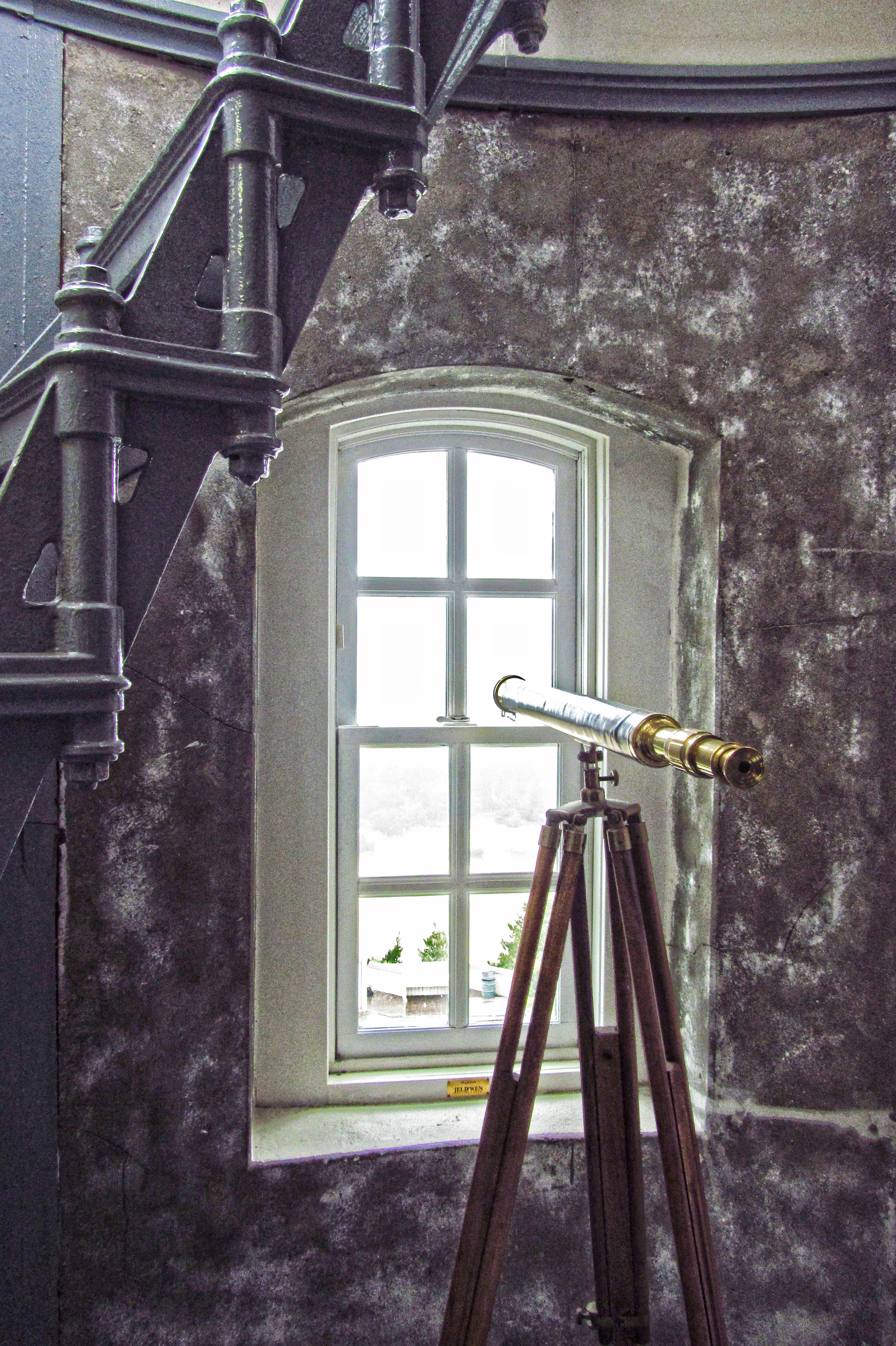
Lightkeepers Telescope

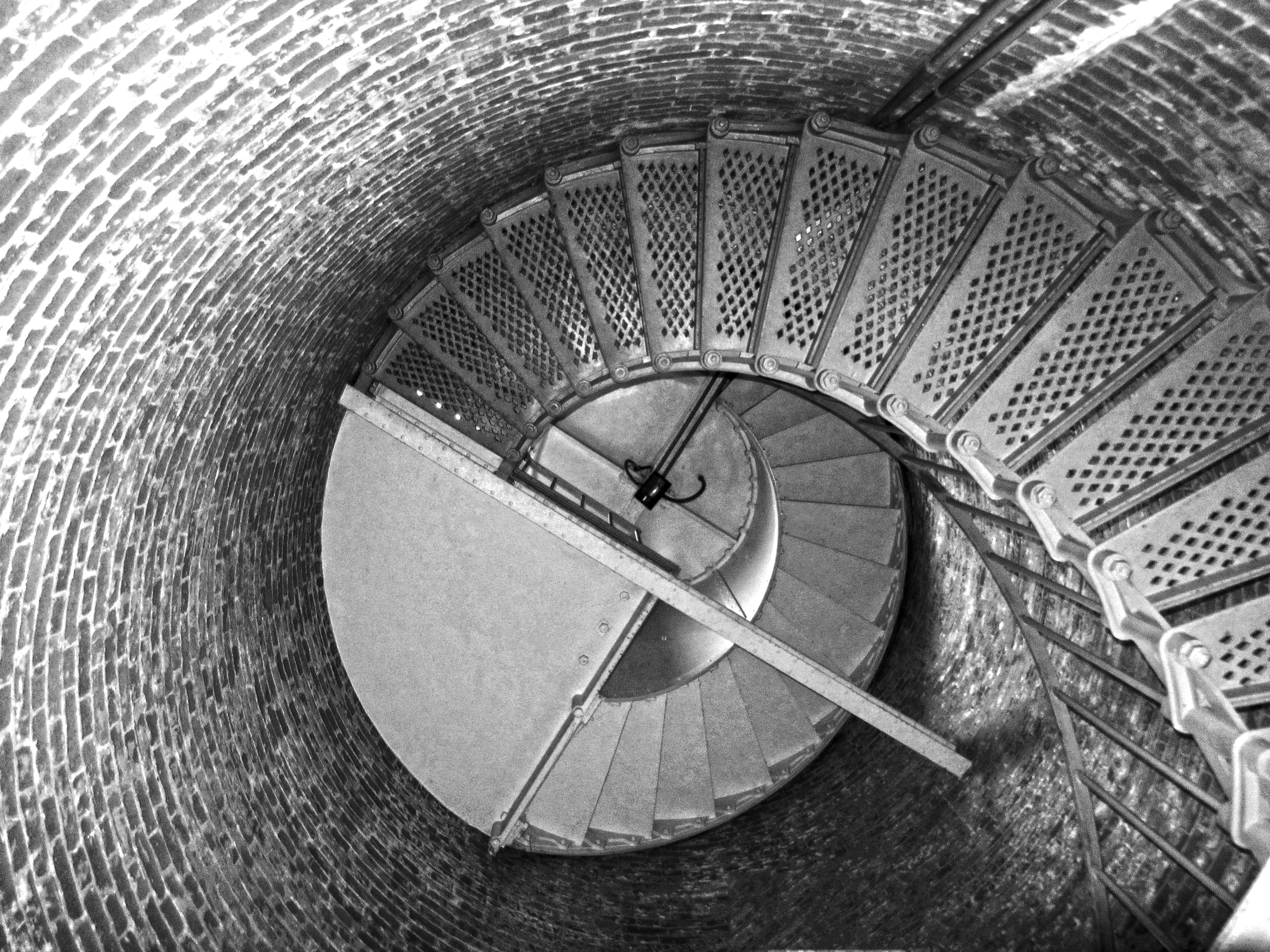
Lighthouse Stairwell

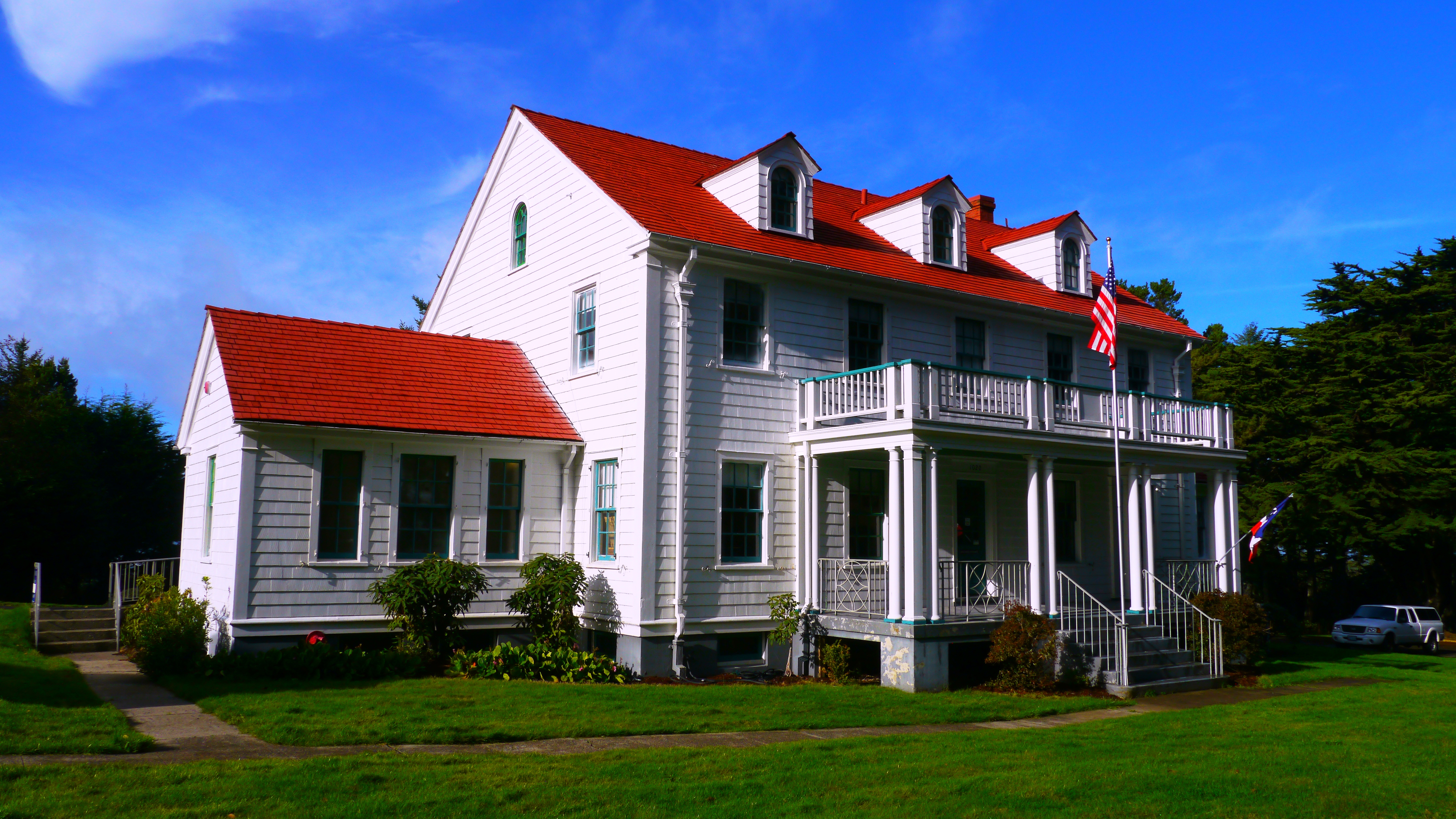
Umpqua River Lighthouse Museum

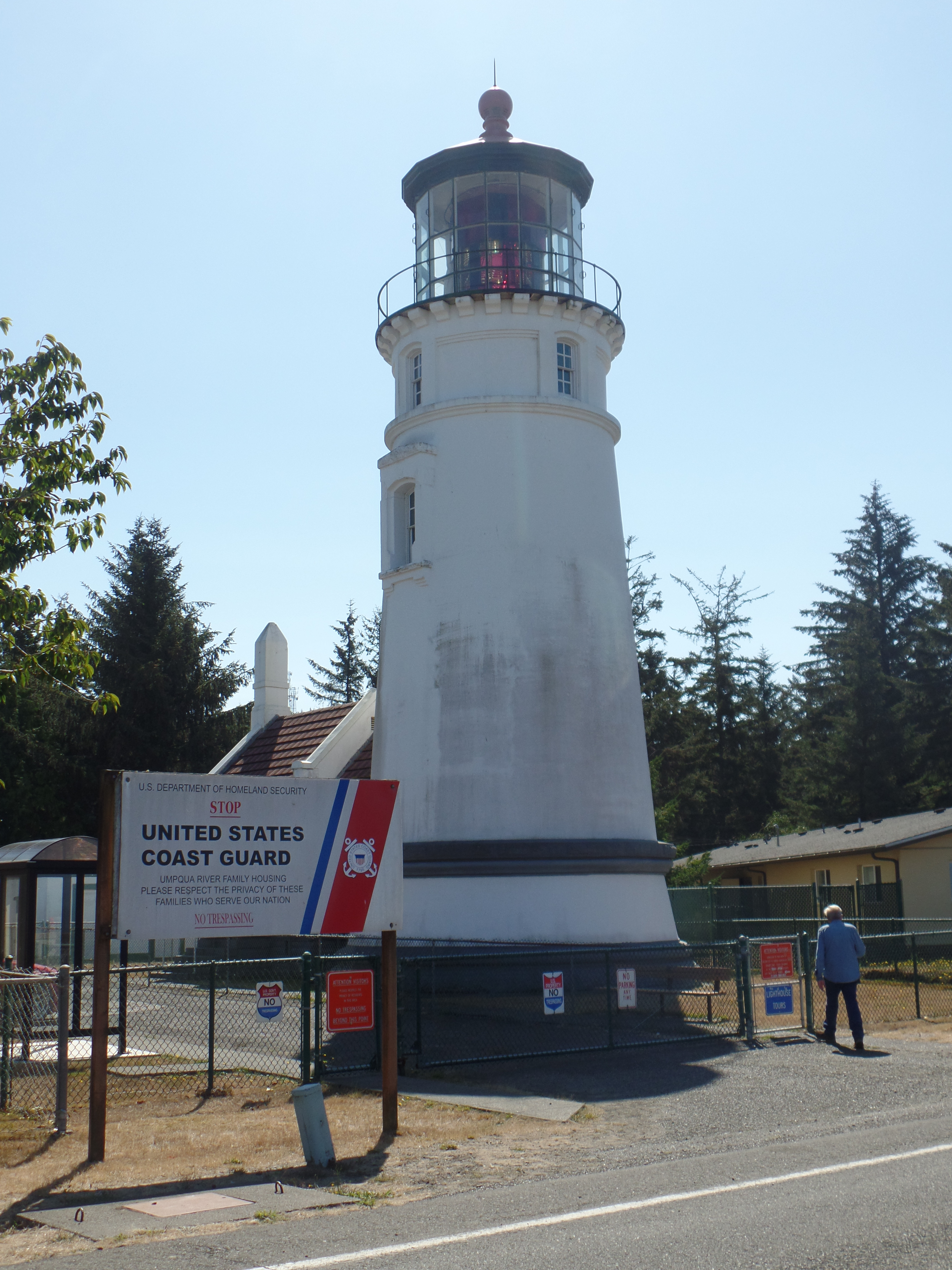
Umpqua River Lighthouse

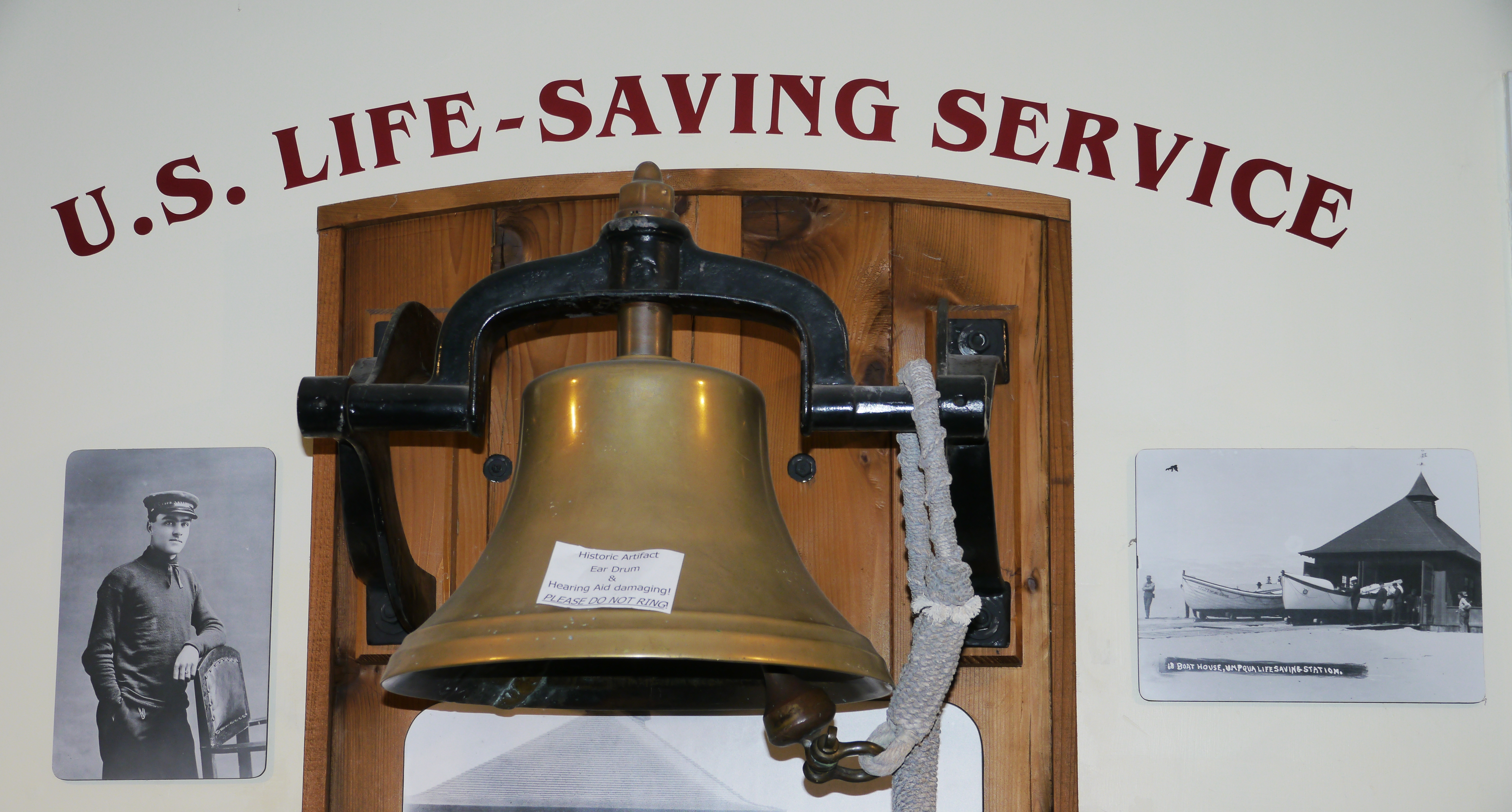
Museum Exhibit

== See also ==
- List of lighthouses on the Oregon Coast
