= Lakeside, Oregon =

- City
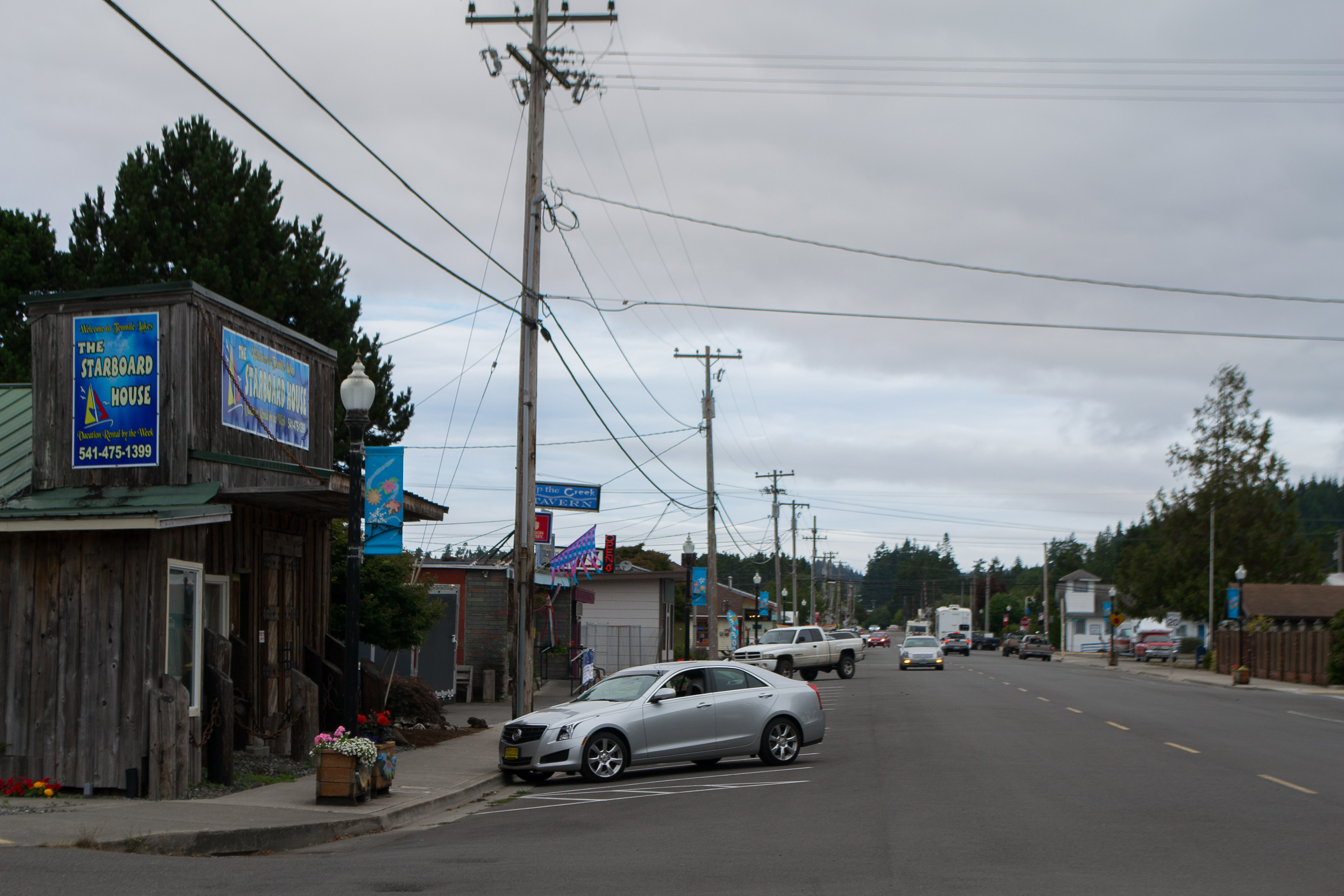
- Looking north on South Eighth Street

- Location in Oregon
- Coordinates: 43°34′44″N 124°10′28″W
- Country: United States
- State: Oregon
- County: Coos
- Incorporated: 1974

Government
  - Mayor: Nikki Wood

Area
  - Total: 2.29 sq mi (5.93 km^{2})
  - Land: 2.00 sq mi (5.18 km^{2})
  - Water: 0.29 sq mi (0.76 km^{2})
- Elevation: 23 ft (7.0 m)

Population (2020)
  - Total: 1,904
  - Density: 952.6/sq mi (367.82/km^{2})
- Time zone: UTC-8 (Pacific)
  - Summer (DST): UTC-7 (Pacific)
- ZIP code: 97449
- Area code: 541
- FIPS code: 41-40650
- GNIS feature ID: 1144789
- Website: www.cityoflakeside.org

Lakeside is a city in Coos County, Oregon, United States. The population was 1,904 at the 2020 census.

== Geography and climate ==
Lakeside is in Coos County, Oregon, along U.S. Route 101, about 1 mile (2 km) inland from the Pacific Ocean. The city is 15 miles (24 km) north of Coos Bay and 197 miles (317 km) southwest of Portland.

Lakeside borders Tenmile Lake and Tenmile Creek, which flows from the lake to the ocean. The city is 23 feet (7.0 m) above sea level. According to the United States Census Bureau, the city has a total area of 2.29 square miles (5.93 km^{2}), of which 2.00 square miles (5.18 km^{2}) is land and 0.29 square miles (0.75 km^{2}) is water.

Climate data for Lakeside, Oregon
Month	Jan	Feb	Mar	Apr	May	Jun	Jul	Aug	Sep	Oct	Nov	Dec	Year
Record high °F (°C)	70 (21)	78 (26)	76 (24)	86 (30)	94 (34)	95 (35)	94 (34)	104 (40)	95 (35)	95 (35)	70 (21)	67 (19)	104 (40)
Mean daily maximum °F (°C)	51 (11)	55 (13)	57 (14)	59 (15)	64 (18)	68 (20)	72 (22)	73 (23)	73 (23)	66 (19)	56 (13)	51 (11)	62 (17)
Mean daily minimum °F (°C)	36 (2)	38 (3)	38 (3)	40 (4)	44 (7)	48 (9)	50 (10)	51 (11)	48 (9)	44 (7)	40 (4)	37 (3)	43 (6)
Record low °F (°C)	18 (−8)	14 (−10)	18 (−8)	27 (−3)	31 (−1)	34 (1)	39 (4)	36 (2)	34 (1)	28 (−2)	24 (−4)	9 (−13)	9 (−13)
Average precipitation inches (mm)	11.71 (297)	9.10 (231)	8.55 (217)	5.44 (138)	3.68 (93)	2.00 (51)	0.62 (16)	0.97 (25)	2.14 (54)	4.97 (126)	10.60 (269)	11.16 (283)	70.94 (1,802)
Average snowfall inches (cm)	0.7 (1.8)	0.2 (0.51)	0 (0)	0 (0)	0 (0)	0 (0)	0 (0)	0 (0)	0 (0)	0 (0)	0 (0)	0.3 (0.76)	1.2 (3.0)

== Demographics ==
=== 2020 census ===
As of the 2020 census, Lakeside had a population of 1,904. The median age was 60.7 years; 10.6% of residents were under the age of 18 and 40.4% were 65 years of age or older. For every 100 females there were 99.8 males, and for every 100 females age 18 and over there were 102.7 males age 18 and over.

0% of residents lived in urban areas, while 100.0% lived in rural areas.

There were 875 households in Lakeside, of which 13.5% had children under the age of 18 living in them. Of all households, 44.6% were married-couple households, 24.0% were households with a male householder and no spouse or partner present, and 20.8% were households with a female householder and no spouse or partner present. About 29.6% of all households were made up of individuals and 20.1% had someone living alone who was 65 years of age or older.

There were 1,068 housing units, of which 18.1% were vacant. Among occupied housing units, 77.1% were owner-occupied and 22.9% were renter-occupied. The homeowner vacancy rate was 3.3% and the rental vacancy rate was 0.5%.

Racial composition as of the 2020 census
Race	Number	Percent
White	1,684	88.4%
Black or African American	4	0.2%
American Indian and Alaska Native	30	1.6%
Asian	2	0.1%
Native Hawaiian and Other Pacific Islander	2	0.1%
Some other race	31	1.6%
Two or more races	151	7.9%
Hispanic or Latino (of any race)	88	4.6%

=== 2010 census ===
As of the census of 2010, there were 1,699 people, 806 households, and 489 families residing in the city. The population density was 849.5 inhabitants per square mile (328.0/km^{2}). There were 967 housing units at an average density of 483.5 per square mile (186.7/km^{2}). The racial makeup of the city was 94.4% White, 0.3% African American, 1.5% Native American, 0.2% Asian, 0.9% from other races, and 2.6% from two or more races. Hispanic or Latino of any race were 3.2% of the population.

There were 806 households, of which 14.0% had children under the age of 18 living with them, 49.3% were married couples living together, 6.6% had a female householder with no husband present, 4.8% had a male householder with no wife present, and 39.3% were non-families. 30.1% of all households were made up of individuals, and 15.3% had someone living alone who was 65 years of age or older. The average household size was 2.08 and the average family size was 2.49.

The median age in the city was 57.9 years. 11.9% of residents were under the age of 18; 3.5% were between the ages of 18 and 24; 14.3% were from 25 to 44; 35.5% were from 45 to 64; and 34.7% were 65 years of age or older. The gender makeup of the city was 51.0% male and 49.0% female.

=== 2000 census ===
Historical population
Census	Pop.	Note	%±
1910	125		—
1920	92		−26.4%
1940	134		—
1950	150		11.9%
1960	350		133.3%
1970	900		157.1%
1980	1,453		61.4%
1990	1,437		−1.1%
2000	1,371		−4.6%
2010	1,699		23.9%
2020	1,904		12.1%

As of the census of 2000, there were 1,371 people, 649 households, and 436 families residing in the city. The population density was 692.7 inhabitants per square mile (267.5/km^{2}). There were 764 housing units at an average density of 386.0 per square mile (149.0/km^{2}). The racial makeup of the city was 93.73% White, 0.15% African American, 1.75% Native American, 0.44% Asian, 0.07% Pacific Islander, 0.95% from other races, and 2.92% from two or more races. Hispanic or Latino of any race were 2.55% of the population.

There were 649 households, out of which 15.9% had children under the age of 18 living with them, 57.6% were married couples living together, 6.8% had a female householder with no husband present, and 32.7% were non-families. 26.8% of all households were made up of individuals, and 13.7% had someone living alone who was 65 years of age or older. The average household size was 2.11 and the average family size was 2.50.

In the city, the population dispersal was 14.6% under the age of 18, 4.3% from 18 to 24, 17.9% from 25 to 44, 33.2% from 45 to 64, and 30.1% who were 65 years of age or older. The median age was 53 years. For every 100 females, there were 98.1 males. For every 100 females age 18 and over, there were 96.1 males.

The median income for a household in the city was $25,781, and the median income for a family was $34,688. Males had a median income of $31,364 versus $20,568 for females. The per capita income for the city was $16,702. About 11.6% of families and 15.2% of the population were below the poverty line, including 25.3% of those under age 18 and 7.9% of those age 65 or over.

== Transportation ==
- Lakeside State Airport

== Education ==
It is in the North Bend School District 13. The comprehensive high school is North Bend High School.
