= Umpqua River =

River in Oregon, United States

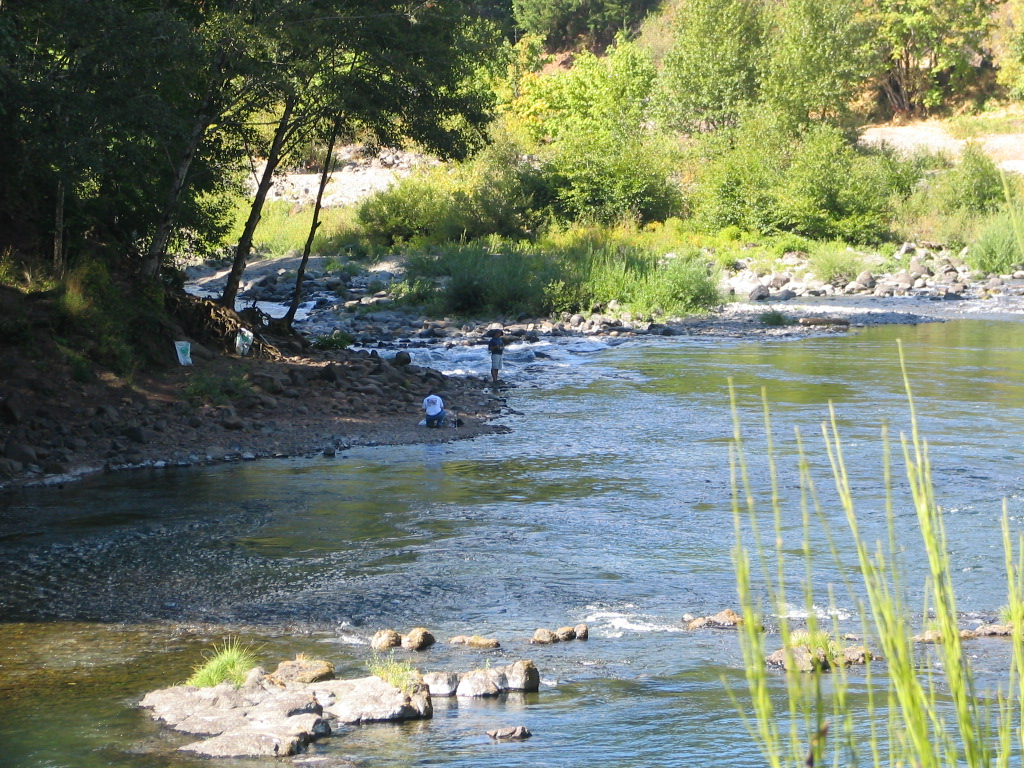
- Fishing in the Umpqua River

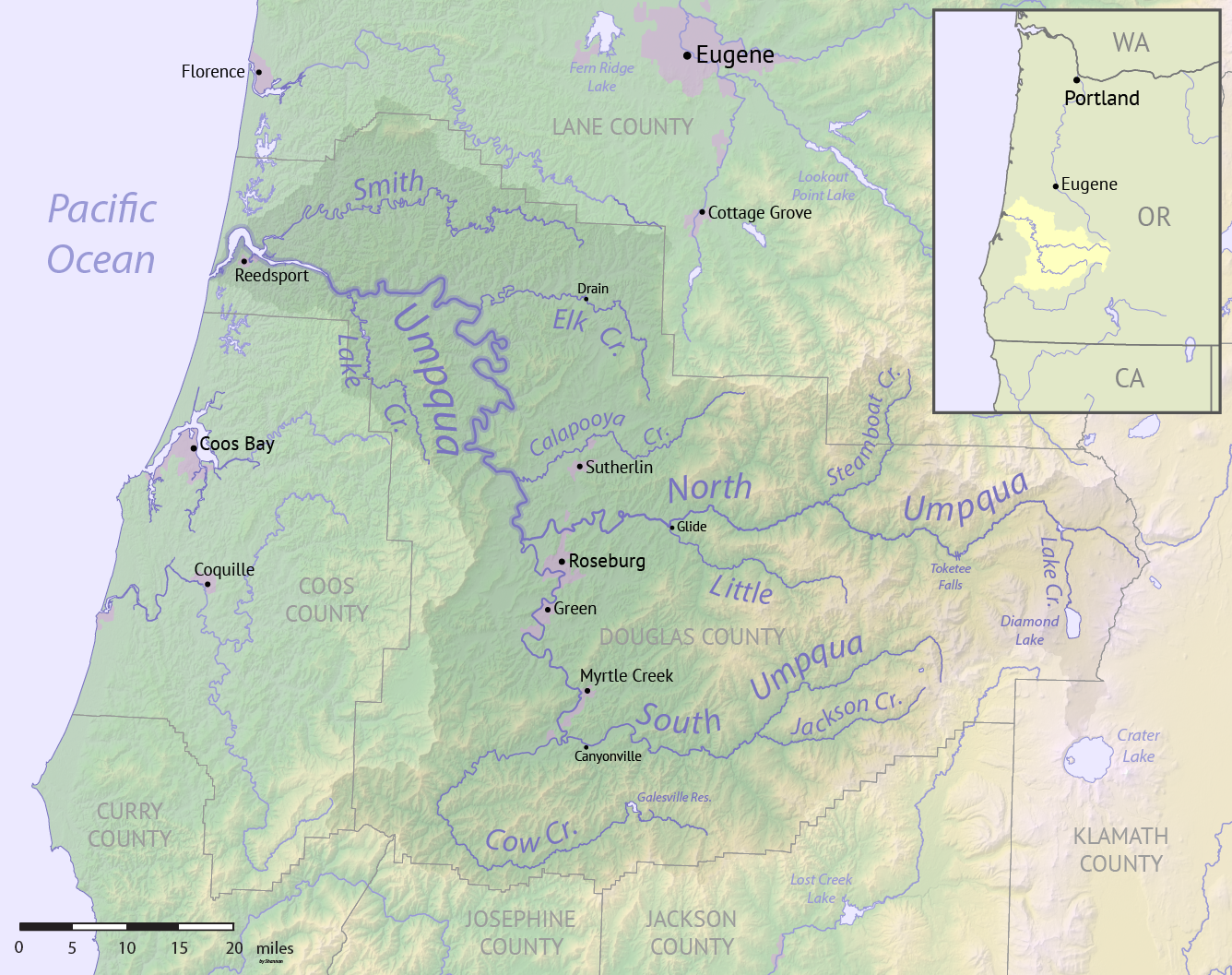
- Map of the Umpqua River watershed
- Etymology: A Native American word for the locality of the river, later applied to the tribe as well

Location
- Country: United States
- State: Oregon
- County: Douglas

Physical characteristics
- Source: Confluence of North and South Umpqua Rivers
  - location: Near Roseburg
  - coordinates: 43°16′05″N 123°26′46″W
  - elevation: 362 ft (110 m)
- Mouth: Pacific Ocean
  - location: Reedsport
  - coordinates: 43°40′09″N 124°12′18″W
  - elevation: 0 ft (0 m)
- Length: 111 mi (179 km)
- Basin size: 4,640 sq mi (12,000 km^{2})
- Discharge
  - location: near Elkton, 56.9 miles (91.6 km) from the mouth
  - average: 7,343 cu ft/s (207.9 m^{3}/s)
  - minimum: 663 cu ft/s (18.8 m^{3}/s)
  - maximum: 265,000 cu ft/s (7,500 m^{3}/s)

The Umpqua River (/ˈʌmpkwə/ UMP-kwə) on the Pacific coast of Oregon in the United States is approximately 111 miles (179 km) long. One of the principal rivers of the Oregon Coast and known for bass and shad, the river drains an expansive network of valleys in the mountains west of the Cascade Range and south of the Willamette Valley, from which it is separated by the Calapooya Mountains. From its source northeast of Roseburg, the Umpqua flows northwest through the Oregon Coast Range and empties into the Pacific at Winchester Bay. The river and its tributaries flow almost entirely within Douglas County, which encompasses most of the watershed of the river from the Cascades to the coast. The "Hundred Valleys of the Umpqua" form the heart of the timber industry of southern Oregon, generally centered on Roseburg.

The Native Americans in the Umpqua's watershed consist of several tribes, such as the Lower and Upper Umpqua (for which the river is named), and the Kalapuya. These tribes witnessed much of the Great Flood of 1862, during which the Umpqua and other rivers rose to levels so high that even the oldest natives had never seen a greater flood.

== Course ==
The North Umpqua and South Umpqua rivers rise in the Southern Oregon Cascades, and flow generally west for over 100 miles (160 km) to join approximately 6 miles (10 km) northwest of Roseburg. In modern terminology, the "Umpqua Valley" is sometimes taken to refer to the populated lower reaches of the South Umpqua south of Roseburg, along the route of Interstate 5. The North Umpqua rises from snowmelt and is considered one of the premier summer steelhead streams in the West.

From Roseburg, the Umpqua flows generally northwest through broad farming valleys in the Oregon Coast Range in a serpentine course past the settlement of Umpqua and the city Elkton. At Elkton, it turns to flow west through a narrower canyon past Scottsburg, which is located at the head of tide. At this point, the Umpqua River becomes navigable. It enters Winchester Bay on the Pacific near Reedsport. It receives the Smith River from the north near its estuary on Winchester Bay. The Umpqua River Light protects ships nearing the mouth of the river.

The Umpqua is one of four major rivers in Oregon that start in or east of the Cascade Range and reach the Pacific Ocean. The others are the Rogue River (in Oregon), Klamath River (flowing from Oregon to California) and Columbia River (flowing from British Columbia to Washington and the Pacific between Oregon and Washington).

=== Tributaries ===
Named tributaries from source to mouth are the North Umpqua and South Umpqua rivers followed by Hidden Valley, Calapooya, Mill, Hubbard, and Rock creeks. Next come Bottle, Cougar, Wolf, Powell, Leonard, Basin, and Lost creeks followed by Galagher Canyon. Yellow Creek is next, then Deep Gulch and McGee, Waggoner, Martin, Brads, Williams, Whitehorse, Mehl, Fitzpatrick, and Heddin creeks.

Further downstream is Elk Creek then Grubbe, Hart, Beener, Gould, Sawyer, Paradise, Stony Brook, and Little Stony Brook creeks. Then come Scott, Butler, Lutsinger, Weatherly, Burchard, Golden, Wells, and Little Mill Creek. Mill Creek is next, followed by Luder, Charlotte, Franklin, Indian Charlie, Harvey, and Dean creeks. Entering the lower reaches are the Smith River and Scholfield, Providence, and Winchester creeks.

== History ==
In the early 19th century, the Upper Umpqua tribe ceded most of its land to the U.S. government in the 1854 Treaty with the Umpqua and Kalapuya, agreeing to move to a reservation in Lincoln County as part of the Confederated Tribes of Siletz.

The Umpqua River valley was inhabited by several different bands of Indians: primarily the Athabaskan-speaking Upper Umpqua, Takelman speaking Cow Creek Band of Umpqua, the Yoncalla (a Kalapuyan people) in the north, and the Quich (Lower Umpqua) from Scottsburg/Wells Creek to the coast. The Quich (or Kuitsh) spoke a dialect of the Siuslaw language.

In the Great Flood of 1862, the Umpqua River had the largest flood known to all of the area's Indians at the time, and water was 10 to 15 feet (3.0 to 4.6 m) higher than the 1853 flood. It rose from November 3 to December 3, subsided for two days then rose again until December 9. At Fort Umpqua, communication up river was cut off above Scottsburg, and the river was full of floating houses, barns, rails and produce. The Coquille River swept away settlers' property. Great damage also occurred on the Rogue River and on other small streams.

== Recreation ==
The Umpqua River is a popular flyfishing and whitewater rafting destination. It has a high concentration of steelhead trout and is also home to salmon, sturgeon, bass, and shad. There are several campgrounds and RV parks on the Umpqua River, some of which offer riverfront RV camping, boat ramps, fish cleaning stations, and hot showers for guests to use.

== Gallery ==
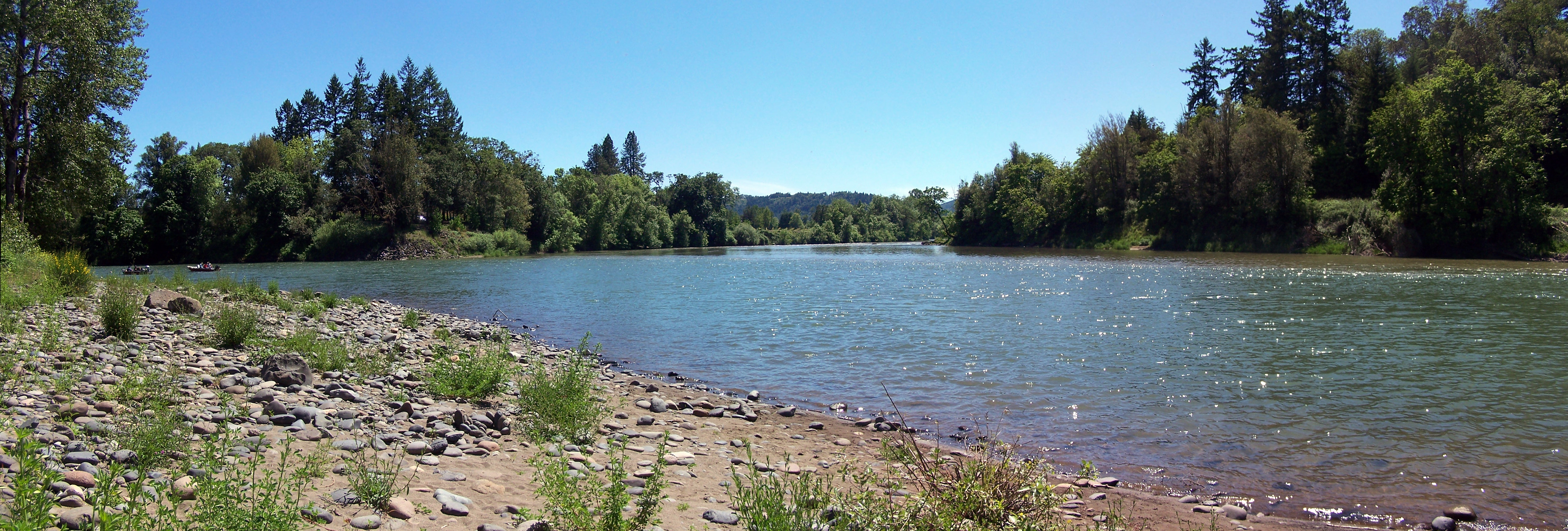
The Umpqua River's headwaters at the confluence of the North Umpqua (left) and the South Umpqua (center)

Scholfield Creek, in Reedsport

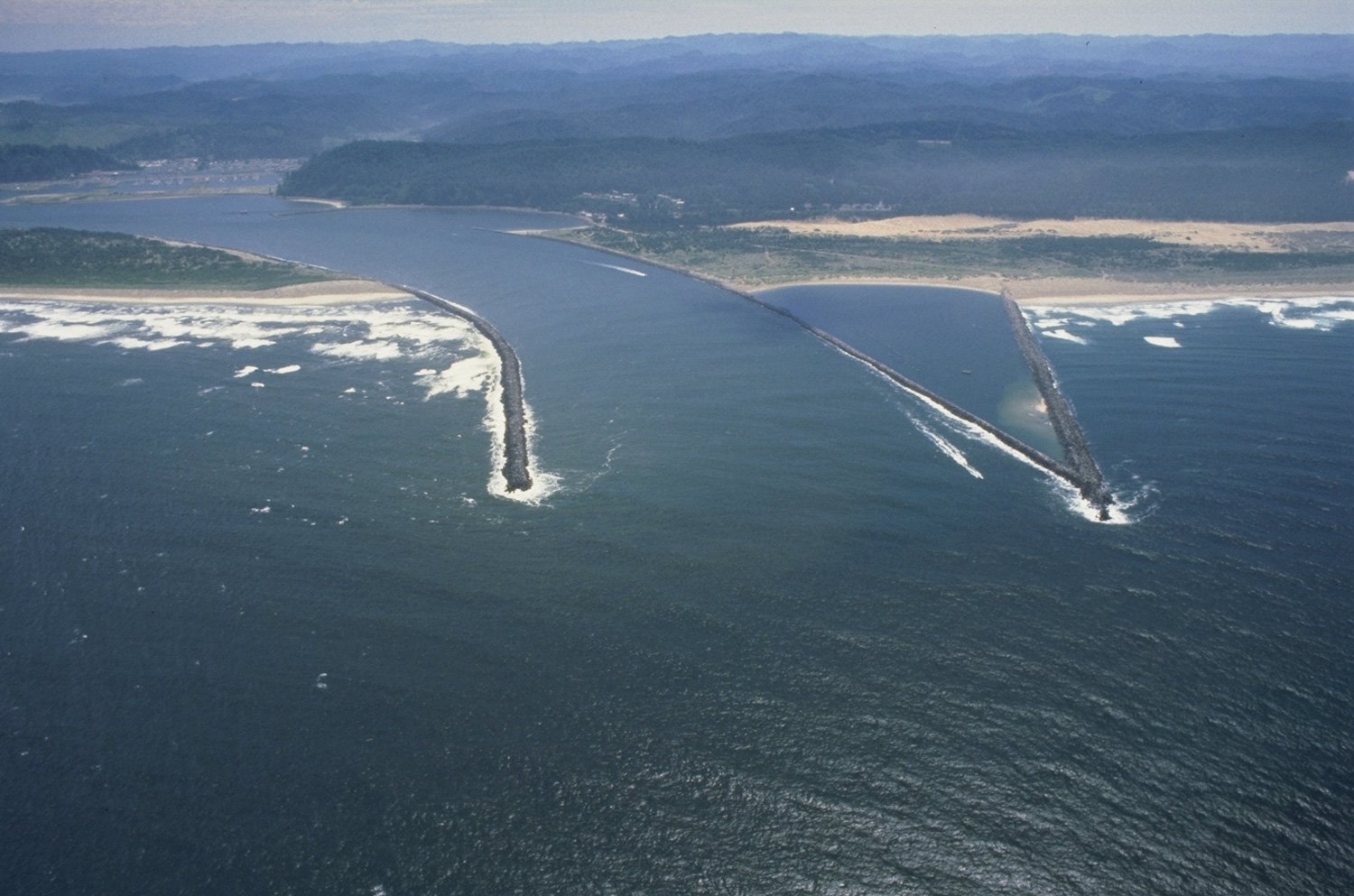
The mouth of the Umpqua River on the Pacific Ocean at Winchester Bay

Bridge over the South Umpqua near Myrtle Creek

== See also ==
- List of longest streams of Oregon
- List of rivers of Oregon
- Umpqua Basin
