= Winchester Bay, Oregon =

Unincorporated community in the state of Oregon, United States

- Census-designated place (CDP)
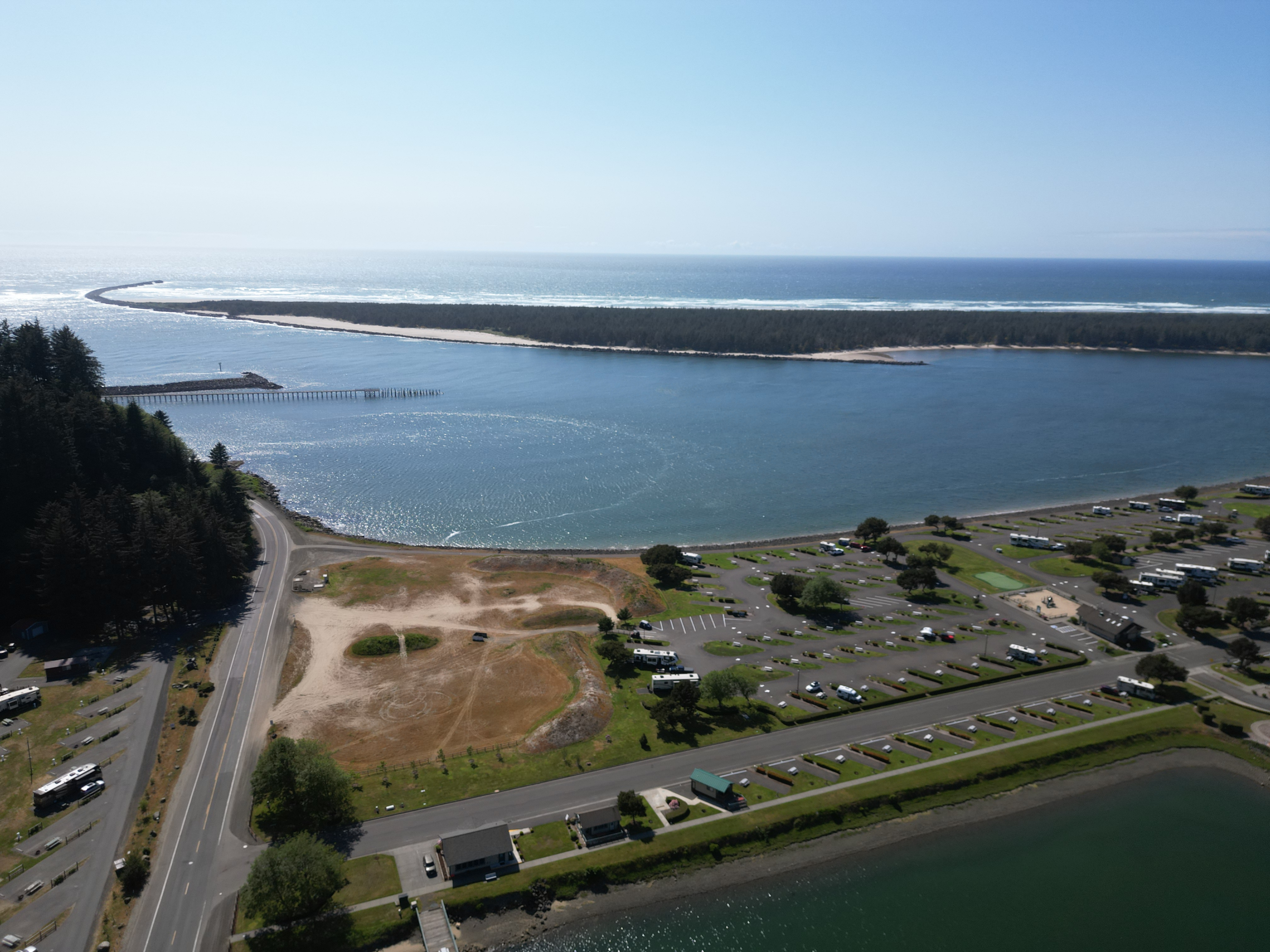
- Winchester Bay Market
- Motto: "Crab Capital of the World"
- Location of Winchester Bay, Oregon
- Coordinates: 43°40′18″N 124°11′09″W
- Country: United States
- State: Oregon
- County: Douglas

Area
  - Total: 3.56 sq mi (9.21 km^{2})
  - Land: 2.65 sq mi (6.86 km^{2})
  - Water: 0.90 sq mi (2.34 km^{2})
- Elevation: 256 ft (78 m)

Population (2020)
  - Total: 462
  - Density: 174.4/sq mi (67.33/km^{2})
- Time zone: UTC-8 (Pacific (PST))
  - Summer (DST): UTC-7 (PDT)
- ZIP code: 97467
- Area codes: 458 and 541
- FIPS code: 41-83050
- GNIS feature ID: 2409605

Winchester Bay, formerly Umpqua City, is an unincorporated community in Douglas County, Oregon, United States. For statistical purposes, the United States Census Bureau has defined Winchester Bay as a census-designated place (CDP). The census definition of the area may not precisely correspond to local understanding of the area with the same name. As of the 2020 census, Winchester Bay had a population of 462. The community of Umpqua City was established in 1850.

== Geography and climate ==
According to the United States Census Bureau, the CDP has a total area of 3.1 square miles (8.1 km^{2}), of which 2.3 square miles (6.0 km^{2}) is land and 0.81 square miles (2.1 km^{2}), or 26.24%, is water.

Climate data for Winchester Bay, Oregon
Month	Jan	Feb	Mar	Apr	May	Jun	Jul	Aug	Sep	Oct	Nov	Dec	Year
Record high °F (°C)	70 (21)	80 (27)	82 (28)	93 (34)	98 (37)	98 (37)	101 (38)	102 (39)	101 (38)	94 (34)	80 (27)	69 (21)	102 (39)
Mean daily maximum °F (°C)	53.9 (12.2)	55.3 (12.9)	56.4 (13.6)	58.9 (14.9)	62.5 (16.9)	65.6 (18.7)	69.6 (20.9)	70.4 (21.3)	70.8 (21.6)	64.8 (18.2)	57.7 (14.3)	52.8 (11.6)	61.6 (16.4)
Mean daily minimum °F (°C)	39.3 (4.1)	38.8 (3.8)	39.5 (4.2)	41.9 (5.5)	46.0 (7.8)	49.4 (9.7)	51.8 (11.0)	51.9 (11.1)	50.0 (10.0)	45.7 (7.6)	42.0 (5.6)	39.4 (4.1)	44.6 (7.0)
Record low °F (°C)	12 (−11)	16 (−9)	23 (−5)	24 (−4)	28 (−2)	30 (−1)	35 (2)	33 (1)	28 (−2)	25 (−4)	17 (−8)	10 (−12)	10 (−12)
Average precipitation inches (mm)	11.14 (283)	10.59 (269)	10.35 (263)	6.06 (154)	3.58 (91)	2.52 (64)	0.35 (8.9)	0.67 (17)	2.60 (66)	6.18 (157)	10.63 (270)	12.21 (310)	76.88 (1,953)
Average snowfall inches (cm)	0.7 (1.8)	0.2 (0.51)	0 (0)	0 (0)	0 (0)	0 (0)	0 (0)	0 (0)	0 (0)	0 (0)	0 (0)	0.3 (0.76)	1.2 (3.0)
Average rainy days	19.4	17.0	18.9	16.4	12.9	9.4	4.5	4.6	6.1	12.2	20.3	19.3	161.0
Average relative humidity (%)	85	84	82	78	76	75	72	73	73	80	84	86	79
Source 1:
Source 2:

== Demographics ==
Historical population
Census	Pop.	Note	%±
2020	462		—
U.S. Decennial Census

=== 2000 Census data ===
As of the census of 2000, there were 488 people, 238 households, and 139 families residing in the CDP. The population density was 183.6 inhabitants per square mile (70.9/km^{2}). There were 362 housing units at an average density of 136.2 per square mile (52.6/km^{2}). The racial makeup of the CDP was 96.11% White, 1.43% Native American, 0.41% Asian, 0.20% from other races, and 1.84% from two or more races. Hispanic or Latino of any race were 1.43% of the population. There were 238 households, out of which 16.8% had children under the age of 18 living with them, 50.8% were married couples living together, 4.2% had a female householder with no husband present, and 41.2% were non-families. 36.6% of all households were made up of individuals, and 20.2% had someone living alone who was 65 years of age or older. The average household size was 2.01 and the average family size was 2.57.

In the CDP, the population was 16.8% under the age of 18, 7.6% from 18 to 24, 18.9% from 25 to 44, 27.5% from 45 to 64, and 29.3% who were 65 years of age or older. The median age was 50 years. For every 100 females, there were 116.9 males. For every 100 females age 18 and over, there were 120.7 males. The median income for a household in the CDP was $30,139, and the median income for a family was $37,292. Males had a median income of $30,625 versus $22,321 for females. The per capita income for the CDP was $17,307. About 17.9% of families and 21.3% of the population were below the poverty line, including 38.1% of those under age 18 and 6.3% of those age 65 or over.

== Economy ==
The local Winchester Bay Merchant Association promotes economic development in the community. Tourism is a significant component of the economy with recreational vehicle use on the nearby sand dunes, tours of the Umpqua River Lighthouse, and crabbing in the bay as the primary attractions. Winchester Bay, formerly referred to as Whistling Basin by the small Native American population, has seen a marked increase in tourism despite being a sparsely populated outpost. The merchant association has dubbed the community as the "Crab Capital of the World." The largest annual activity is the annual Dune Fest, usually a five-day event. In recent years, Siuslaw National Forest enforcement of alcohol consumption and under-age drinking was enacted to improve safety for participants. Medical care is available at Lower Umpqua Hospital in nearby Reedsport.
