= Reedsport, Oregon =

- Town
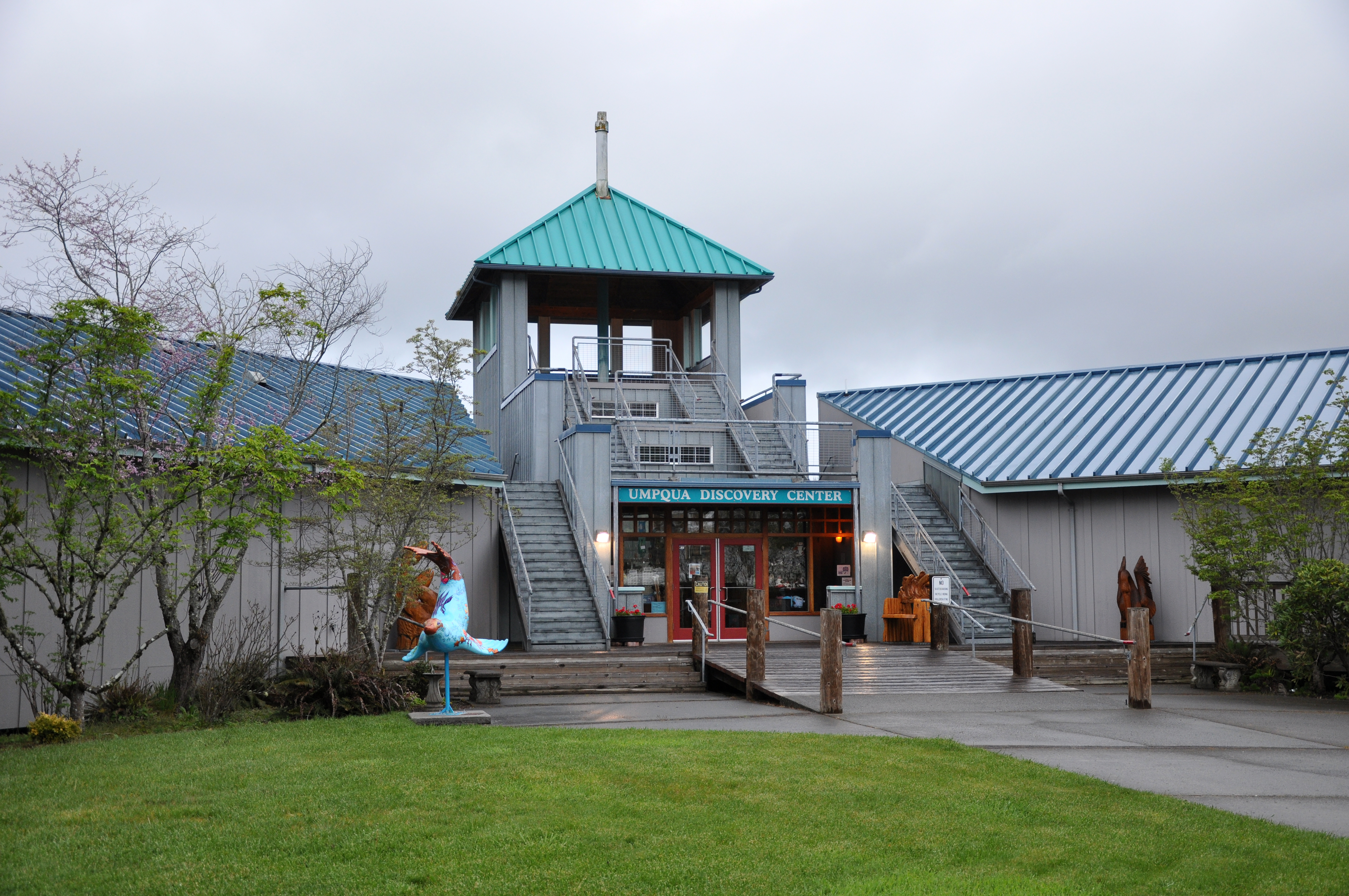
- Umpqua Discovery Center in Reedsport
- Nickname: Gateway to the Dunes
- Motto: The Chainsaw Carving Capital of Oregon
- Location in Oregon

- Location within the United States
- Coordinates: 43°41′47″N 124°07′23″W
- Country: United States
- State: Oregon
- County: Douglas
- Incorporated: 1919

Area
  - Total: 2.30 sq mi (5.96 km^{2})
  - Land: 2.07 sq mi (5.36 km^{2})
  - Water: 0.23 sq mi (0.60 km^{2})
- Elevation: 3 ft (0.91 m)

Population (2020)
  - Total: 4,310
  - Density: 2,082.1/sq mi (803.89/km^{2})
- Time zone: UTC-8 (Pacific)
  - Summer (DST): UTC-7 (Pacific)
- ZIP code: 97467
- Area code: 541
- FIPS code: 41-61300
- GNIS feature ID: 2410921
- Website: www.cityofreedsport.org

Reedsport is a coastal town in northwest Douglas County, Oregon, United States. As of the 2020 census, the population was 4,310. It is located about 73 miles northwest of Roseburg, the county seat.

== History ==
Reedsport was established on the estuary of the Umpqua River on January 7, 1852. It was named for a local settler, Alfred W. Reed, who founded the city in 1912. The post office was established July 17, 1912.

The building of Southern Pacific Railroad lines extending south to Coos Bay led to the development of Reedsport. Before the post office was established in 1912, Reedsport was a camp for railroad construction workers.

Built on marshy ground, for much of its history Reedsport has struggled with frequent flooding; most of its early buildings were elevated 3 to 8 feet (0.9 to 2.4 m) above ground. After a devastating flood in 1964, a dike was constructed to protect the lower town. During this flood, the waters reached the fish hatchery and overflowed the fish troughs allowing hundreds of thousands of smallmouth bass to be introduced into the Umpqua River. According to fishing reports small-mouth bass became the most abundant fish in the river. Every few years, high water induces city employees to close the dikes to prevent low-lying areas of the city from flooding.

In the last quarter of the 20th century, Reedsport struggled with the collapse of the Oregon timber industry. In the last two decades, Reedsport has seen an increase of tourism. Part of this is due to its close proximity to the fishing of the Umpqua River. Another part of the recent surge in tourism is due to the sand dunes that are near Reedsport.

Although the U.S. Forest Service maintains a local office in the town, Reedsport's historic connection with the timber industry ended in 1999 with the closing of the International Paper plant in nearby Gardiner.

Recently, Reedsport has seen a rise in tourism due to recreation at the nearby Oregon Dunes National Recreation Area in Winchester Bay. A number of businesses catering to all-terrain vehicles have opened in Reedsport to serve the needs of this growing activity.

== Geography and climate ==
Reedsport is at the junction of Oregon Route 38 and U.S. Route 101, 3 miles (5 km) north of Winchester Bay and 54 miles (87 km) northwest of Roseburg.

According to the United States Census Bureau, the city has a total area of 2.31 square miles (5.98 km^{2}), of which, 2.05 square miles (5.31 km^{2}) is land and 0.26 square miles (0.67 km^{2}) is water.

Reedsport has a rainy Mediterranean climate (Köppen Csb), with mild dry summers and mild, very wet winters. Although 26.3 mornings will fall below 32 °F or 0 °C, only 0.9 afternoons reach 90 °F or 32.2 °C, and the hottest temperature recorded is only 97 °F (36.1 °C) on August 29, 1944, and September 5, 1973. Only 0.2 afternoons fail to top freezing each year, and the coldest temperature is 11 °F (−11.7 °C) on December 8, 1972. The wettest month record is November 1973 with 26.07 inches (662.2 mm), whilst June to September have on occasions been rainless.

Climate data for Reedsport, OR
Month	Jan	Feb	Mar	Apr	May	Jun	Jul	Aug	Sep	Oct	Nov	Dec	Year
Record high °F (°C)	67 (19)	75 (24)	77 (25)	90 (32)	96 (36)	92 (33)	95 (35)	97 (36)	97 (36)	93 (34)	73 (23)	69 (21)	97 (36)
Mean daily maximum °F (°C)	50.4 (10.2)	53.8 (12.1)	55.4 (13.0)	58.3 (14.6)	62.4 (16.9)	66.2 (19.0)	69.5 (20.8)	70.2 (21.2)	70.0 (21.1)	64.6 (18.1)	56.2 (13.4)	51.6 (10.9)	60.7 (15.9)
Mean daily minimum °F (°C)	36.7 (2.6)	38.6 (3.7)	38.6 (3.7)	40.8 (4.9)	44.5 (6.9)	48.5 (9.2)	50.8 (10.4)	51.5 (10.8)	49.4 (9.7)	45.8 (7.7)	41.3 (5.2)	38.6 (3.7)	43.8 (6.6)
Record low °F (°C)	13 (−11)	17 (−8)	25 (−4)	26 (−3)	31 (−1)	31 (−1)	37 (3)	41 (5)	31 (−1)	27 (−3)	22 (−6)	11 (−12)	11 (−12)
Average rainfall inches (mm)	12.26 (311)	9.48 (241)	9.48 (241)	5.38 (137)	3.20 (81)	2.07 (53)	0.57 (14)	1.03 (26)	2.55 (65)	5.84 (148)	10.94 (278)	12.93 (328)	75.73 (1,923)
Average snowfall inches (cm)	1.2 (3.0)	0.2 (0.51)	0.1 (0.25)	0 (0)	0 (0)	0 (0)	0 (0)	0 (0)	0 (0)	0 (0)	0 (0)	0.3 (0.76)	1.8 (4.6)
Average rainy days (≥ 0.01 inch)	21	18	20	16	13	9	4	5	8	13	18	21	166
Source 1:
Source 2:

== Demographics ==
Historical population
Census	Pop.	Note	%±
1920	850		—
1930	1,178		38.6%
1940	1,421		20.6%
1950	2,288		61.0%
1960	2,998		31.0%
1970	4,039		34.7%
1980	4,984		23.4%
1990	4,796		−3.8%
2000	4,378		−8.7%
2010	4,154		−5.1%
2020	4,310		3.8%
U.S. Decennial Census

=== 2020 census ===
As of the 2020 census, Reedsport had a population of 4,310. The median age was 51.5 years. 18.5% of residents were under the age of 18 and 31.1% of residents were 65 years of age or older. For every 100 females there were 95.6 males, and for every 100 females age 18 and over there were 93.9 males age 18 and over.

99.6% of residents lived in urban areas, while 0.4% lived in rural areas.

There were 1,954 households in Reedsport, of which 21.7% had children under the age of 18 living in them. Of all households, 43.0% were married-couple households, 21.0% were households with a male householder and no spouse or partner present, and 28.3% were households with a female householder and no spouse or partner present. About 33.3% of all households were made up of individuals and 20.2% had someone living alone who was 65 years of age or older.

There were 2,183 housing units, of which 10.5% were vacant. Among occupied housing units, 64.2% were owner-occupied and 35.8% were renter-occupied. The homeowner vacancy rate was 2.6% and the rental vacancy rate was 5.5%.

Racial composition as of the 2020 census
Race	Number	Percent
White	3,748	87.0%
Black or African American	10	0.2%
American Indian and Alaska Native	40	0.9%
Asian	46	1.1%
Native Hawaiian and Other Pacific Islander	7	0.2%
Some other race	116	2.7%
Two or more races	343	8.0%
Hispanic or Latino (of any race)	299	6.9%

=== 2010 census ===
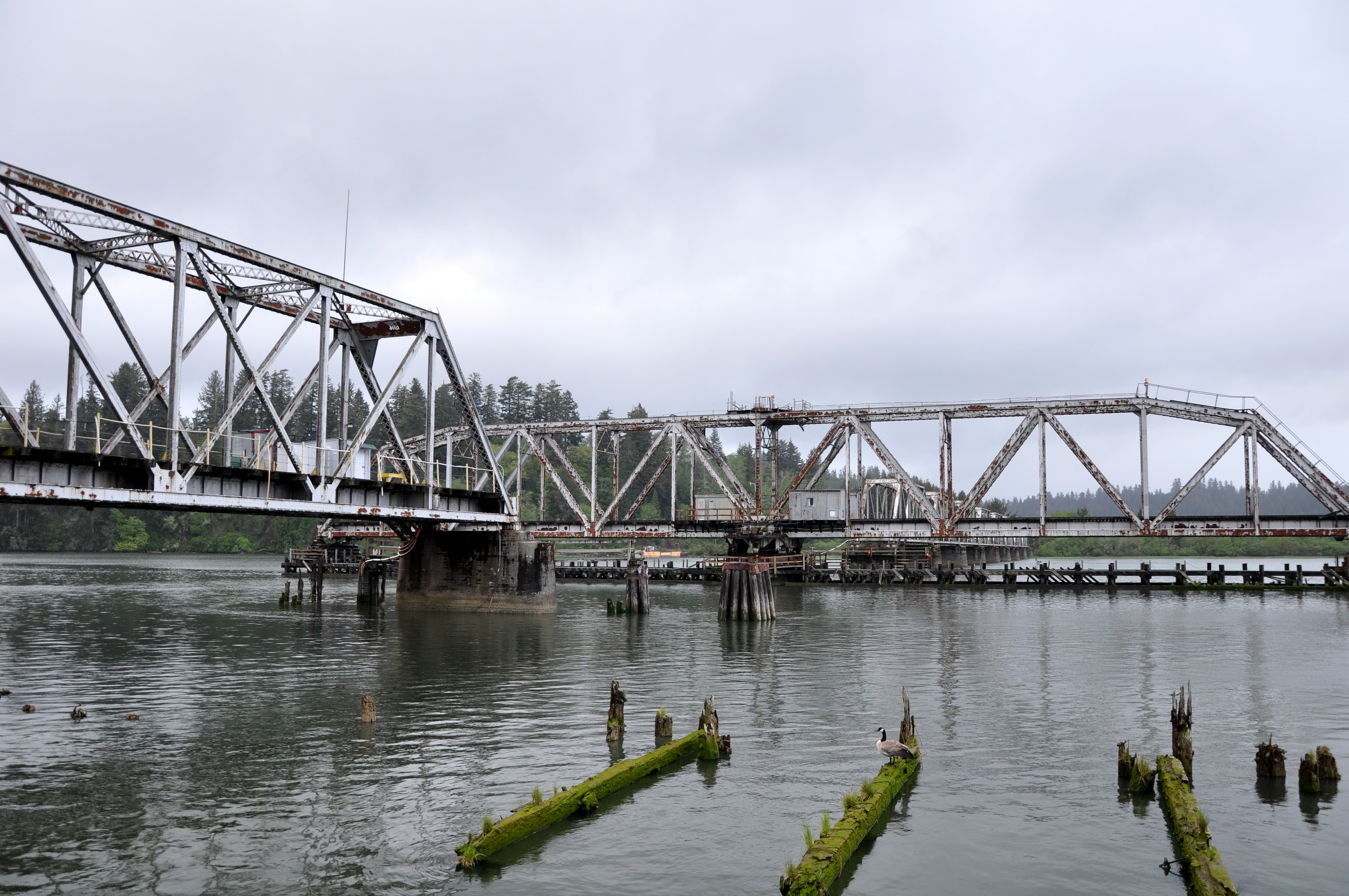
Railway bridge over the Umpqua River at Reedsport

As of the census of 2010, there were 4,154 people, 1,948 households, and 1,138 families residing in the city. The population density was 2,026.3 inhabitants per square mile (782.4/km^{2}). There were 2,207 housing units at an average density of 1,076.6 units per square mile (415.7 units/km^{2}). The racial makeup of the city was 93.0% White, 0.3% African American, 1.1% Native American, 1.1% Asian, 0.1% Pacific Islander, 1.3% from other races, and 3.1% from two or more races. Hispanic or Latino of any race were 4.9% of the population.

There were 1,948 households, of which 20.3% had children under the age of 18 living with them, 44.8% were married couples living together, 8.9% had a female householder with no husband present, 4.8% had a male householder with no wife present, and 41.6% were non-families. 35.5% of all households were made up of individuals, and 18% had someone living alone who was 65 years of age or older. The average household size was 2.11 and the average family size was 2.68.

The median age in the city was 51.2 years. 17.8% of residents were under the age of 18; 7.3% were between the ages of 18 and 24; 17.8% were from 25 to 44; 29.9% were from 45 to 64; and 27.2% were 65 years of age or older. The gender makeup of the city was 49.6% male and 50.4% female.

=== 2000 census ===
As of the census of 2000, there were 4,378 people, 1,978 households, and 1,265 families residing in the city. The population density was 2,126.6 inhabitants per square mile (821.1/km^{2}). There were 2,178 housing units at an average density of 1,057.9 units per square mile (408.5 units/km^{2}). The racial makeup of the city was 93.92% White, 0.02% African American, 1.23% Native American, 0.43% Asian, 0.02% Pacific Islander, 2.15% from other races, and 2.22% from two or more races. Hispanic or Latino of any race were 4.68% of the population.

There were 1,978 households, out of which 23.5% had children under the age of 18 living with them, 52.5% were married couples living together, 7.7% had a female householder with no husband present, and 36.0% were non-families. 32.0% of all households were made up of individuals, and 17.9% had someone living alone who was 65 years of age or older. The average household size was 2.19 and the average family size was 2.71.

In the city, the population was spread out, with 20.6% under the age of 18, 6.3% from 18 to 24, 19.9% from 25 to 44, 27.0% from 45 to 64, and 26.2% who were 65 years of age or older. The median age was 47 years. For every 100 females, there were 93.3 males. For every 100 females age 18 and over, there were 89.6 males.

The median income for a household in the city was $26,054, and the median income for a family was $33,689. Males had a median income of $33,214 versus $20,734 for females. The per capita income for the city was $16,093. About 11.7% of families and 16.0% of the population were below the poverty line, including 21.5% of those under age 18 and 10.9% of those age 65 or over.

== Museums and other points of interest ==
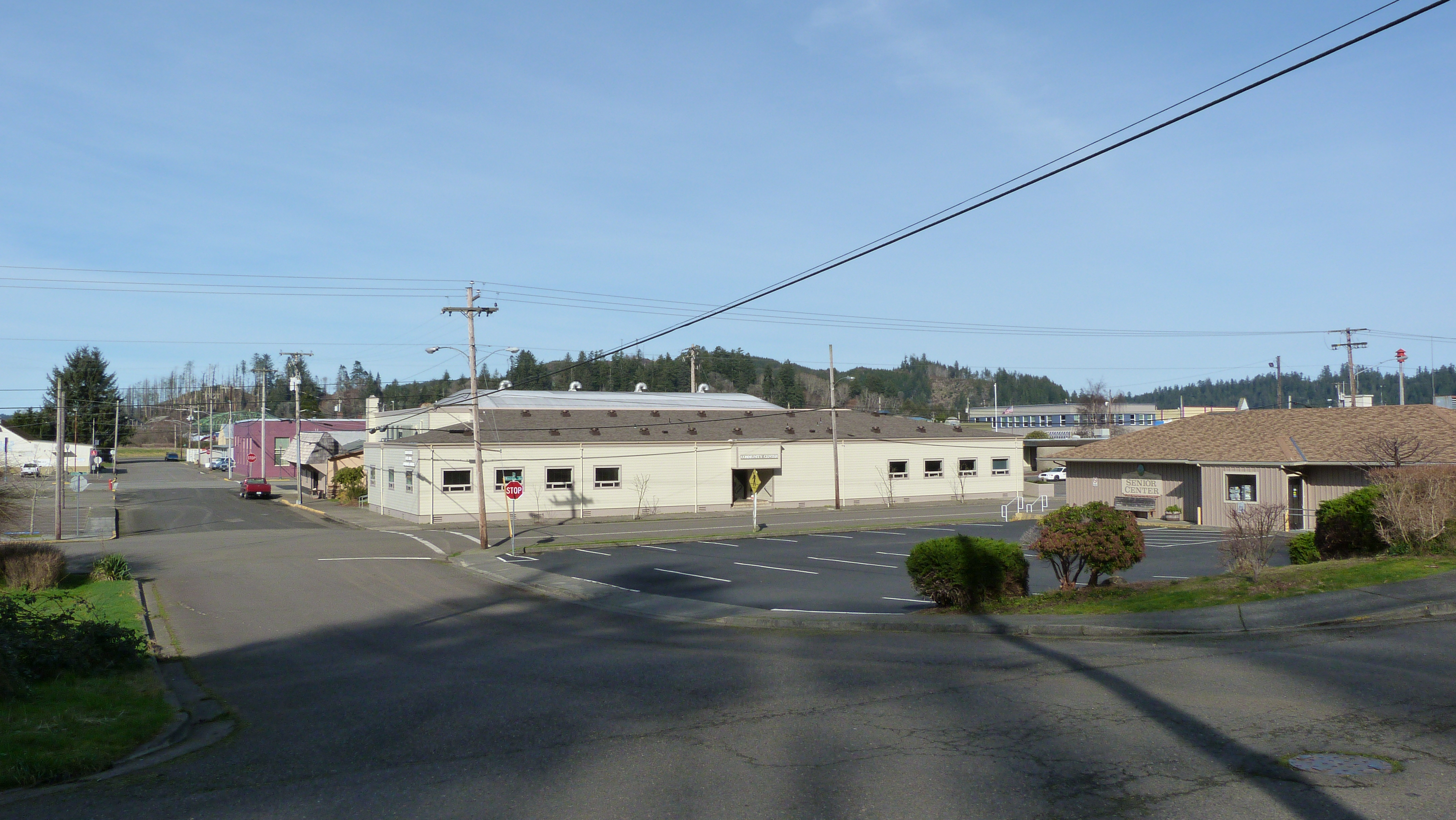
Reedsport City Hall

The Oregon Divisional Chainsaw Sculpting Championships was started in 1999 and held every year since 2000 at the Rainbow Plaza over Fathers Day Weekend. Chainsaw Carvers from three continents compete at the event.

The Umpqua Discovery Center, along the Umpqua River in downtown Reedsport, features regional natural and cultural history information, including interactive media and displays.

The Dean Creek Wildlife Area is 3 miles (5 km) east of Reedsport on Oregon Route 38. This 1,000-acre (4 km^{2}) preserve jointly managed by the Bureau of Land Management and the Oregon Department of Fish and Wildlife provides an opportunity to view 60 to 100 Roosevelt elk in their natural habitat year round.

The Oregon Dunes National Recreation Area interpretive center is located at the intersection of Oregon Route 38 and U.S. Route 101. It features interpretive panels, short films, and information about the local area and attractions.

Loon Lake is 15 miles (24 km) southeast of Reedsport.

On July 20, 2016, Alex Hirsch, creator of the Disney animated series Gravity Falls, released clues for a global scavenger hunt known as Cipher Hunt to find a real-life statue of the show's villain, Bill Cipher. The statue was finally discovered on August 2, 2016, in the woods south of Reedsport Community Charter School, but it was removed from the property the next morning. It was formerly located at 43.689551°N 124.115804°W. It was later moved to Bicentennial Park and then it was moved again to Confusion Hill.

== Education ==
Reedsport is served by the two-school Reedsport School District, which includes Highland Elementary School and Reedsport Community Charter School.

== Media ==
=== Radio ===
- KDUN (1030 AM)
- KJMX (99.5 FM)
- KSYD (92.1 FM+HD)

== Renewable energy ==
Plans for a 100-buoy commercial wave park in the ocean near Reedsport fell through in 2014, when Ocean Power Technologies (OPT), a renewable energy company based in New Jersey, abandoned the project. The park, which would have been built in an area known for high-value fishing and crabbing, was opposed by the Oregon Dungeness Crab Commission. OPT listed high costs, technical challenges, and complicated negotiations with governments and stakeholders among its reasons for cancelling the project. As of 2014, OPT still had plans for a much smaller project near Reedsport.

== Notable people ==
- Jason Boe, politician
- Wally Borrevik, professional basketball player
- Delilah Rene Luke, radio personality
- Vicki Walker, politician

== See also ==
- Steamboats of the Oregon Coast
