= List of lakes of Oregon =

This is a list of the lakes and reservoirs of Oregon. Swimming, fishing, and/or boating are permitted in some of these lakes, but not all.

Name	Description
Lake Abert	a large, shallow lake in central Lake County
Agate Lake	an impoundment of Dry Creek
Agency Lake	connected to Upper Klamath Lake
Lake Allison	former lake filling the Willamette Valley to a depth of 300 to 400 feet (91 to 122 m)
Alvord Lake	a terminus for streams near the Alvord Desert
Aneroid Lake	in the Eagle Cap Wilderness
Antelope Flat Reservoir	in central Oregon, an impoundment of Bear Creek
Antelope Reservoir	near Jordan Valley
Anthony Lakes	also known as North Powder Lakes, in the Elkhorn Mountains
Applegate Lake	a flood-control reservoir on the Applegate River
Aspen Lake	in the southern Cascade Range, just west of Klamath Falls
Baert Lake	an artificial lake in the Christmas Valley
Lake Billy Chinook	an impoundment of the Crooked, Deschutes, and Metolius rivers by the Round Butte Dam near The Cove Palisades State Park
Big Cliff Reservoir	a re-regulation reservoir below Detroit Lake
Blue Lake	three overlapping craters, which hold Blue Lake
Blue Lake	a recreational lake in Fairview
Blue River Reservoir	an impoundment of the Blue River, a tributary of the McKenzie River
Lake Bonneville	an impoundment on the Columbia River formed by Bonneville Dam
Bonny Lakes	two ponds in the Eagle Cap Wilderness
Borax Lake	an alkali lake in Harney County, home to the Borax Lake chub
Botens Reservoir	a small reservoir located in the northwestern portion of the Klamath Basin
Breitenbush Lake	straddles the Cascade crest in the Warm Springs Reservation and headwaters of some of the Breitenbush River
Buckeye Lake	a lake in the Rogue-Umpqua Divide Wilderness near Fish Lake, visible from Grasshopper Mountain
Bull Run Lake	an impoundment of the Bull Run River northwest of Mount Hood, Portland's primary drinking water source
Bully Creek Reservoir	an impoundment of Bully Creek, a tributary of the Malheur River
Burnt Lake	in the Sandy River watershed
Bybee Lake	in the Columbia Slough watershed
Cabin Lake	a small, seasonally dry lake southeast of Newberry Volcano and a popular place for birdwatching
Camp Lake	a small lake at 6,975 ft (2,126 m) in elevation, northeast of South Sister
Cascade Lakes	a group of mountain lakes south of Mount Bachelor
Lake Celilo	an artificial lake of the Columbia River created by The Dalles Dam
Christmas Lake	a seasonally dry lake in the Christmas Valley
Clear Lake	the name of at least ten Oregon lakes
Cleawox Lake	dammed by sand dunes along the Oregon Coast near Florence
Cooper Creek Reservoir	near Sutherlin in the upper Umpqua River basin
Chickahominy Reservoir	an impoundment of Chickahominy Creek near Riley
Cottage Grove Reservoir	an impoundment of the Coast Fork Willamette River created by Cottage Grove Dam
Cougar Reservoir	an impoundment of the McKenzie River created by Cougar Dam
Crane Prairie Reservoir	a 5.34 sq mi (13.8 km^{2}) reservoir in Deschutes County and one of the largest rainbow trout fisheries in Oregon
Crater Lake	the second deepest lake in the Western Hemisphere and the eighth deepest in the world, excluding Lake Vostok in Antarctica
Crescent Lake	north of the town of Chemult in Klamath County
Cullaby Lake	a 1.7-mile (2.7 km) long north–south lake east of US 101 adjacent to Sunset Beach near Warrenton in Clatsop County
Cultus Lake	a mountain lake in the Deschutes River watershed, near the Cascade Lakes Scenic Byway
Davis Lake	a mountain lake southeast of Oakridge in the Cascade Range
Deep Lake (Oregon)	the name of at least five lakes and two lakebeds
Delintment Lake	Malheur National Forest, Harney County
Detroit Lake	an impoundment of the Breitenbush and Santiam rivers by Detroit Dam
Devils Lake	a small lake adjacent to the Cascade Lakes Scenic Byway
Devils Lake	the source of the D River, one of the shortest rivers in the world
Dexter Reservoir	also known as Dexter Lake, an impoundment of the Middle Fork Willamette River created by Dexter Dam
Diamond Lake	about 10 mi (16 km) north of Crater Lake, between Mount Bailey and Mount Thielsen
Dollar Lake	in the Eagle Cap Wilderness
Donaca Lake	in the Middle Santiam Wilderness
Dorena Reservoir	an impoundment of the Row River created by Dorena Dam
Doris Lake	a deep, high-elevation lake in Deschutes County
East Lake	one of two crater lakes at Newberry Volcano
Eel Lake	a large coastal lake near Lakeside in Coos County
E. E. Wilson Lake	
Elk Lake	a small lake along the Cascade Lakes Scenic Byway
Emigrant Lake	an impoundment of Emigrant Creek in Jackson County
Lake Ewauna	headwaters of the Klamath River
Fairview Lake	in the Columbia Slough watershed
Fern Ridge Reservoir	also known as Fern Ridge Lake, an impoundment on the Long Tom River in Lane County
Fish Lake (Harney County, Oregon)	located within the Steens Mountain Wilderness at an elevation of over 7300 feet (2225 meters), source of Lake Creek and endpoint of Lake Creek Canyon
Fish Lake (Jackson County, Oregon)	formerly a natural lake, now an impoundment of the north fork of Little Butte Creek
Fish Lake (Marion County, Oregon)	a 20-acre (8.1 ha) lake in the Cascades near Olallie Lake
Fish Hawk Lake	a private lake in Clatsop County near Birkenfeld
Flagstaff Lake	one of the Warner Lakes in southeastern Lake County
Floras Lake	natural lake behind dunes between Cape Blanco and Bandon
Fossil Lake	a seasonally dry lake in northern Lake County
Foster Reservoir	an impoundment on the South Santiam River created by Foster Dam
Fourmile Lake	an impoundment of Fourmile Creek
Frog Lake (Oregon)	the name for at least nine lakes, reservoirs, and related features
Gerber Reservoir	an impoundment on Miller Creek created by Gerber Dam
Goose Lake	in Oregon and California, formerly the headwaters of the Pit River
Green Peter Reservoir	an impoundment of the Middle Santiam River created by Green Peter Dam
Guild's Lake	a lake formerly in NW Portland between NW Yeon and St. Helens Road
Lake Harriet	an impoundment of the Oak Grove Fork Clackamas River
Harney Lake	a natural, occasionally vanishing lake which merges with Malheur Lake in times of high water
Hells Canyon Reservoir	an impoundment of the Snake River
Henry Hagg Lake	a 1,200-acre (4.9 km^{2}) reservoir in the foothills of the Coast Range, just west of Forest Grove; an impoundment of Scoggins Creek, a tributary of the Tualatin River in Washington County
Hills Creek Reservoir	an impoundment of the Middle Fork Willamette River created by Hills Creek Dam
Hosmer Lake	a small lake just off the Cascade Lakes Scenic Byway
Howard Prairie Lake	a reservoir east of Ashland in Jackson County
Hyatt Reservoir	an impoundment of Keene Creek southwest of Howard Prairie Lake
Island Lake	an alpine lake in the Sky Lakes Wilderness
John C. Boyle Reservoir	a former impoundment on the upper Klamath River formed by John C. Boyle Dam
Jubilee Lake	an impoundment of Motett Creek in Union County north of Elgin and a popular recreation site in the Umatilla National Forest
Junipers Reservoir	an artificial lake west of Lakeview and the mouth of Lake County's Muddy Creek
Lake of the Woods (Oregon)	a natural lake west of Upper Klamath Lake and southeast of Mount McLoughlin
Langdon Lake	an impoundment of Morning Creek and source of Lookingglass Creek, a tributary of the Grande Ronde River
Lava Lake	a small lake along the Cascade Lakes Scenic Byway
Legore Lake	in the Eagle Cap Wilderness, the highest true lake in Oregon at 8,950 feet (2,730 m) elevation
Leaburg Reservoir	an impoundment of the McKenzie River near Leaburg
Lemolo Lake	an impoundment of the North Umpqua River about 10 miles (16 km) north of Diamond Lake
Little Crater Lake	a tiny lake which about as deep as it is wide, northeast of Timothy Lake
Little Cultus Lake	a small lake near the Cascade Lakes Scenic Byway
Little Lava Lake	a small lake the head of the Deschutes River and near the Cascade Lakes Scenic Byway
Little Three Creeks Lake	a small lake very close to Three Creeks Lake Near Sisters
Lofton Reservoir	an impoundment within the Fremont–Winema National Forest
Lookout Point Reservoir	an impoundment of the Middle Fork Willamette River by Lookout Point Dam
Loon Lake	a 216-acre (0.87 km^{2}) lake in the Coast Range 15.5 miles (24.9 km) ESE of Reedsport
Lost Creek Lake	an impoundment on the Rogue River
Lost Lake	a name for at least 20 lakes in Oregon
Maidu Lake	source of the North Umpqua River, in Douglas County
Magone Lake	in the Malheur National Forest north of John Day
Malheur Lake	the terminus of the Donner und Blitzen River and the Silvies River
Malheur Reservoir	an irrigation impoundment on Willow Creek (Malheur River)
Mann Lake	the largest playa lake in the north Alvord Valley, Harney County
Marion Lake	in the Mount Jefferson Wilderness, the largest wilderness lake in Oregon
McGuire Reservoir	an impoundment of the Nestucca River
McKay Reservoir	an impoundment of McKay Creek, a tributary of the Umatilla River.
Medco Pond	a lake in Jackson County, Oregon
Miller Lake	natural lake near Pacific Crest Trail west of Chemult, Oregon
Minam Lake	reservoir in Eagle Cap Wilderness; source of Lostine and Minam rivers
Mink Lake (Lane County, Oregon)	second-largest wilderness lake in Oregon
Mirror Lake (Clackamas County, Oregon)	a mountain lake southwest of Mount Hood, located at the foot of Tom Dick and Harry Mountain
Mirror Pond	an impoundment of the Deschutes River in central Bend
Lake Modoc	a former lake on the Klamath River
Morgan Lake	a lake outside La Grande, Union County
Mud Lake	nineteen Oregon lakes share this name, but are distributed throughout the state
North Fork Reservoir	an impoundment of the Clackamas River
North Tenmile Lake	adjacent to Tenmile Lake near Reedsport
Nuss Lake	a small lake in Klamath County, Oregon
Ochoco Reservoir	a reservoir east of Prineville, Oregon
Odell Lake	a mountain lake southeast of Willamette Pass
Olallie Lake	a mountain lake 10 miles (16 km) north of Mount Jefferson
Oswego Lake	a natural lake (though artificially enlarged) that is a former channel of the Tualatin River
Owyhee Reservoir	an impoundment of the Owyhee River by Owyhee Dam in Eastern Oregon; Oregon's longest lake (52 miles (84 km))
Paulina Lake	one of two crater lakes in Newberry Caldera
Phillips Lake	an impoundment of the Powder River
Perkins Lake	a lake in Douglas County
Pine Hollow Reservoir	impoundments of Threemile and Pine Hollow creeks, located 45.24858°N 121.29338°W two miles NW of Wamic, Oregon
Pine Ridge Lake	a lake in Linn County with a scout camp on its shores
Prineville Reservoir	an impoundment of the Crooked River by Arthur R. Bowman Dam in central Crook County
River Mill Hydroelectric Project and River Mill Dam	an impoundment of the Clackamas River abeam Estacada and producing electricity since 1911
Rock Creek Lake	alpine lake on northern slope of Rock Creek Butte
Santiam Lake	headwaters of the North Santiam River in southwestern Mount Jefferson Wilderness
Siltcoos Lake	largest lake dammed by sand dunes along the Oregon coast; near Florence
Silver Lake	SE Oregon within the Great Basin
Silverton Reservoir	an impoundment of Silver Creek
Smith Lake	in the Columbia Slough watershed
Sparks Lake	mountain lake west of Mount Bachelor and along the Cascade Lakes Scenic Byway
Strawberry Lake	biggest lake in the Strawberry Mountain Wilderness near Prairie City
Summer Lake	SE Oregon within the Great Basin
Summit Lake	There are at least seven Summit Lakes in Oregon, and at least two communities
Suttle Lake	A lake on the east side of Santiam Pass
Tahkenitch Lake	Between Reedsport and Florence, dammed by sand dunes along the Oregon coast.
Teardrop Pool	a small lake on the summit of the South Sister, Oregon's highest lake at 10,400 feet (3,200 m) elevation, 44.10255°N 121.77199°W
Tenmile Lake (Oregon)	Largest lake in the Tenmile Creek basin near Reedsport
Thief Valley Reservoir	an impoundment on the Powder River
Thorn Lake	a seasonally dry lake in Christmas Valley
Three Creeks Lake	a warm lake near Sisters popular for Trout fishing
Timothy Lake	an impoundment of the Oak Grove Fork Clackamas River
Timpanogas Lake	the headwaters of the Middle Fork Willamette River
Todd Lake	A small, yet popular lake along the Cascade Lakes Scenic Byway
Triangle Lake	A small lake 22 miles (35 km) west of Cheshire
Trillium Lake	a historic artificial lake
Twin Lakes	two small lakes along the Elkhorn Mountains
Upper Klamath Lake	Oregon's largest lake by surface area, located near the California border, fed by the Williamson River (Oregon), and drained by the Link River into Lake Ewauna
North and South Twin Lakes	two small lakes near the Cascade Lakes Scenic Byway
Lake Umatilla	impoundment of the Columbia River formed by the John Day Dam
Wahtum Lake	a small lake on the NNW flank of Mount Hood
Waldo Lake	headwaters of the North Fork Middle Fork Willamette River
Lake Wallula	impoundment of the Columbia River formed by McNary Dam
Warm Springs Reservoir	an impoundment of the Malheur River
Walling Pond	A public use, privately owned fishing pond in Salem
Walter Wirth Lake	A former gravel pit turned fishing pond in Salem
Walton Lake	A lake in Ochoco National Forest
Wallowa Lake	A melted glacier near Joseph
Wickiup Reservoir	A reservoir south of Mount Bachelor
Willow Creek Lake	formed by Willow Creek Dam impounding Willow Creek near Heppner
Woahink Lake	Deepest lake (relative to sea level) dammed by sand dunes along the Oregon coast; near Florence

== Gallery ==
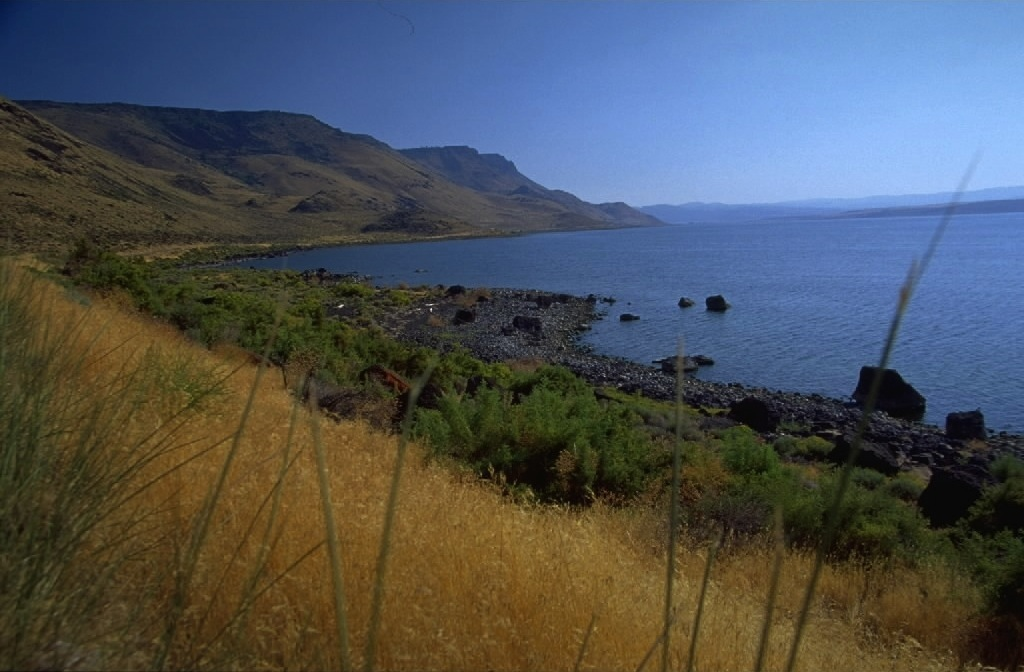
Lake Abert and the Abert Rim

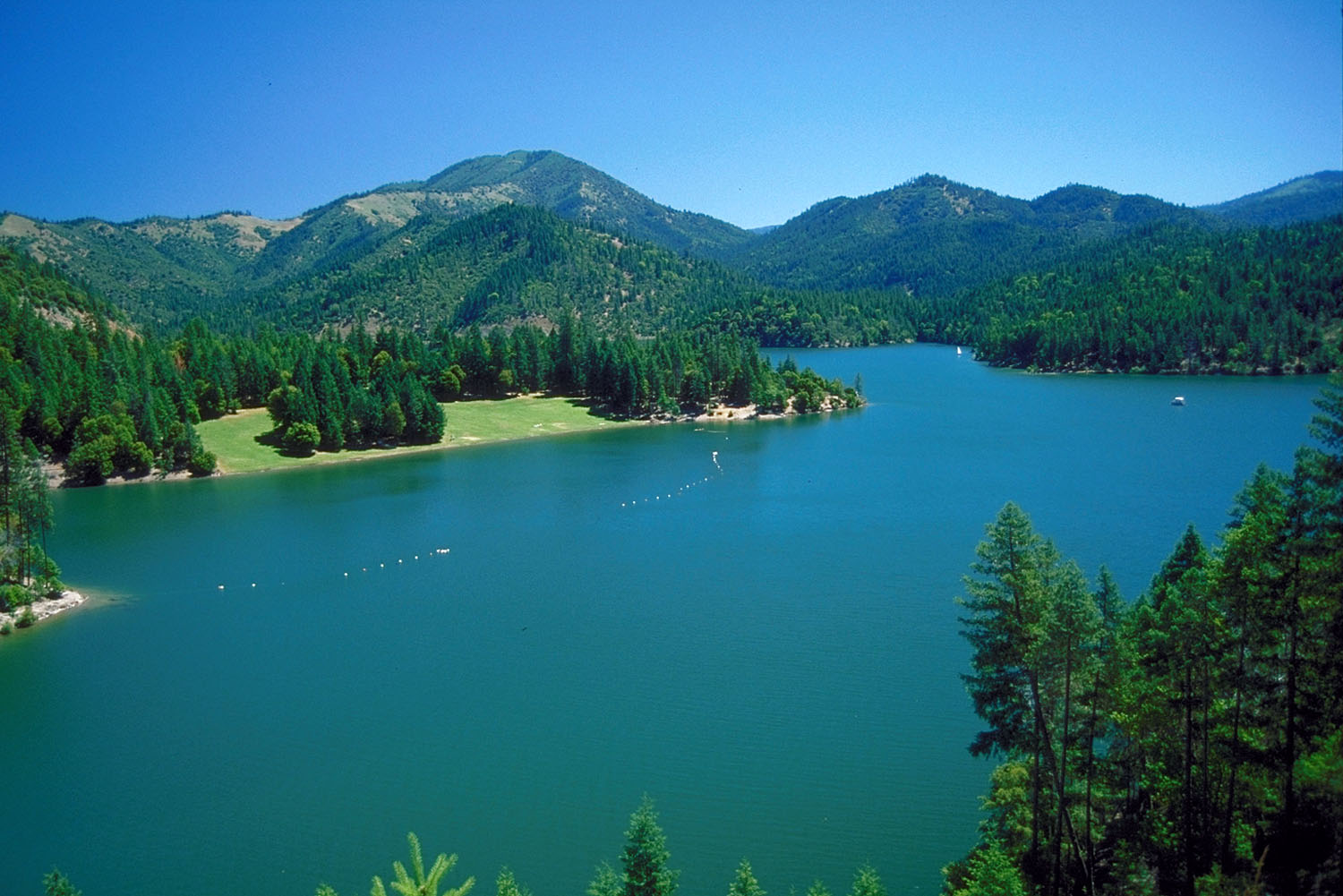
Applegate Lake in Jackson County

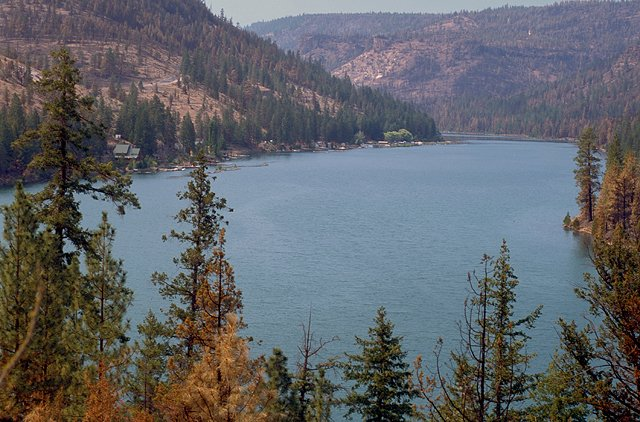
Lake Billy Chinook

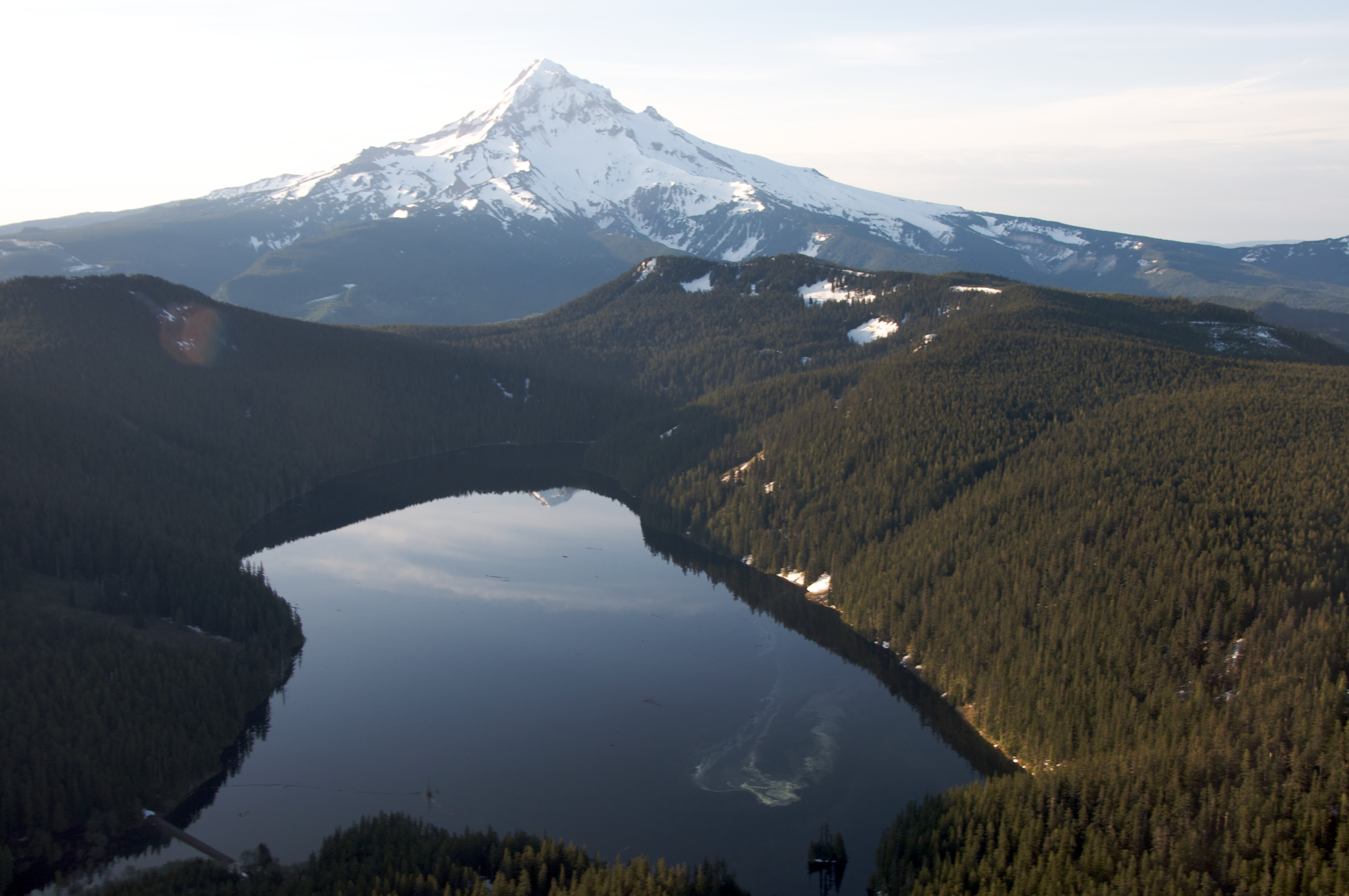
Bull Run Lake and Mount Hood

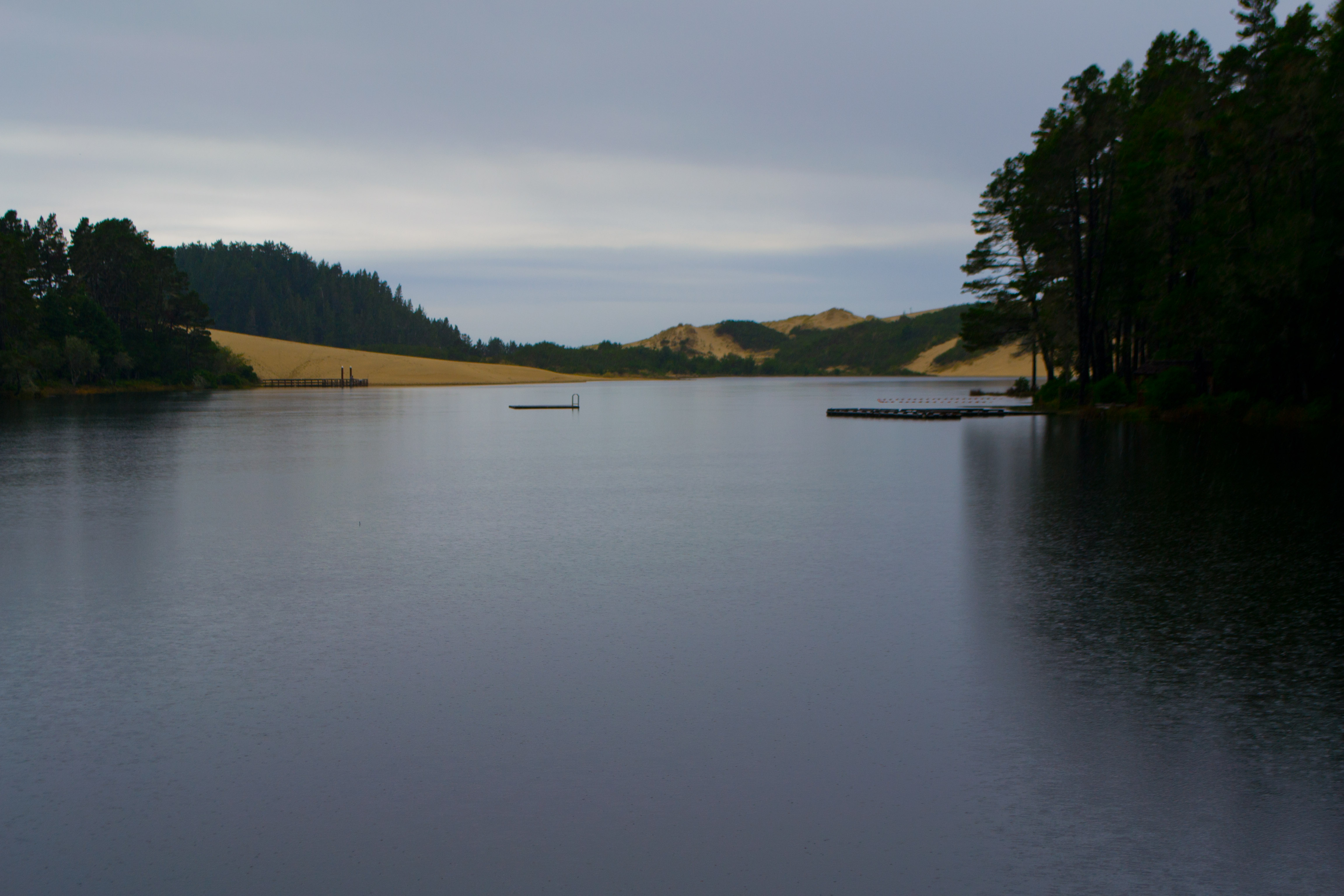
Cleawox Lake on the coast

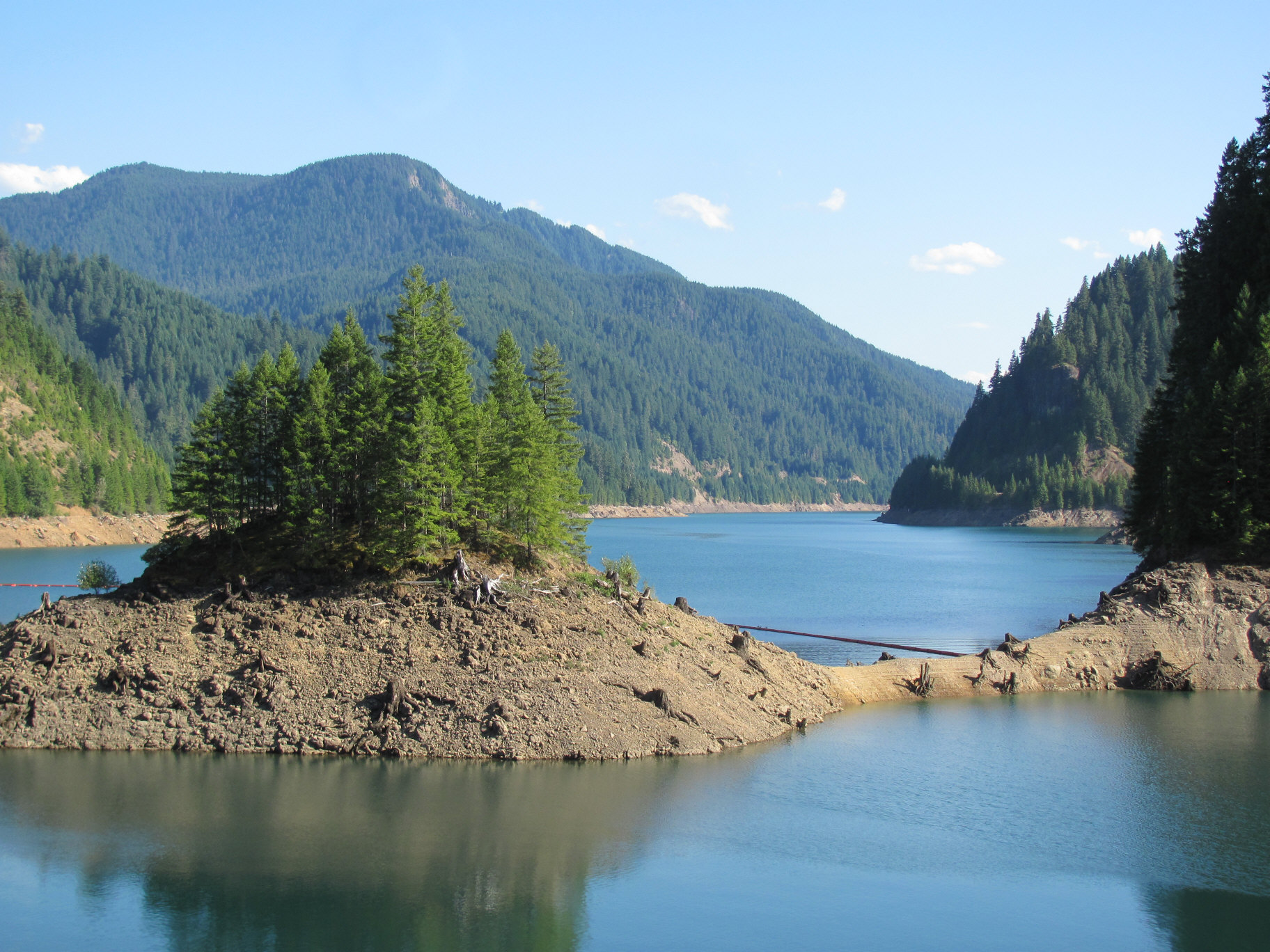
Cougar Reservoir on the South Fork McKenzie River

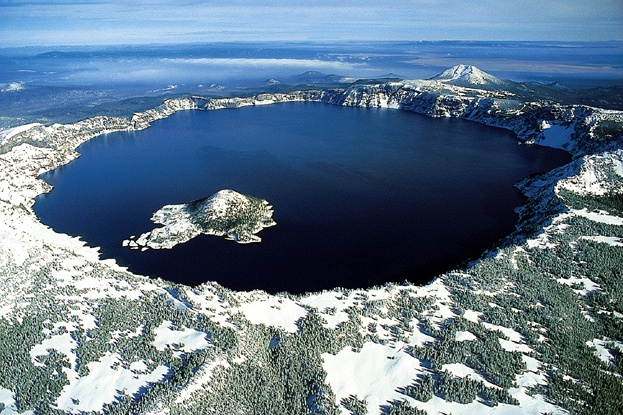
Crater Lake

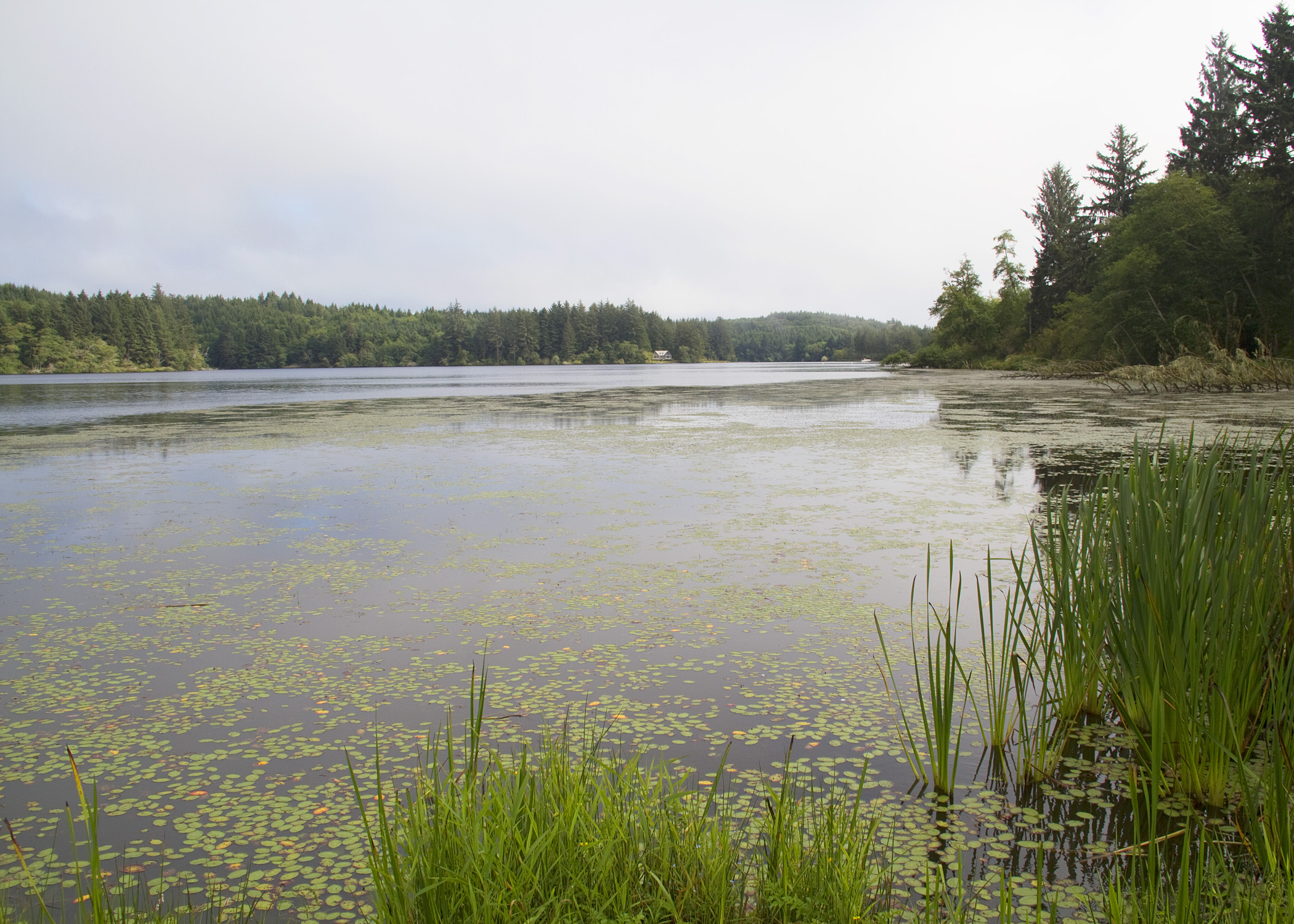
Cullaby Lake in Clatsop County

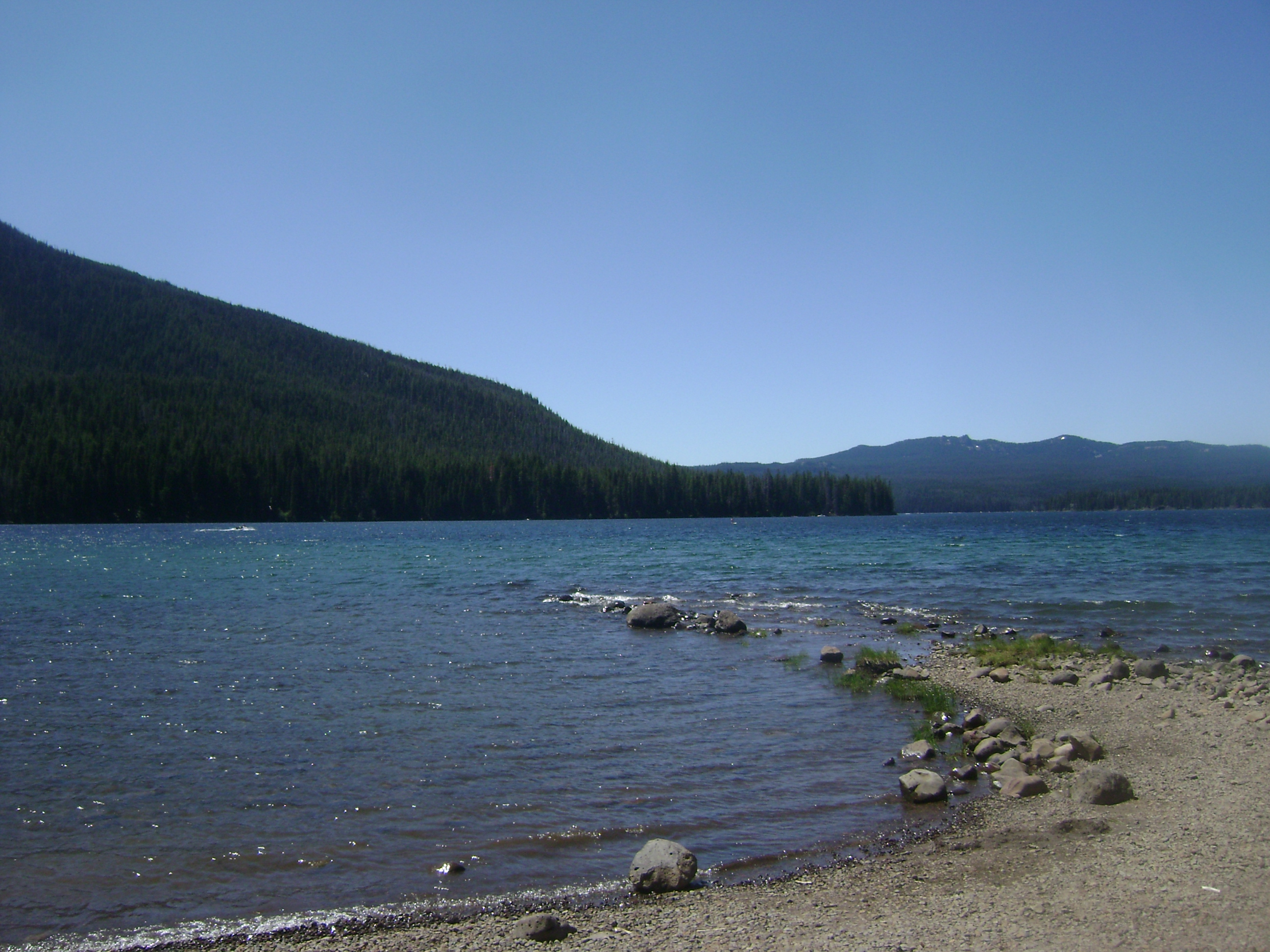
Cultus Lake in Deschutes County

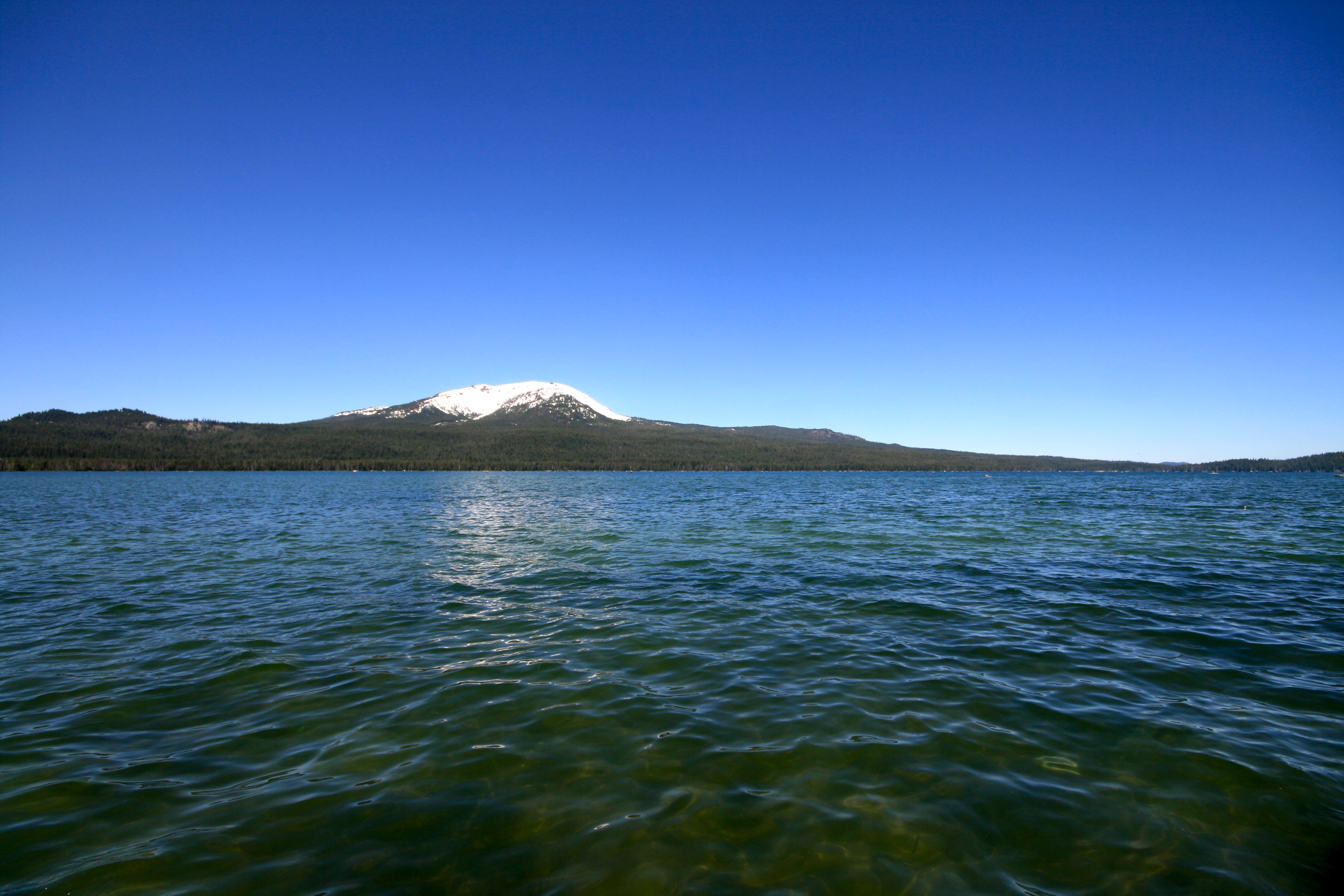
Diamond Lake and Mount Bailey

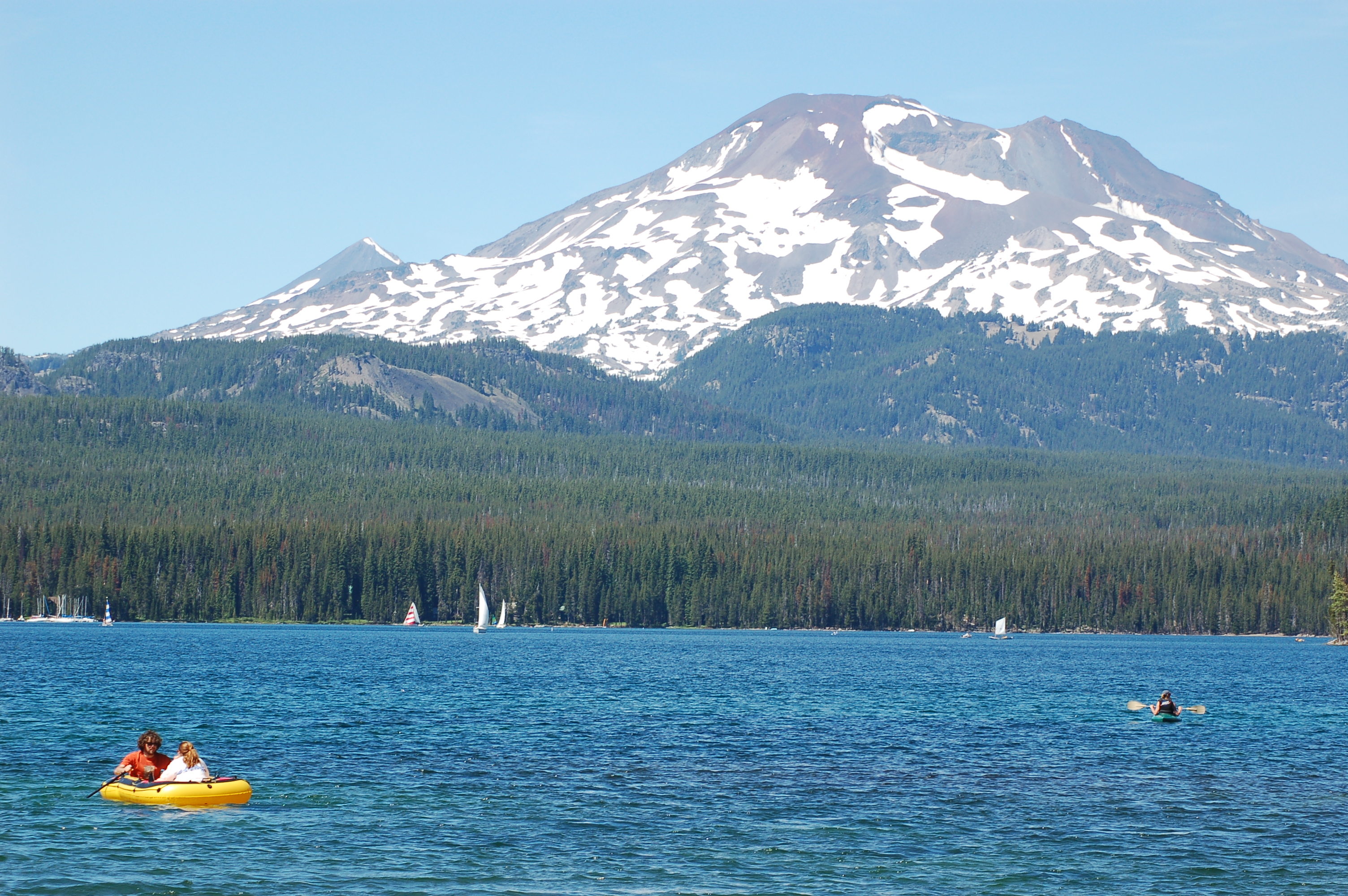
Elk Lake and South Sister

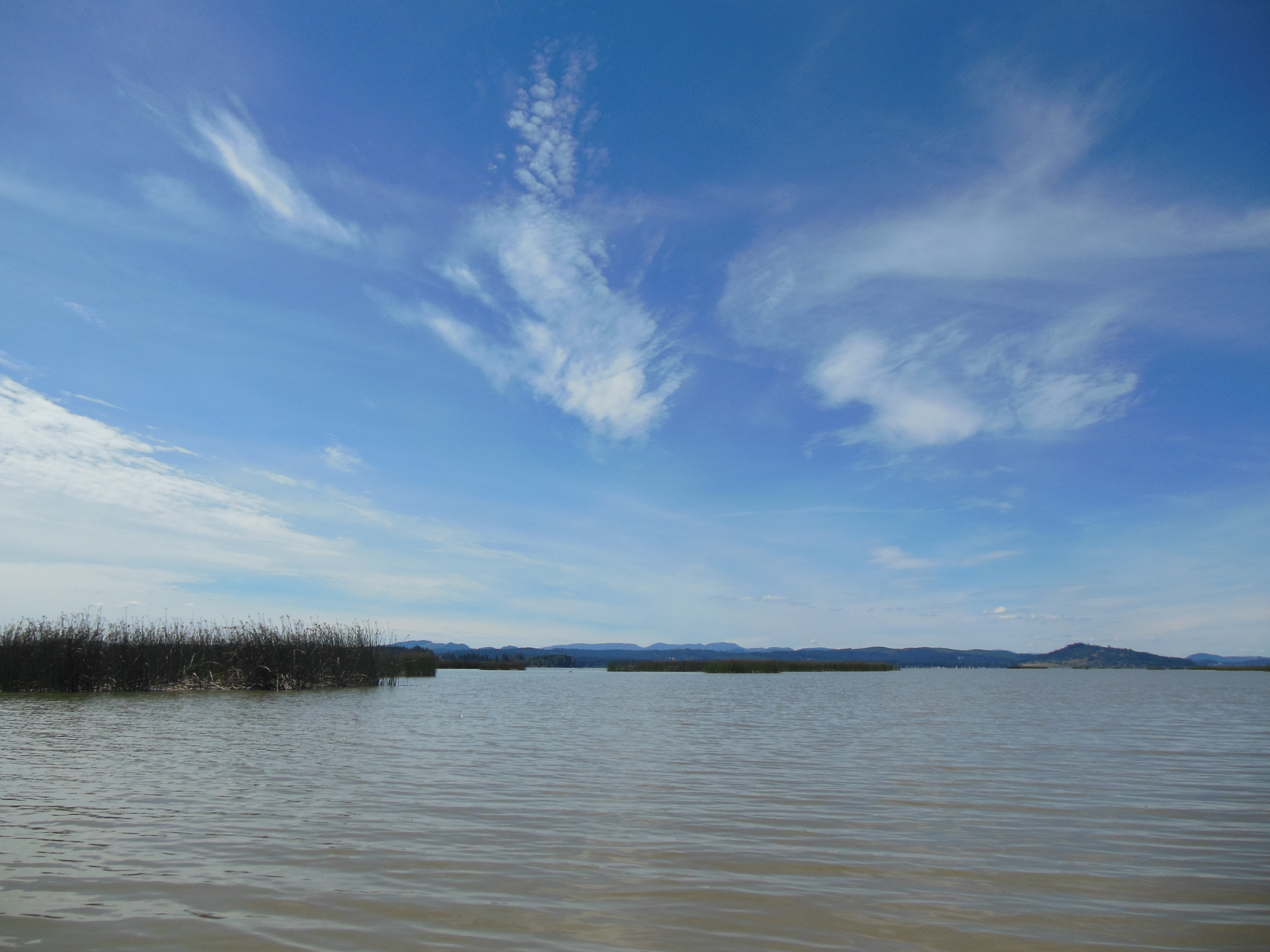
Fern Ridge Reservoir on the Long Tom River in Lane County

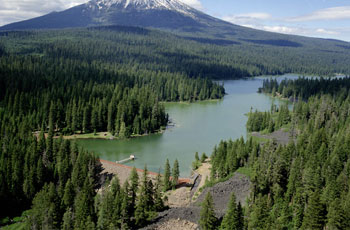
Fish Lake with Mount McLoughlin in the background

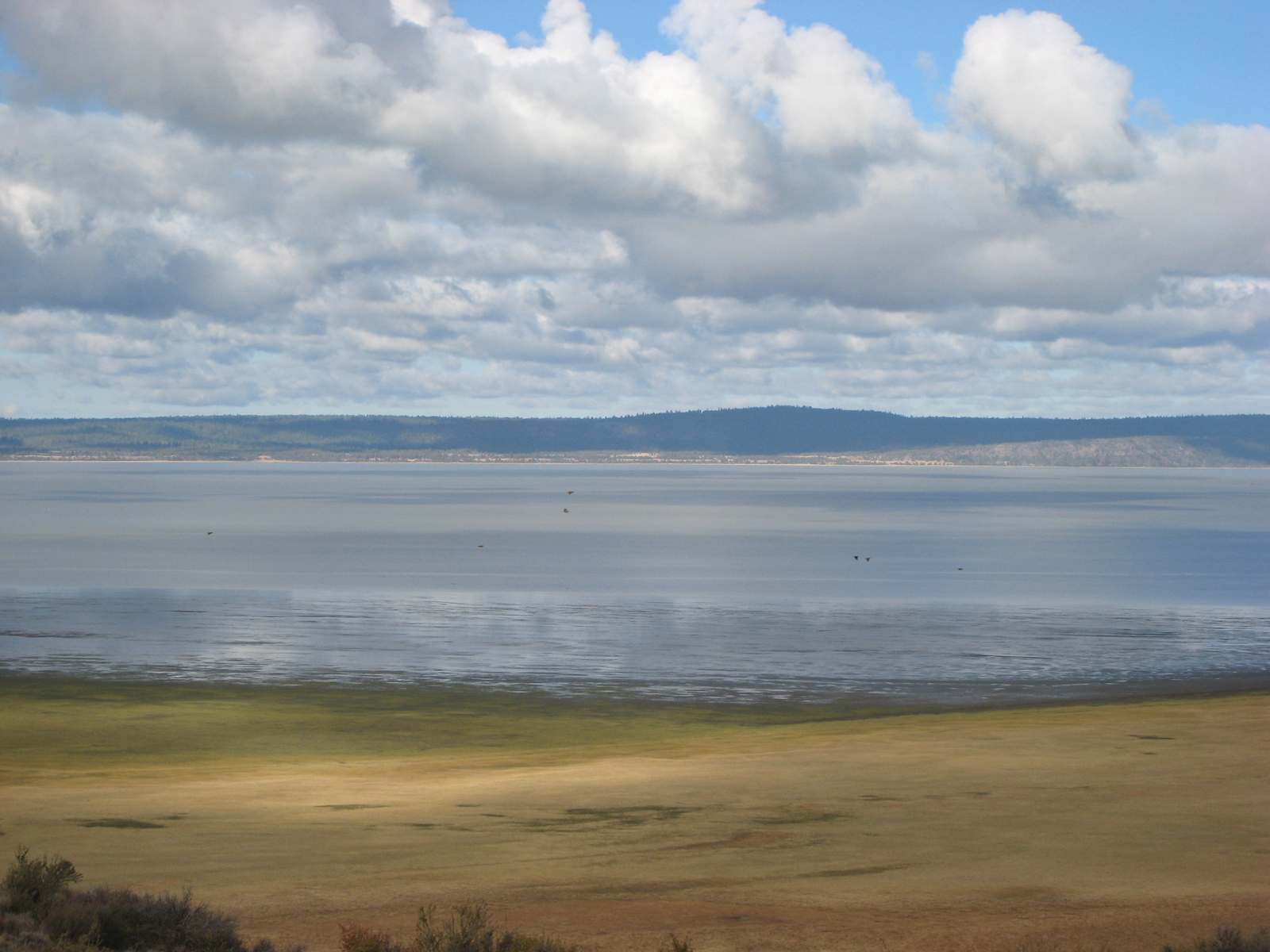
Goose Lake on the Oregon–California border

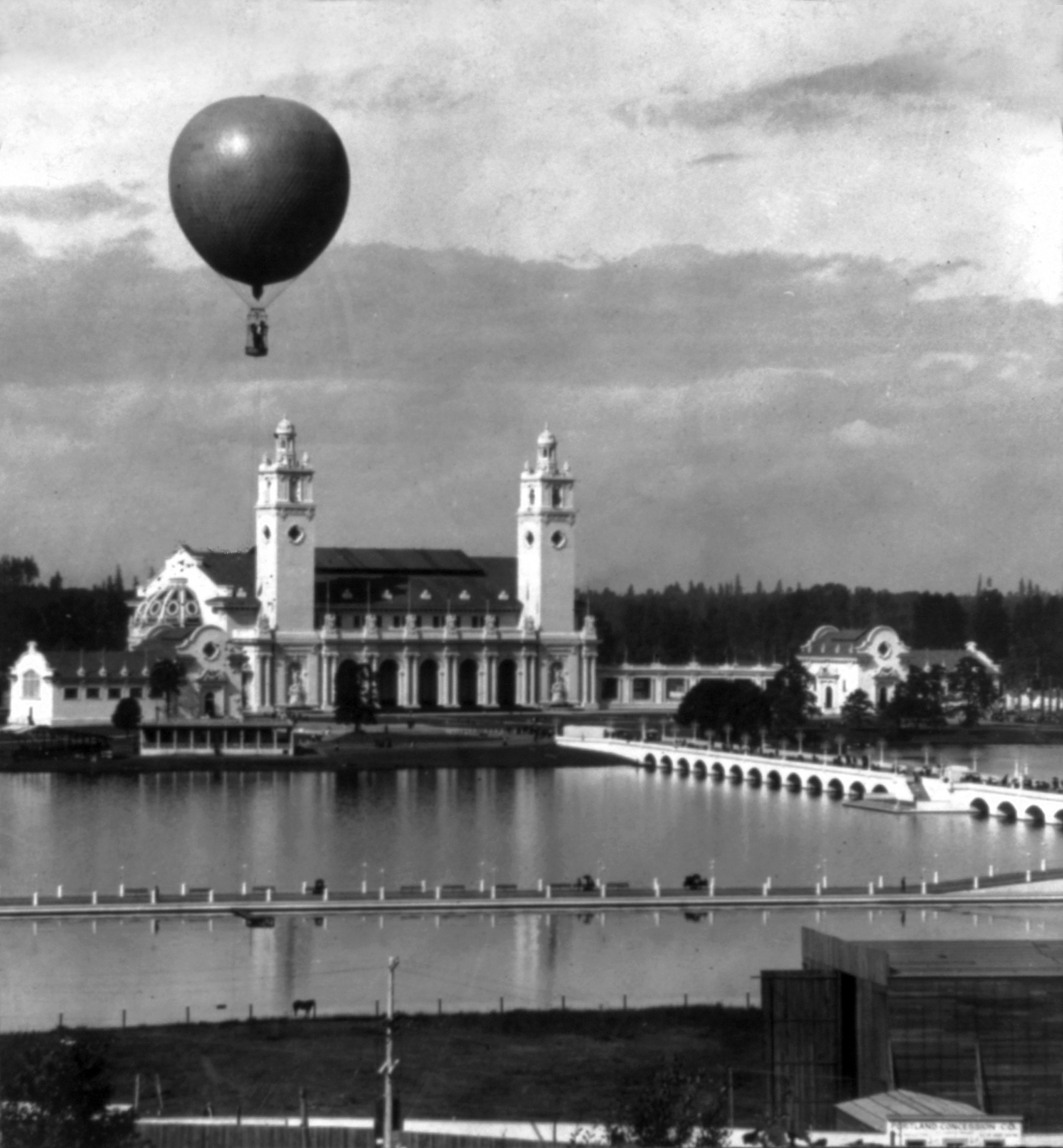
Guild's Lake at the 1905 Exposition, shortly before it was buried

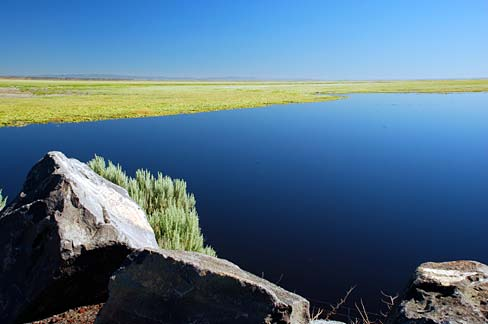
Malheur Lake in Harney County

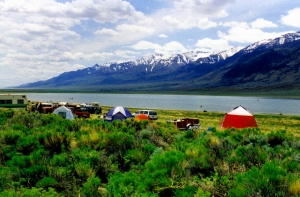
Mann Lake in Harney County

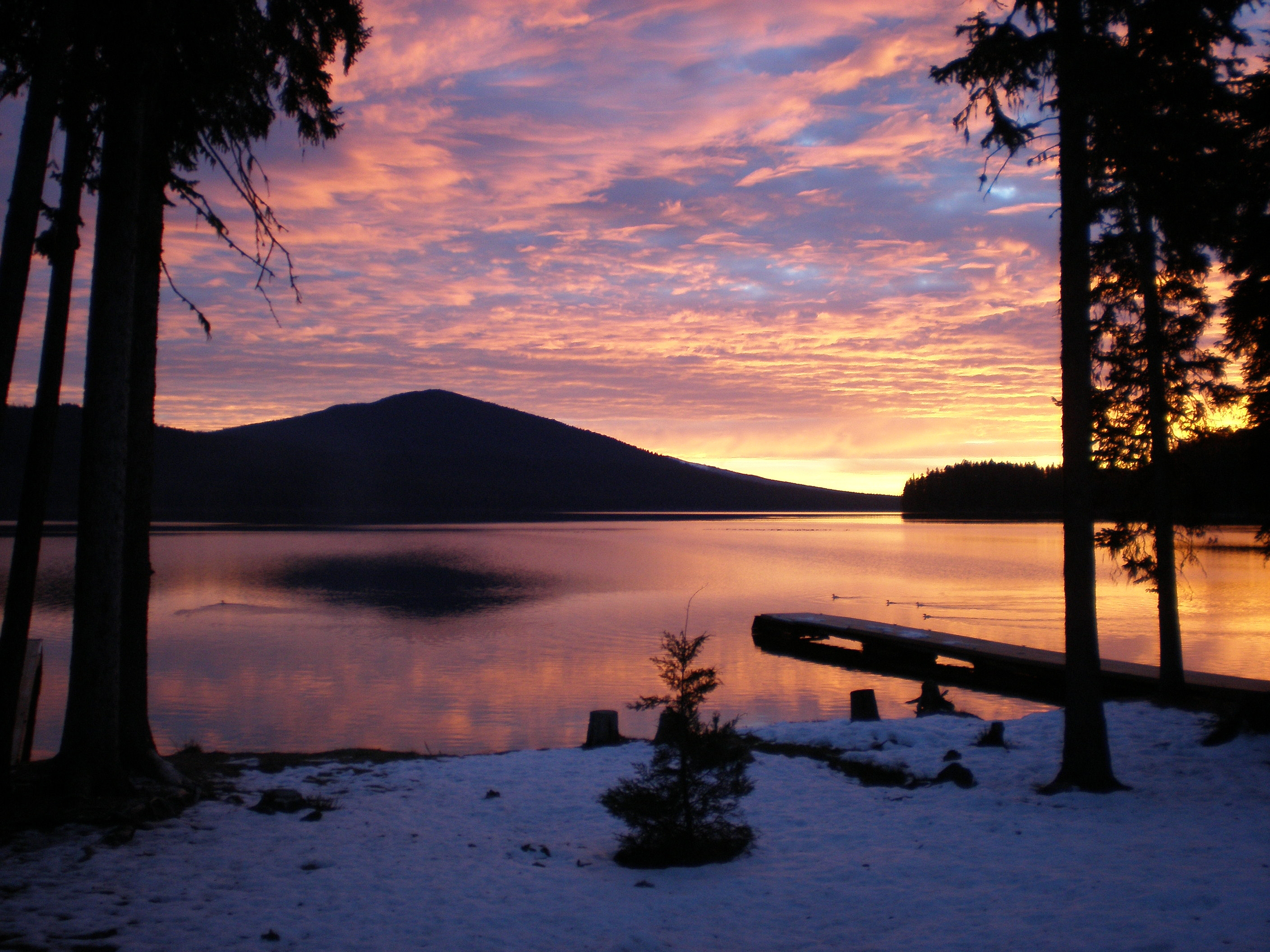
Odell Lake at sunrise

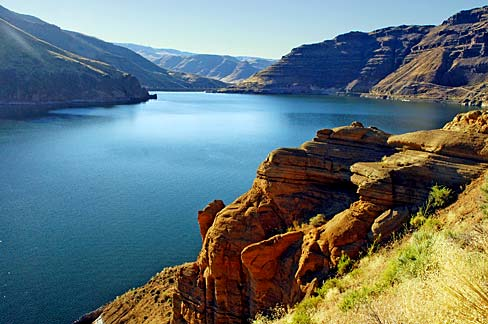
Owyhee Reservoir, a long and narrow reservoir on the Owyhee River

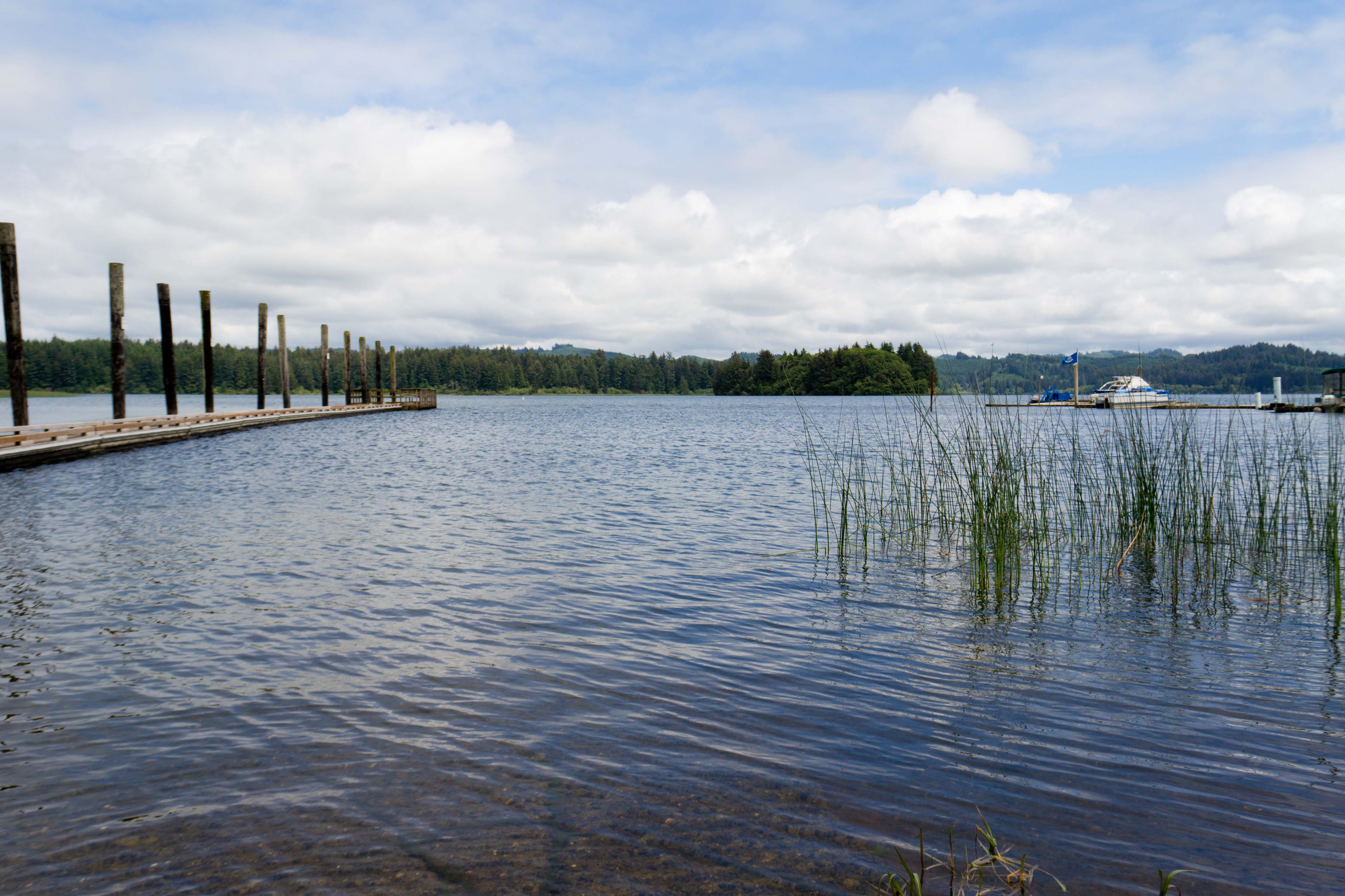
Siltcoos Lake on the central coast

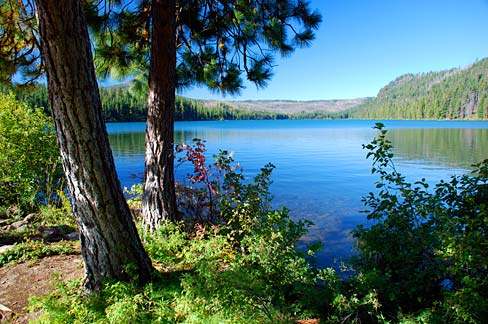
Suttle Lake in the Deschutes National Forest

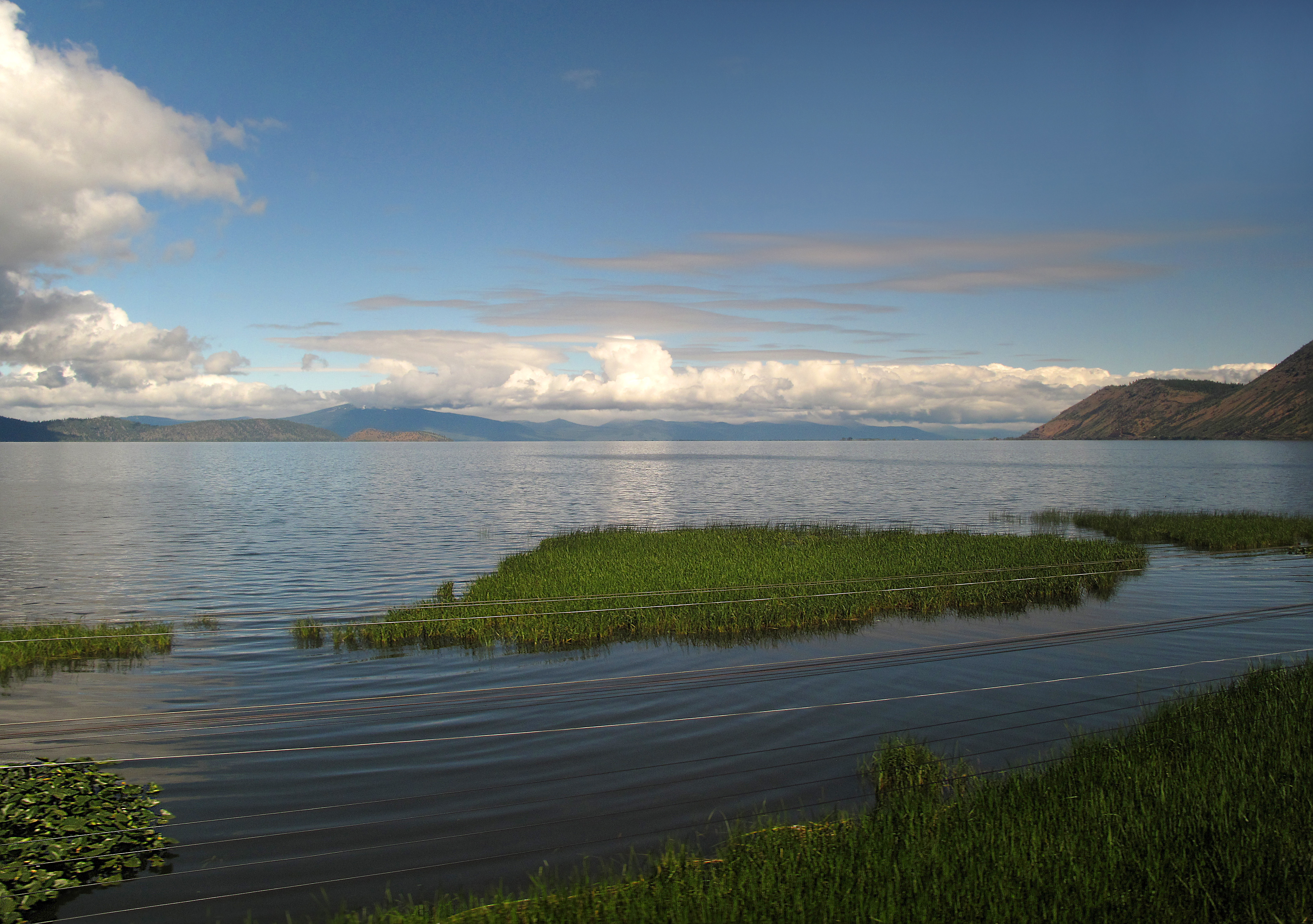
Upper Klamath Lake, Oregon's largest lake by surface area

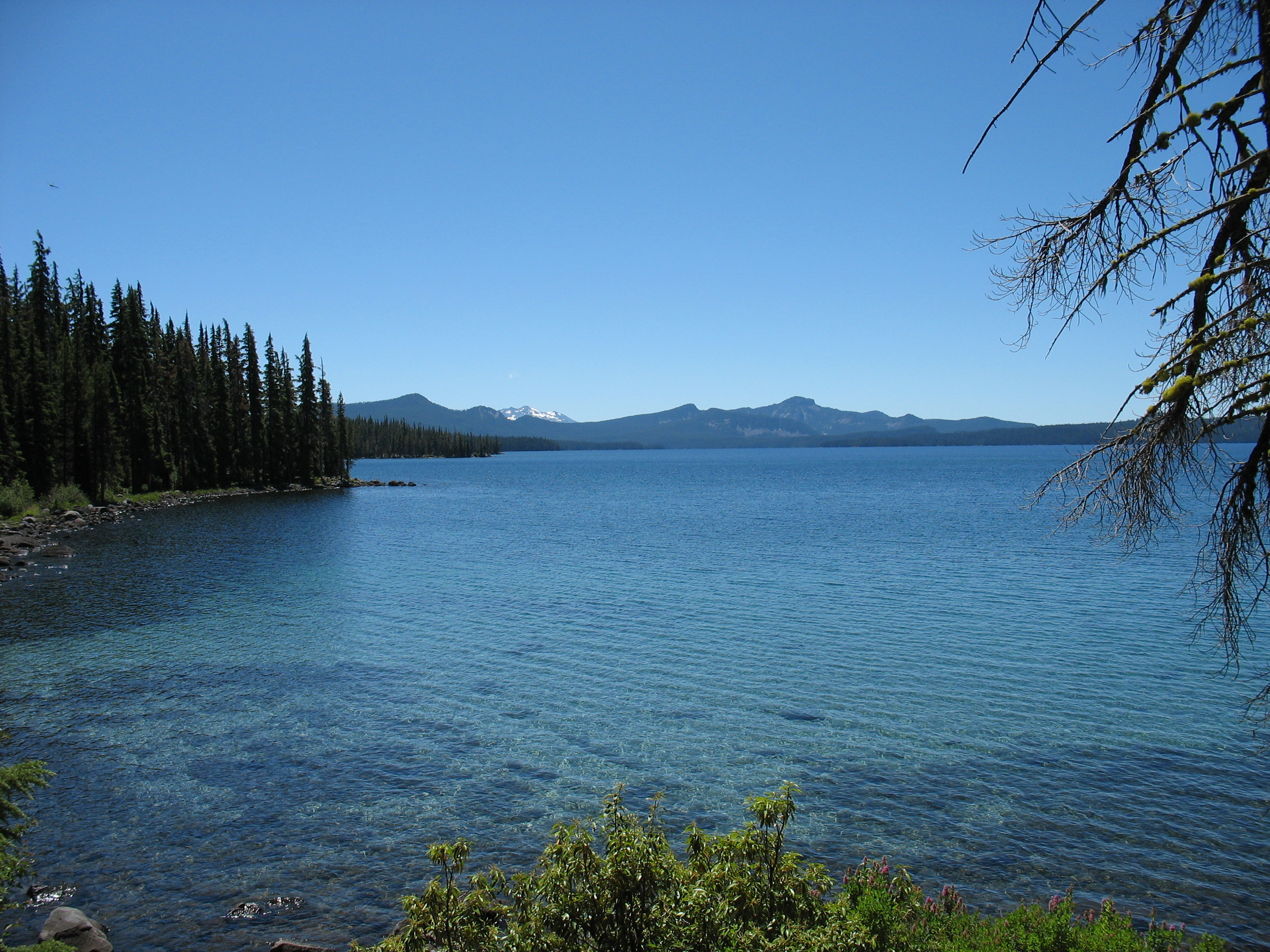
Waldo Lake in the Lane County Cascades

== See also ==
- List of dams and reservoirs in Oregon
- Lists of Oregon-related topics
- List of rivers of Oregon
