= Oak Grove Hydroelectric Project =

Coordinates: 45.1226°N 122.0699°W

The Oak Grove Hydroelectric Project is a 44 megawatt hydroelectric plant operated by Portland General Electric (PGE) on the Oak Grove Fork Clackamas River. Water for this project is held by three lakes, built between 1923 and 1956. The dam creates the impoundment Lake Harriet.

== History ==
In 1907, the Southern Pacific Company began to acquire water rights for the Oak Grove fork. These rights were transferred in 1911 to the Portland Railway, Light and Power Company, which later became PGE.

In 1923, the concrete diversion dam at Lake Harriet was completed. This lake holds 300 acre-feet (370,000 m^{3}) with a surface area of 150 acres (0.61 km^{2}). A 9-foot (2.7 m) pipeline goes downstream from Lake Harriet to the powerhouse. Power generation from the Oak Grove fork began in August 1924.

In 1953, Frog Lake was completed, adding 430 acre-feet (530,000 m^{3}) of storage with 13 acres (53,000 m^{2}) of surface, which was later reduced to 266 acre-feet (328,000 m^{3}) on 6 acres (24,000 m^{2}) in 1997. Finally, in 1956, the compacted-earth dam for Timothy Lake was completed, creating the largest lake in the system at 1,430 acres (5.8 km^{2}) and 69,000 acre-feet (85,000,000 m^{3}). The Oak Grove Powerhouse contains two Francis turbines.
