= Three Creeks =

Three Creeks may refer to:

- Three Creeks, Missouri, a village in Warren County
- Three Creeks, Alberta, a community in Canada
- Three Creeks Trail, a trail in California
- Three Creek Lake, a lake in Oregon
- Three Creeks Township in Boone County, Missouri
- Three Creeks Conservation Area in Boone County, Missouri
