= Magone =

Magone is a surname. Notable people with the surname include:

- Daniel Magone (1827–1904), American lawyer
- Joseph M. Magone (1923–2022), American politician
- Michele Magone (1845–1859), Italian adolescent student of Saint John Bosco

== See also ==
- Magone Lake, a body of water in the Malheur National Forest, Oregon, United States
