= Lake Harriet =

Lake Harriet may refer to:

- Lake Harriet (Minnesota)
- Lake Harriet (Oregon)
