= Island Lake (Oregon) =

Lake in Oregon, United States

- Location within Oregon Location within the United States
- Location: Klamath County, Oregon
- Coordinates: 42°31′05″N 122°14′17″W
- Lake type: Natural, oligotrophic
- Catchment area: 1.3 square miles (3.4 km^{2})
- Basin countries: United States
- Surface area: 41 acres (17 ha)
- Average depth: 5 feet (1.5 m)
- Max. depth: 21 feet (6.4 m)
- Water volume: 200 acre-feet (250,000 m^{3})
- Shore length^{1}: 2 miles (3.2 km)
- Surface elevation: 5,919 feet (1,804 m)
- Islands: One, unnamed
- Settlements: Klamath Falls
- ^{1} Shore length is not a well-defined measure.

Island Lake is one of many small alpine lakes in the southern Cascade Range in the U.S. state of Oregon. Part of the Rogue River watershed, it is 29 miles (47 km) northwest of Klamath Falls at an elevation of about 6,000 feet (1,800 m) above sea level. It is one of the largest of the more than 200 bodies of water in the Sky Lakes Wilderness, which straddles the crest of the Cascades.

Named for the small island in its center, Island Lake is in Klamath County and the Rogue River – Siskiyou National Forest. Red Lake Trail runs along the eastern shore of the lake and meets the Pacific Crest Trail a fraction of a mile to the southeast.

Island Lake supports a population of brook trout ranging in size to a maximum of 18 inches (46 cm). The lake is restocked periodically and supports natural reproduction.

== See also ==
- List of lakes in Oregon
