= Perkins Lake (Oregon) =

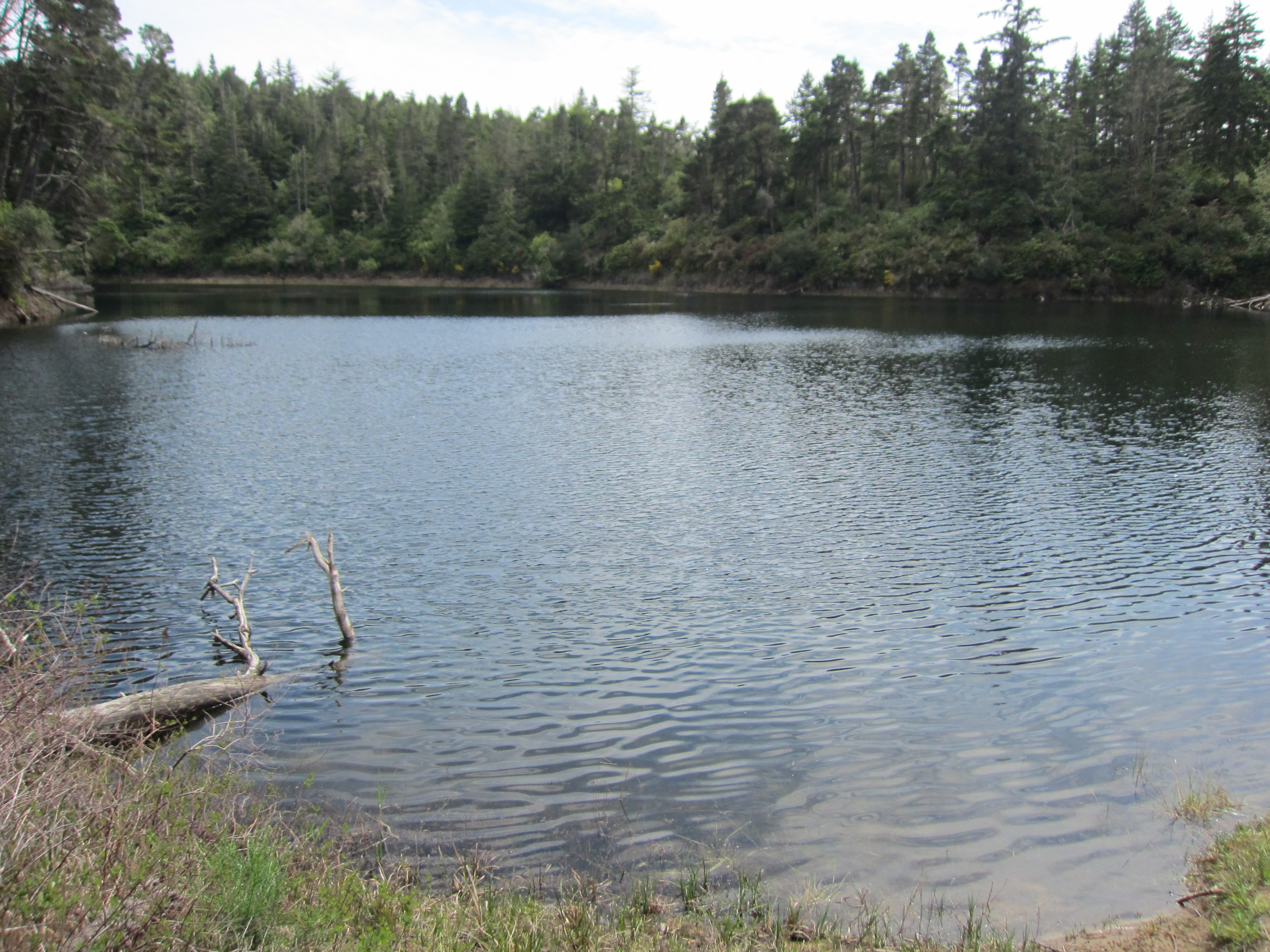
- Perkins Lake (Western side)

- Location within Oregon Location within the United States
- Location: Douglas County
- Coordinates: 43°49′34″N 124°08′58″W
- Type: lake
- Basin countries: United States
- Surface area: 5 to 6 acres (2.0 to 2.4 ha)
- Surface elevation: 125 ft (38 m)

Perkins Lake is a lake on the central Oregon Coast that is located in the Oregon dunes along Highway 101, in Douglas County. It is approximately 5 to 6 acres (2.0 to 2.4 ha) in size and it is stocked with rainbow trout by the Oregon Department of Fish and Wildlife.

== Gallery ==
Eastern side of the lake, near Highway 101

Informational sign near lake

== See also ==
- List of lakes in Oregon
