= Lofton Reservoir =

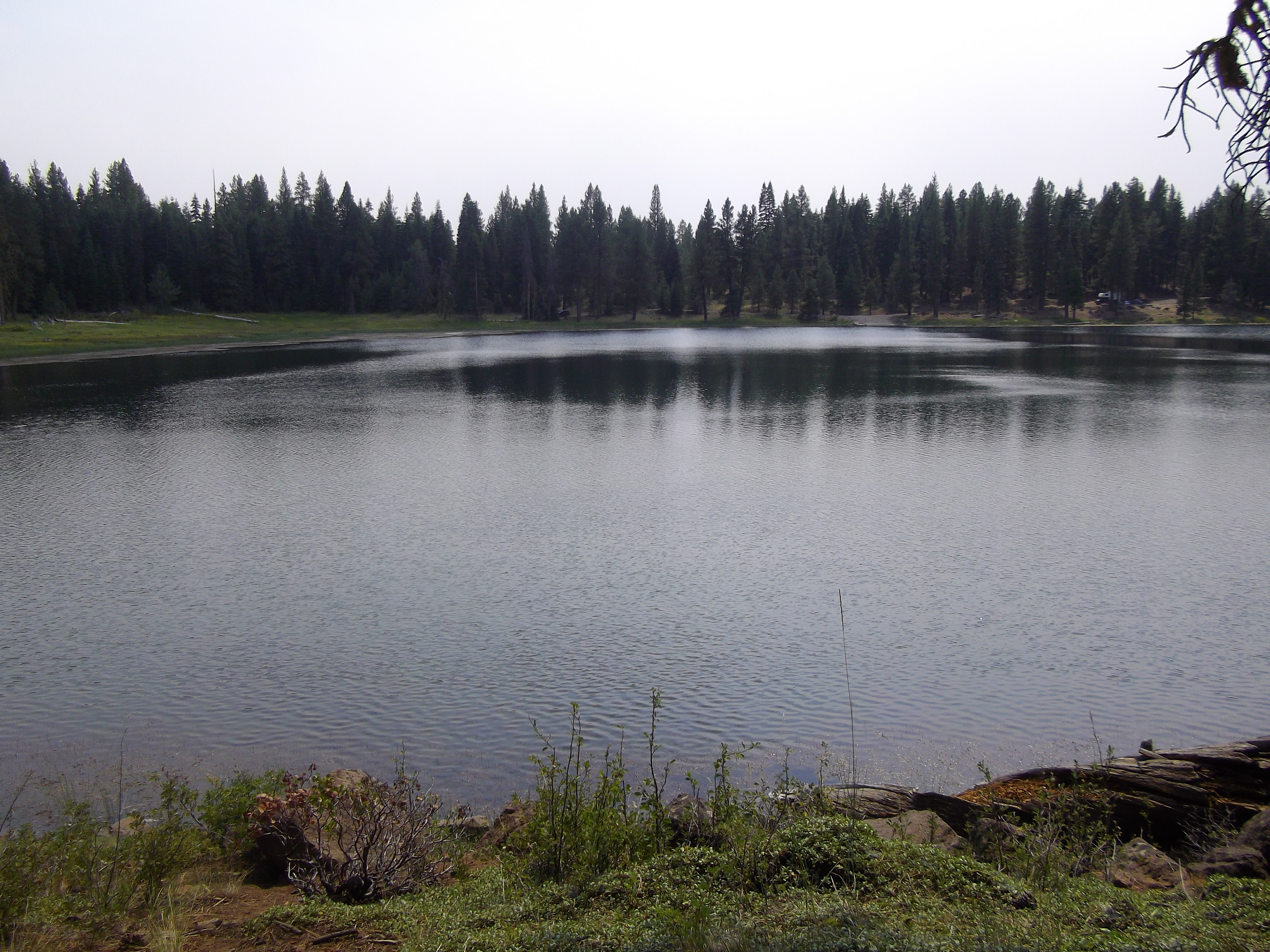
- Main body of Lofton Reservoir

- Location within Oregon Location within the United States
- Location: Lake County, Oregon
- Coordinates: 42°15′54″N 120°49′11″W
- Type: Reservoir
- Primary inflows: Fishhole creek watershed
- Catchment area: 2 sq mi (5.2 km^{2})
- Basin countries: United States
- Surface area: 33 acres (13 ha)
- Average depth: 18 ft (5.5 m)
- Max. depth: 31 ft (9.4 m)
- Water volume: 650 acre-feet (800,000 m^{3}) max
- Surface elevation: 6,152 ft (1,875 m)

Lofton Reservoir, also known locally as None, is an earthen impoundment of water located 6,100 feet (1,900 m) above sea level in Lake County, Oregon, United States. It is 20 miles (32 km) southeast of Bly, used primarily for irrigation & recreation purposes. Construction was completed in 1962. It is owned by Oregon Department of Fish and Wildlife.

== Statistics ==
Lofton reservoir has a normal surface area of 33 acres (13 ha), an average volume of 550 acre-feet (680,000 m^{3}) and a max volume of 650 acre-feet (800,000 m^{3}), and a 2-square-mile (5.2 km^{2}) drainage basin. It has an average depth of 18 feet (5.5 m), and a maximum depth of 31 feet (9.4 m). The Lofton Reservoir stands 32 feet (9.8 m) tall and 265 feet (81 m) long.

== Fauna ==
Rainbow trout and brook trout are common in the lake.

== Recreation ==
Lofton Reservoir has a pack it in-pack it out campground located around the lake. Popular activities include fishing and boating limited to electric motors.

== See also ==
- List of lakes in Oregon
