= Mud Lake (Oregon) =

There are at least sixteen lakes named Mud Lake within the U.S. state of Oregon. Some have an alternate name of Mud Lake, but are listed here by their primary name.

name	type	elevation	coordinate	USGS Map	GNIS ID
Bear Lake (Hood River County, Oregon)	Lake	3,904 ft (1,190 m)	45°38′59″N 121°44′02″W	Mount Defiance	1137723
Hosmer Lake (Deschutes County, Oregon)	Lake	4,997 ft (1,523 m)	43°58′09″N 121°46′19″W	Elk Lake	1158295
Little Walls Lake (Harney County, Oregon)	Lake	4,757 ft (1,450 m)	42°50′13″N 119°05′15″W	Walls Lake	1123308
Mud Lake (Malheur County, Oregon)	Flat	4,321 ft (1,317 m)	43°05′09″N 117°29′40″W	Jordan Craters South	1124458
Mud Lake (Lake County, Oregon)	Lake	6,217 ft (1,895 m)	42°15′46″N 120°47′21″W	Quartz Valley	1124459
Mud Lake (Malheur County, Oregon)	Lake	4,071 ft (1,241 m)	43°12′52″N 117°51′05″W	Sacramento Butte	1124461
Mud Lake (Union County, Oregon)	Lake	7,103 ft (2,165 m)	44°57′59″N 118°13′56″W	Anthony Lakes	1124462
Mud Lake (Baker County, Oregon)	Lake	7,070 ft (2,150 m)	45°03′29″N 117°06′53″W	Deadman Point	1124463
Mud Lake (Harney County, Oregon)	Lake	4,101 ft (1,250 m)	43°16′06″N 118°59′26″W	The Narrows	1124464
Mud Lake (Lake County, Oregon)	Reservoir	5,381 ft (1,640 m)	42°12′42″N 119°42′58″W	Mud Lake Reservoir	1133618
Mud Lake (Grant County, Oregon)	Lake	4,183 ft (1,275 m)	44°46′17″N 118°48′12″W	Sharp Ridge	1133789
Mud Lake (Lane County, Oregon)	Lake	4,908 ft (1,496 m)	43°49′16″N 122°02′14″W	Waldo Mountain	1146569
Mud Lake (Grant County, Oregon)	Lake	7,313 ft (2,229 m)	44°16′34″N 118°39′36″W	Strawberry Mountain	1146570
Mud Lake (Klamath County, Oregon)	Lake	5,620 ft (1,710 m)	42°31′11″N 122°16′30″W	Rustler Peak	1146571
Mud Lake (Coos County, Oregon)	Lake	3,825 ft (1,166 m)	42°42′26″N 124°07′34″W	Ophir Mountain	1146572
Mud Lake (Douglas County, Oregon)	Lake	4,734 ft (1,443 m)	43°11′13″N 122°30′13″W	Twin Lakes Mountain	1146573
Mud Lake (Lane County, Oregon)	Lake	4,836 ft (1,474 m)	43°56′16″N 121°55′35″W	Packsaddle Mountain	1146574
Mud Lake (Grant County, Oregon)	Lake	3,924 ft (1,196 m)	44°18′04″N 118°57′13″W	Canyon Mountain	1146575
Mud Lake (Hood River County, Oregon)	Lake	3,668 ft (1,118 m)	45°35′55″N 121°47′21″W	Wahtum Lake	1146576
Mud Lake (Baker County, Oregon)	Reservoir	4,311 ft (1,314 m)	44°58′24″N 117°11′18″W	Jimtown	1146579
Mud Lake (Deschutes County, Oregon)	Flat	4,882 ft (1,488 m)	43°38′21″N 120°25′04″W	Imperial Valley South	1161084
Mud Lake (Lake County, Oregon)	Flat	5,367 ft (1,636 m)	42°11′59″N 119°43′10″W	Mud Lake Reservoir	1161448
Mud Lake (Columbia County, Oregon)	Lake	10 ft (3.0 m)	45°44′19″N 122°49′19″W	Sauvie Island	1166975
Toad Lake (Douglas County, Oregon)	Lake	4,908 ft (1,496 m)	43°02′19″N 122°28′59″W	Fish Mountain	1162599

== See also ==
- List of lakes in Oregon
