= Delintment Lake =

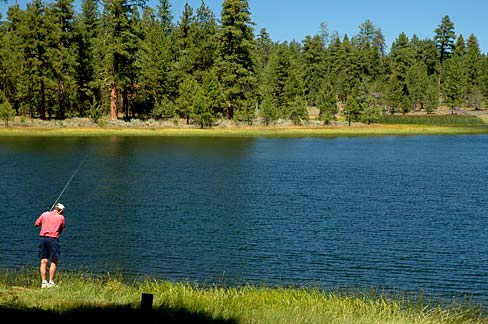
- Fishing at Delintment Lake

- Location of Delintment Lake in Oregon Delintment Lake (the United States)
- Location: Harney County, Oregon, United States
- Coordinates: 43°53′37″N 119°37′46″W
- Type: Eutrophic reservoir
- Etymology: Named after F. S. De Lentiement, a 19th-century homesteader
- Primary inflows: Delintment Creek
- Primary outflows: Delintment Creek
- Catchment area: 1.2 square miles (3.1 km^{2})
- Basin countries: United States
- Managing agency: United States Forest Service
- Surface area: 62 acres (25 ha)
- Average depth: 8 feet (2.4 m)
- Max. depth: 18 feet (5.5 m)
- Water volume: 485 acre-feet (598,000 m^{3})
- Shore length^{1}: 1.6 miles (2.6 km)
- Surface elevation: 5,562 feet (1,695 m)
- ^{1} Shore length is not a well-defined measure.

Delintment Lake is an artificial lake about 33 miles (53 km) northwest of Burns in the U.S. state of Oregon. Its name derives from that of homesteader F. S. De Lentiement, who in 1891 was granted ownership of a 160-acre (65 ha) tract that included the land where the lake now stands.

The lake originated as a series of beaver ponds along Delintment Creek, a tributary of Silver Creek in Harney County. In 1940, the United States Forest Service combined and enlarged the ponds, and in 1953 local interest groups made further changes to improve conditions for fishing and other recreation. The dam that impounds the lake is 270 feet (82 m) long and 20 feet (6.1 m) high.

A Malheur National Forest campground with 29 campsites is adjacent to the lake. Activities include fishing, swimming, picnicking, and boating. Campground hosts are present during the summer.

== See also ==
- List of lakes in Oregon
