= Buckeye Lake (Oregon) =

Lake in Oregon, United States

- Location of Buckeye Lake in Oregon Buckeye Lake (the United States)
- Location: Douglas County, Oregon, United States
- Coordinates: 43°03′47″N 122°31′19″W
- Basin countries: United States
- Surface area: 10.8 acres (4.4 ha)
- Shore length^{1}: 0.6 miles (1 km)
- Surface elevation: 4,193 feet (1,278 m)
- ^{1} Shore length is not a well-defined measure.

Buckeye Lake is a high-elevation lake in the Rogue–Umpqua Divide Wilderness in southern Oregon in the United States. It is about 35 miles (56 km) east of Tiller in Douglas County.

The lake, which covers about 11 acres (4.5 ha), supports a population of brook trout up to 18 inches (460 mm) long. The lake is reachable by forest trail. Ice fishing here is possible in February and March for hikers willing to approach the lake by snowshoe.

== See also ==
- List of lakes in Oregon
