= Timothy Lake =

Lake in Oregon, United States

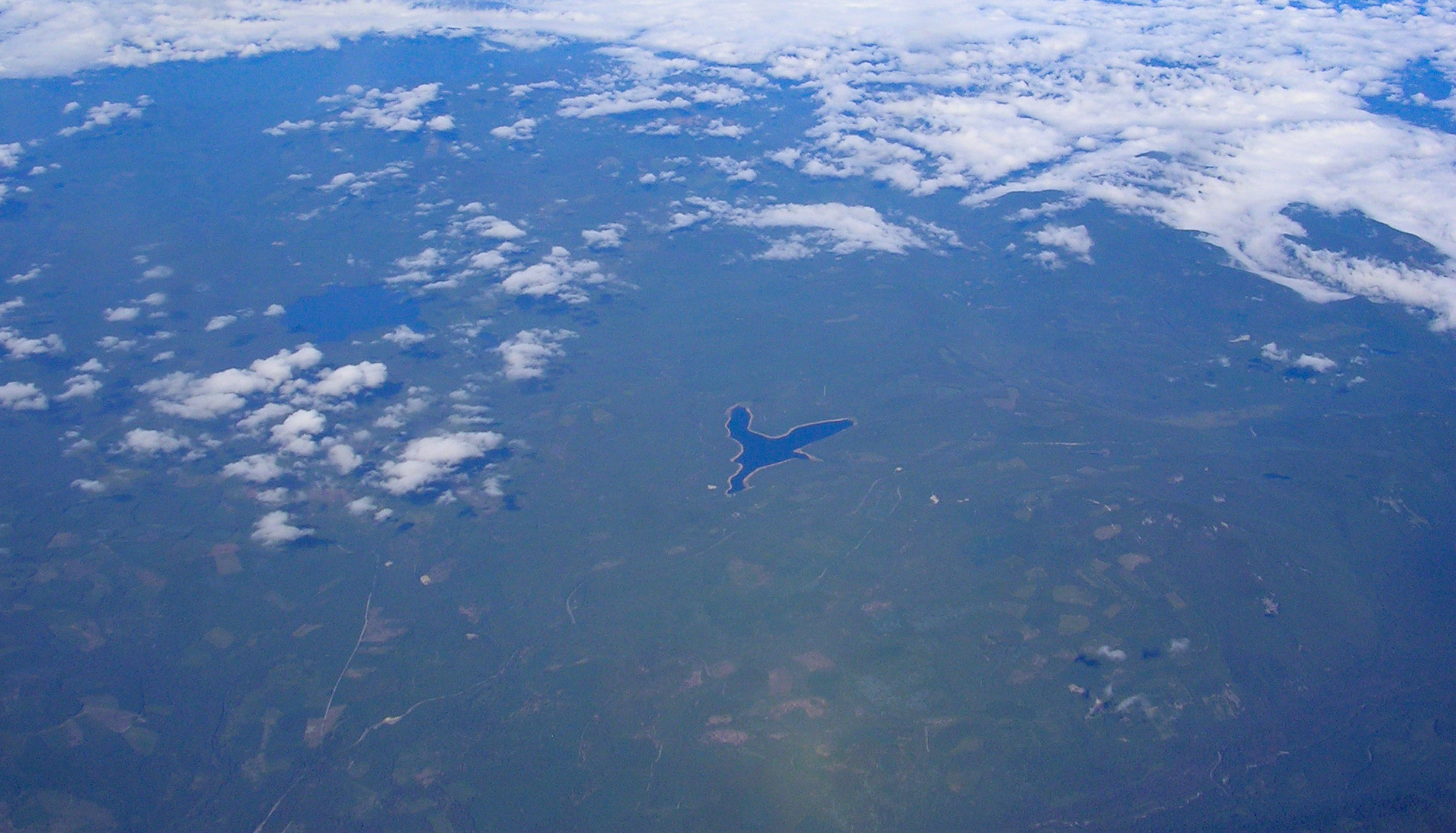
- Clear Lake and Timothy Lake

- Location within Oregon Location within the United States
- Location: Clackamas County, Oregon, United States
- Coordinates: 45.121022°N 121.785654°W
- Basin countries: United States
- Surface area: 2.17 square miles (5.6 km^{2})
- Average depth: 45 feet (14 m)
- Max. depth: 80 feet (24 m)
- Surface elevation: 3,227 feet (984 m)

Timothy Lake is a lake about 50 miles (80 km) southeast of Portland, Oregon, United States. It is in proximity to Clear Lake and an impoundment of the Oak Grove Fork Clackamas River.

The compacted-earth Timothy Lake Dam was built by Portland General Electric in 1956 to regulate seasonal water flow to Lake Harriet downstream. The dam, 110 feet high and impounding 81,000 acre-feet, does not generate any hydroelectric power itself. In the summer, the lake is a very popular destination for camping, boating, hiking, horseback riding, and mountain biking.

== See also ==
- List of lakes in Oregon
