= Summit Lake (Oregon) =

There are 7 lakes named Summit Lake in the U.S. state of Oregon:

name	elevation	coordinate	USGS Map	GNIS ID
Summit Lake (Clackamas County, Oregon)	4,183 ft (1,275 m)	45°01′53″N 121°47′17″W	Timothy Lake	1150623
Summit Lake (Jackson County, Oregon)	4,744 ft (1,446 m)	42°00′52″N 123°01′09″W	Squaw Lakes	1150620
Summit Lake (Klamath County, Oregon)	5,558 ft (1,694 m)	43°27′23″N 122°07′20″W	Cowhorn Mountain	1150624
Summit Lake (Jackson County, Oregon)	5,755 ft (1,754 m)	42°28′30″N 122°17′09″W	Mount McLoughlin	1150621
Summit Lake (Jefferson County, Oregon)	5,909 ft (1,801 m)	44°27′45″N 121°50′39″W	Three Fingered Jack	1150622
Little Summit Lake	6,952 ft (2,119 m)	44°52′41″N 118°12′16″W	Anthony Lakes	1123294
Summit Lake (Baker County, Oregon)	7,251 ft (2,210 m)	44°52′31″N 118°11′46″W	Anthony Lakes	1127716

== See also ==
- List of lakes in Oregon
