= Camp Lake (Oregon) =

Lake in Oregon

- Location of Camp Lake in Oregon Camp Lake (the United States)
- Location: Deschutes County, Oregon, United States
- Coordinates: 44°07′55″N 121°45′38″W
- Basin countries: United States
- Surface area: 6.4 acres (2.6 ha)
- Shore length^{1}: 0.4 miles (0.64 km)
- Surface elevation: 6,968 feet (2,124 m)
- ^{1} Shore length is not a well-defined measure.

Camp Lake is a small alpine lake in Deschutes County in the U.S. state of Oregon. It lies between the Middle Sister and South Sister volcanic peaks at about 7,000 feet (2,100 m) above sea level in the Three Sisters Wilderness of the Cascade Range. The Camp Lake Trail skirts the lake along its north shore.

Camp Lake has a surface area of 6.4 acres (2.6 ha) and a shoreline of about 0.4 miles (0.6 km). The lake forms the headwaters of the south fork of Whychus Creek, a tributary of the Deschutes River.

== See also ==
- List of lakes in Oregon
