= Mann Lake =

Lake in Harney County, Oregon, United States

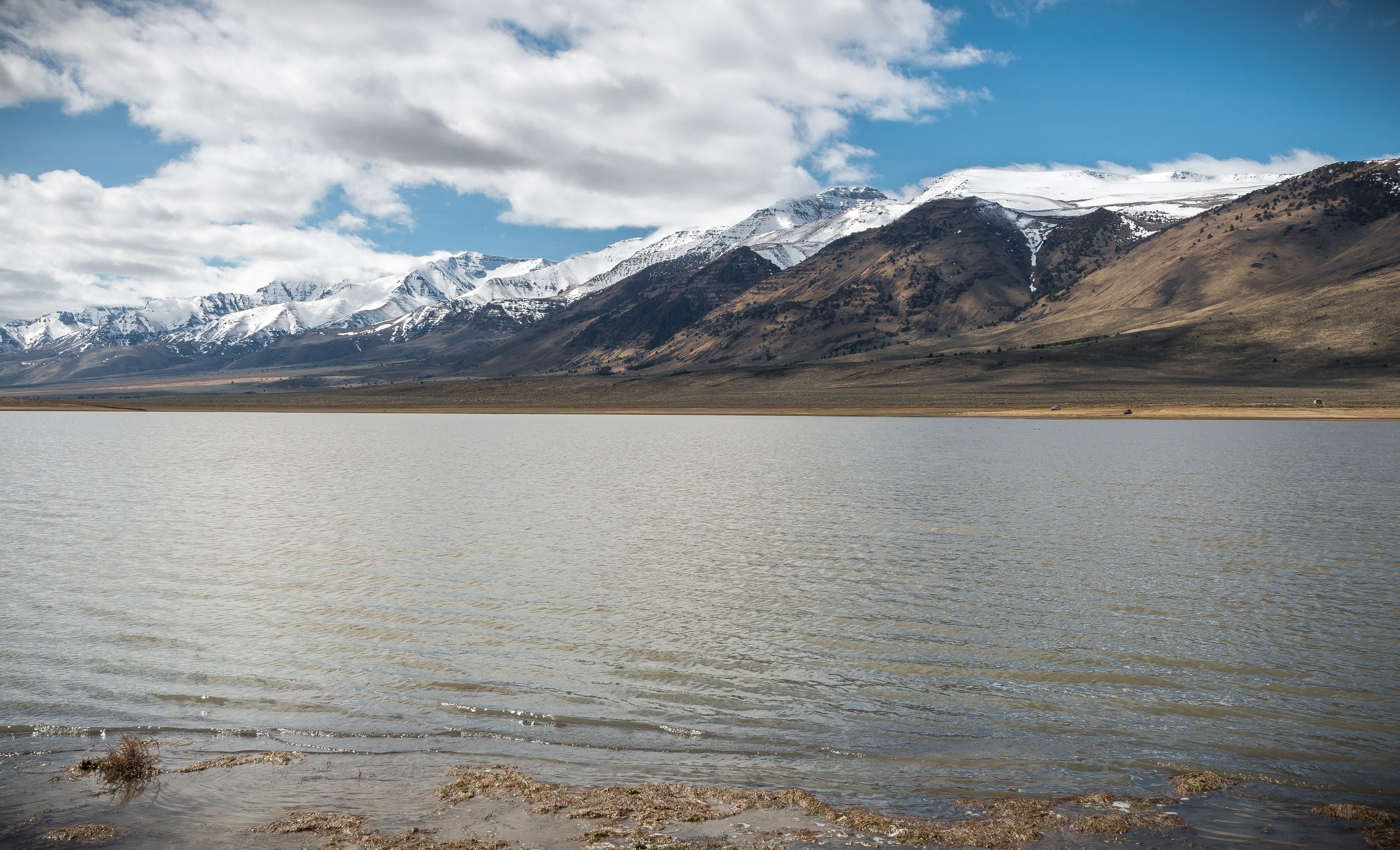
- Mann Lake and Steens Mountain

- Location within Oregon Location within the United States
- Location: Harney County, Oregon
- Coordinates: 42°46′20″N 118°26′49″W
- Type: Natural, hypereutrophic
- Primary inflows: Intermittent streams
- Primary outflows: Evaporation
- Catchment area: 41 square miles (110 km^{2})
- Basin countries: United States
- Surface area: 276 acres (112 ha)
- Average depth: 6 feet (1.8 m)
- Max. depth: 14 feet (4.3 m)
- Water volume: 1,600 acre-feet (2,000,000 m^{3})
- Shore length^{1}: 2.4 miles (3.9 km)
- Surface elevation: 4,173 feet (1,272 m)
- Settlements: Burns; Fields
- ^{1} Shore length is not a well-defined measure.

Mann Lake is the largest of the shallow playa lakes in the northern part of the Alvord Valley in Harney County in the U.S. state of Oregon. The lake is a remnant of a larger Pleistocene lake that covered much of the valley, east of Steens Mountain. Fields–Denio Road runs along the east side of the lake.

Inflow to Mann Lake comes from small, intermittent streams, mainly from Steens Mountain. The lake, which has no outlet, but loses water by evaporation, is hypereutrophic. An influx of cattle waste from nearby rangelands adds to the lake's natural eutrophic state. Large concentrations of Cladophora algae are common.

The Bureau of Land Management operates the Mann Lake Recreation Site, about 100 miles (160 km) southeast of Burns by highway and unpaved road. The site has vault restrooms and boat ramps, but no other amenities. Recreation at or near the site includes fishing, camping, hiking, wildlife viewing, and amateur geology.

Mann Lake, stocked with Lahontan cutthroat trout, has been called "one of the premiere trout fisheries in southeast Oregon". Trout in the lake range in length from 12 to 20 inches (30 to 51 cm). Fishing is restricted to artificial flies and lures.

A large population of goldfish, introduced illegally, have at times multiplied in Mann Lake and competed for food with the smaller trout. In 2010, the Oregon Department of Fish and Wildlife treated the lake with rotenone, a piscicide, killing around 200,000 goldfish and fathead minnows while sparing nearly all the trout.

== See also ==
- List of lakes in Oregon
