= Walling Pond =

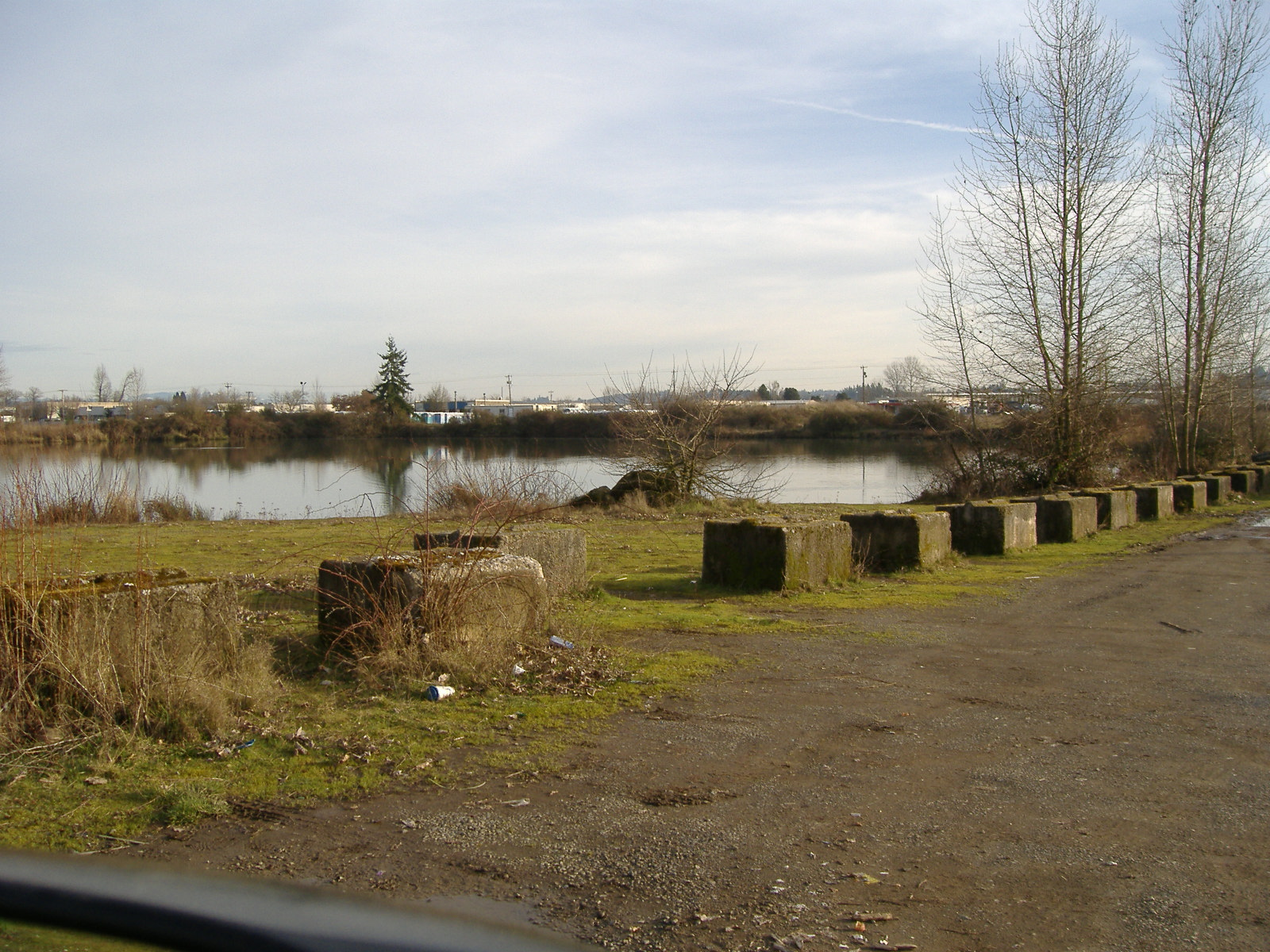

- Location within Oregon Location within the United States
- Location: Salem, Oregon
- Coordinates: 44°55.08′N 123°1.35′W
- Type: Quarry Lake
- Primary inflows: Pringle Creek
- Primary outflows: Pringle Creek
- Basin countries: United States

Walling Pond is a privately owned pond that is open to the public for fishing. The pond, located in Salem, Oregon, is owned by the Walling family. The pond is located at the original site of their sand and gravel processing plant at the northeast corner of McGilchrist and 16th Streets, S.E. The pond is popular with bait anglers and produces stocked rainbow trout.

== See also ==
- List of lakes in Oregon
