= Morgan Lake (Oregon) =

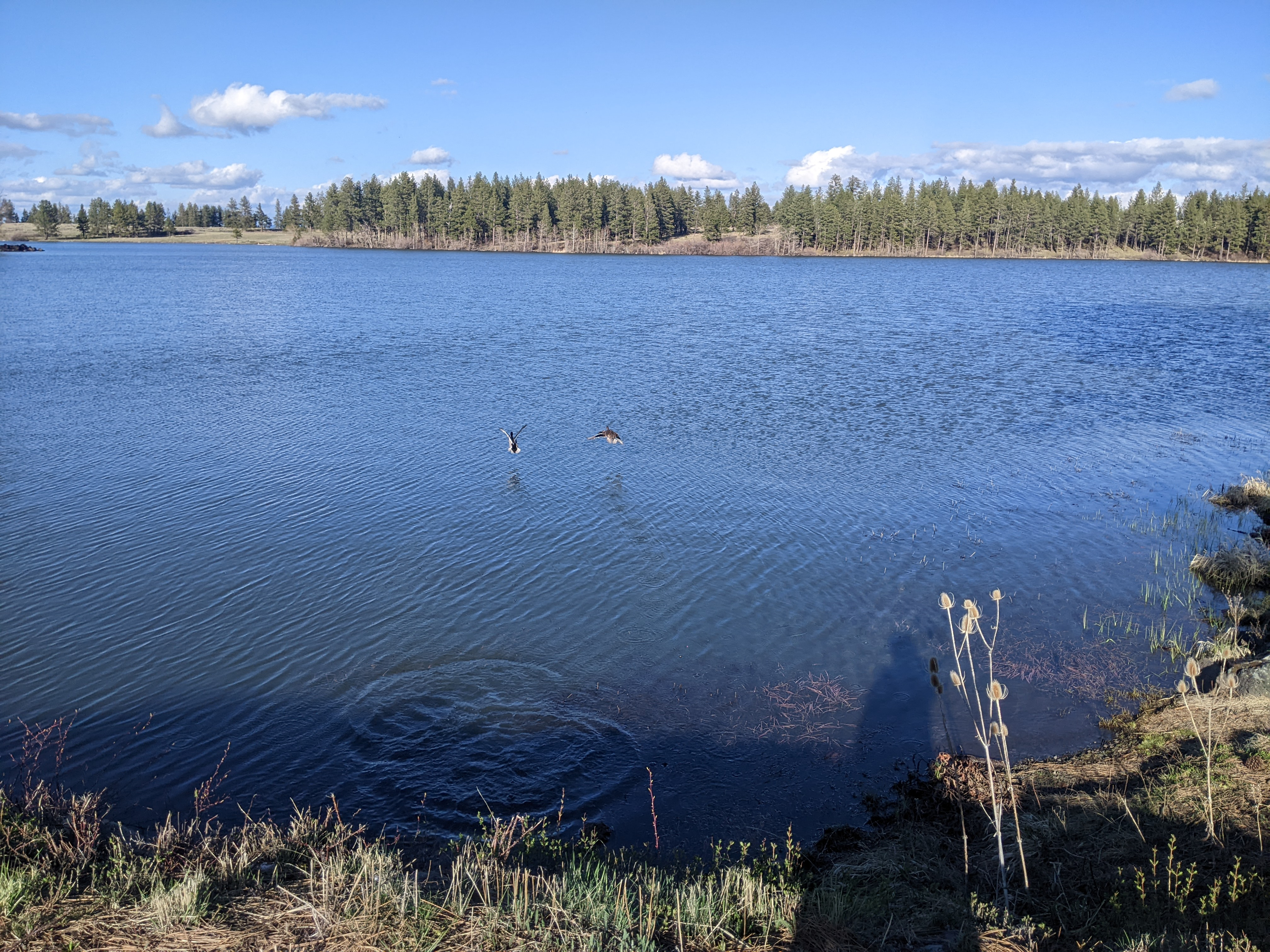
- Morgan Lake

- Location within Oregon Location within the United States
- Location: Union County, Oregon, United States
- Coordinates: 45°18′5″N 118°8′10″W
- Type: Reservoir
- Primary inflows: none
- Primary outflows: none
- Managing agency: U.S. Forest Service
- Surface area: 45 acres (18 ha)
- Average depth: 23 ft (7.0 m)
- Shore length^{1}: 2.6 mi (4.2 km)
- Surface elevation: 4,157 ft (1,267 m)
- ^{1} Shore length is not a well-defined measure.

Morgan Lake is a 45-acre (18 ha) lake in the Umatilla National Forest in the heart of Union County in the U.S. state of Oregon. It is located 4.9 miles (7.9 km) west of La Grande, at an elevation of 4,157 feet (1,267 m). In 1976 an earthen dam was constructed on the preexisting lake, 180 feet (55 m) long and 20 feet (6.1 m) high, for irrigation and electrical purposes. A U.S. Forest Service campground at the lake has 17 sites. Fishing and swimming are the most popular activities at the lake.

== See also ==
- List of lakes in Oregon
