= Deep Lake (Oregon) =

Deep Lake may refer to any of the several lakes in the U.S. state of Oregon:

There are 5 bodies of water listed as of October 18, 2013.

name	type	elevation	coordinate	USGS Map	GNIS url
Crater Lake	Lake	6,174 ft (1,882 m)	42.9419°N 122.1064°W	Crater Lake East	
Deep Canyon Lake (Harney County, Oregon)	Lake	4,895 ft (1,492 m)	43.1222°N 119.4078°W	Flybee Lake	
Deep Lake (Harney County, Oregon)	Lake	5,039 ft (1,536 m)	43.0444°N 119.3211°W	Meadow Lake	
Deep Lake (Marion County, Oregon)	Lake	98 ft (30 m)	45.0775°N 123.0125°W	Mission Bottom	
Deep Lake (Heavenly, Klamath County, Oregon)	Lake	5,984 ft (1,824 m)	42.5736°N 122.1942°W	Pelican Butte	
Deep Lake (White Pine, Klamath County, Oregon)	Lake	5,955 ft (1,815 m)	42.6058°N 122.1983°W	Pelican Butte	
Deep Lake (Columbia County, Oregon)	Lake	10 ft (3.0 m)	45.8381°N 122.7975°W	Saint Helens	

== See also ==
- List of lakes in Oregon
