= Aspen Lake =

Lake in Oregon, United States

- Location within Oregon Location within the United States
- Location: Klamath Falls, Oregon, United States
- Coordinates: 42.2840°N 122.0081°W
- Basin countries: United States

Aspen Lake is a swampy lake in the Southern Cascade Range, just west of Klamath Falls, Oregon, United States. It is about 5.5 by 3 miles (8.9 by 4.8 km) (2,500 acres (10 km^{2})) in area and located at 4,314 ft (1,315 m) in altitude off Aspen Rd, 56.8 mi (91 km) from the junction of Oregon Route 140 with Oregon Route 62 at White City, Oregon.

Trout is the primary species for fishing in Aspen Lake. According to the Oregon Department of Fish and Wildlife it also offers fishing for brown bullhead.

Aspen Lake is also a good spot for bird-watching, reportedly one of the areas where the rare yellow rail has nested.

== In popular culture ==
- In the GameCube games Wave Race: Blue Storm and 1080° Avalanche, Aspen Lake is a playable level.

== See also ==
- Aspen Butte
- List of lakes in Oregon
