= Lost Lake (Oregon) =

Oregon has at least 19 lakes named Lost Lake:

Article name	elev. (ft)	location	USGS map	GNIS ID
Lost Lake (Baker County, Oregon)	7388	44.903473°N 118.22633°W	Anthony Lakes	1123509
Lost Lake Reservoir (Baker County, Oregon)	6152	45.116547°N 117.048218°W	Deadman Point	1129538
Lost Lake (Nicolai Mountain, Clatsop County, Oregon)	512	46.121777°N 123.39596°W	Nicolai Mountain	1123503
Lost Lake (Elsie, Clatsop County, Oregon)	1476	45.824°N 123.579014°W	Elsie	1123511
Lost Lake (Camas Valley, Coos County, Oregon)	2356	43.107614°N 123.705362°W	Camas Valley	1160899
Lost Lake (Bandon, Coos County, Oregon)	26	43.025664°N 124.43178°W	Bandon	1161428
Lost Lake (Callahan, Douglas County, Oregon)	1542	43.284281°N 123.607308°W	Callahan	1123506
Lost Lake (Tahkenitch Creek, Douglas County, Oregon)	161	43.832341°N 124.147061°W	Tahkenitch Creek	1153410
Lost Lake (Grant County, Oregon)	6155	44.802929°N 118.646066°W	Desolation Butte	1145545
Lost Lake (Harney County, Oregon)	7444	42.720442°N 118.653525°W	Fish Lake	1123505
Lost Lake (Hood River County, Oregon)	3146	45.489840°N 121.822578°W	Bull Run Lake	1145546
Lost Lake (Jackson County, Oregon)	3599	42.315133°N 122.558363°W	Grizzly Peak	1123504
Lost Lake (Jefferson County, Oregon)	5305	44.773174°N 121.758124°W	Olallie Butte	1145544
Lost Lake (Pelican Butte, Klamath County, Oregon)	5873	42.514022°N 122.211690°W	Pelican Butte	1145543
Lost Lake (Antler Point, Klamath County, Oregon)	5584	42.095713°N 120.901085°W	Antler Point	1153866
Lost Lake (Tidbits Mountain, Linn County, Oregon)	3730	44.355681°N 122.251462°W	Tidbits Mountain	1123507
Lost Lake (Santiam Pass, Linn County, Oregon)	4003	44.43262°N 121.909506°W	Santiam Junction	1123508
Lost Lake (Morrow County, Oregon)	600	45.756522°N 119.434465°W	Ordnance	1123510
Lost Lake (Wallowa County, Oregon)	6427	45.222101°N 117.099608°W	Lick Creek	1153062

== See also ==
- List of lakes in Oregon
