= Thorn Lake (Lake County, Oregon) =

Lake

- Location of Thorn Lake in Oregon Thorn Lake (the United States)
- Location: Lake County, Oregon, United States
- Coordinates: 43°08′45″N 120°50′38″W
- Basin countries: United States
- Surface area: 319.7 acres (129.4 ha)
- Shore length^{1}: 4.2 miles (6.8 km)
- Surface elevation: 4,301 feet (1,311 m)
- ^{1} Shore length is not a well-defined measure.

Thorn Lake is a dry high-desert lake in Lake County in the U.S. state of Oregon. The Atlas of Oregon Lakes lists its surface area at about 320 acres (130 ha) and its shoreline at about 4 miles (6.4 km) but provides no other details.

Thorn Lake has been dry for many years, Doctor E. D Cope, a scientist traveling through the area in 1889, noted that Thorn Lake was a dry playa at that time. A 2008 topographic map of Oregon indicates that Thorn Lake is dry.

The lake is about 8 miles (13 km) east of the unincorporated community of Silver Lake and about 2 miles (3.2 km) north of the intermittent lake called Silver Lake near Oregon Route 31.

== See also ==
- List of lakes in Oregon
