= Cooper Creek Reservoir =

Reservoir in Douglas County, Oregon, US

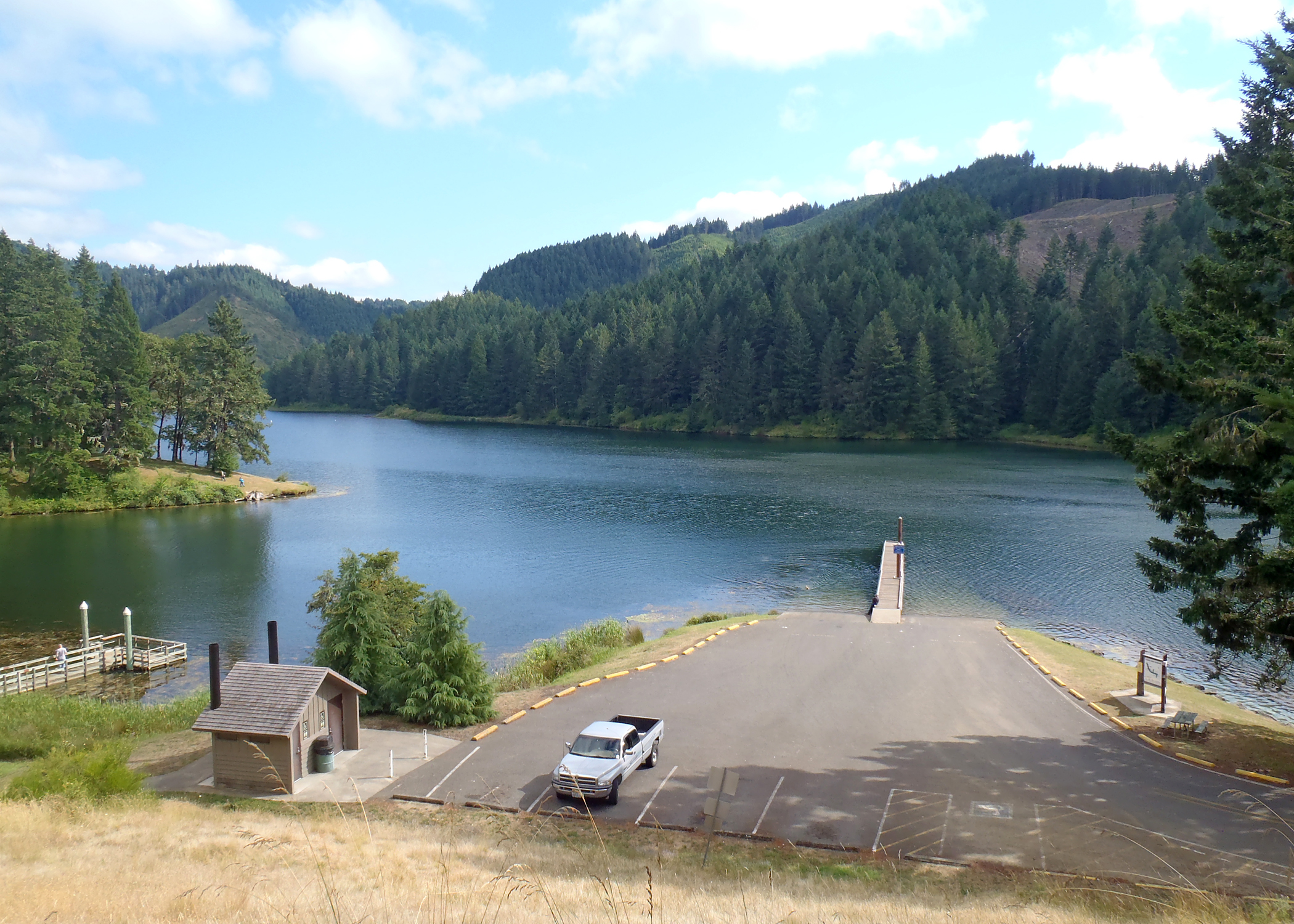
- Cooper Creek Reservoir boat launch and dock

- Location of Cooper Creek Reservoir in Oregon, USA. Cooper Creek Reservoir (the United States)
- Location: Douglas County, Oregon
- Coordinates: 43°22′48″N 123°16′54″W
- Type: Reservoir, eutrophic
- Primary inflows: Cooper Creek
- Primary outflows: Cooper Creek
- Catchment area: 4.5 square miles (12 km^{2})
- Basin countries: United States
- Surface area: 166 acres (67 ha)
- Average depth: 23 feet (7.0 m)
- Max. depth: 70 feet (21 m)
- Water volume: 3,800 acre-feet (4,700,000 m^{3})
- Residence time: 9 months
- Shore length^{1}: 5.1 miles (8.2 km)
- Surface elevation: 673 feet (205 m)
- Settlements: Sutherlin
- ^{1} Shore length is not a well-defined measure.

Cooper Creek Reservoir is a body of water behind an earthen dam across Cooper Creek in the Umpqua River basin of the U.S. state of Oregon. The reservoir is in Douglas County, about 2 miles (3 km) east of Sutherlin and about 11 miles (18 km) north of Roseburg. The impoundment provides part of Sutherlin's drinking water.

The reservoir supports populations of largemouth bass, panfish, and stocked rainbow trout. The panfish and bass grow to large sizes, but mercury pollution from old mine tailings upstream makes eating them risky. On February 12, 2001 Oregon Health Department issued a mercury-related health advisory for fish caught in the reservoir. However, municipal water from the reservoir was deemed safe to drink, and the mercury posed no threat to recreational activities in the lake. Mercury levels in the fish were not expected to diminish in the foreseeable future.

== Recreation ==
Cooper Creek Reservoir Park, managed by Douglas County, has two boat launches, a swimming area, and a dock. It offers opportunities for fishing, waterskiing, and jet skiing. Amenities include a pavilion, a picnic area, and toilets. The park is for day use only, and no camping is allowed. A hiking trail circles the reservoir.

== See also ==
- List of lakes in Oregon
