= Medco Pond =

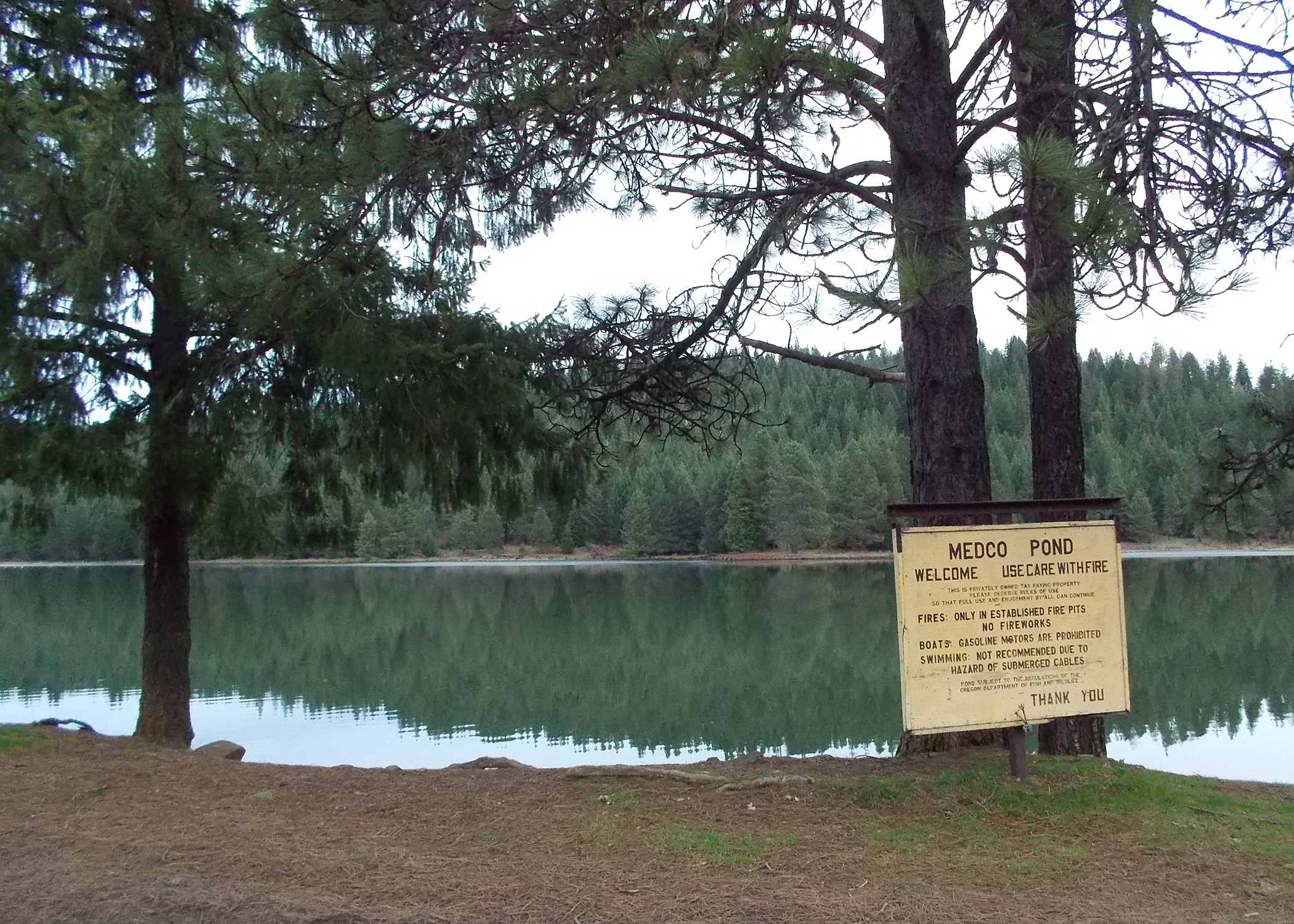

- Location within Oregon Location within the United States
- Location: Jackson County, Oregon
- Coordinates: 42°39′32″N 122°26′09″W
- Type: lake
- Etymology: Medford Corporation
- Basin countries: United States
- Surface elevation: 3,219 ft (981 m)

Medco Pond is a lake in the U.S. state of Oregon.

Medco Pond took its name from Medford Corporation (Medco), a local lumber operation.
