= Magone Lake =

Lake in Oregon, United States

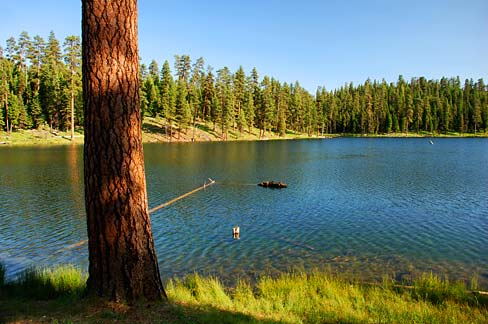

- Location within Oregon Location within the United States
- Location: Grant County, Oregon
- Coordinates: 44°32′56″N 118°54′41″W
- Type: Natural, mesotrophic
- Primary inflows: Lake Creek
- Primary outflows: Lake Creek to East Fork Beech Creek
- Catchment area: 1.2 square miles (3.1 km^{2})
- Basin countries: United States
- Surface area: 30 acres (12 ha)
- Average depth: 29 feet (8.8 m)
- Max. depth: 98 feet (30 m)
- Water volume: 900 acre-feet (1,100,000 m^{3})
- Residence time: 5.8 years
- Shore length^{1}: 1.4 miles (2.3 km)
- Surface elevation: 4,993 feet (1,522 m)
- ^{1} Shore length is not a well-defined measure.

Magone Lake is a 30-acre (12 ha) body of water in the Malheur National Forest of eastern Oregon in the United States. The lake, at nearly 5,000 feet (1,500 m) above sea level, is in Grant County, 10 miles (16 km) north of the small city of John Day. It receives water from Lake Creek, which continues downstream from the lake and flows into East Fork Beech Creek in the John Day River watershed.

Among the few natural lakes in this part of Oregon, Magone Lake is popular for its recreational opportunities, particularly fishing, including ice fishing during the cold months. Rainbow trout and brook trout are abundant.

The United States Forest Service maintains a campground with single-family and group sites at the lake. A separate day-use area has picnic tables, changing rooms for swimmers, and a boat dock. Wildflower viewing, hiking, and mountain biking are other activities available nearby.

== See also ==
- List of lakes in Oregon
