= Three Creek Lake =

Lake in Oregon, United States

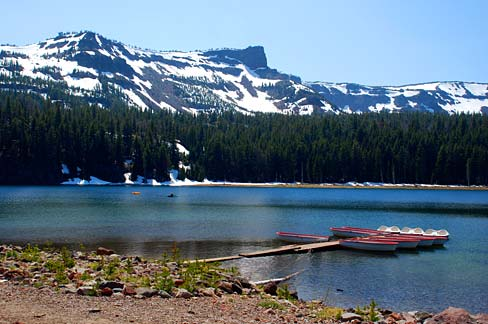

- Location within Oregon Location within the United States
- Location: Deschutes County, Oregon
- Coordinates: 44.099°N 121.627°W
- Basin countries: United States
- Surface area: 0.11875 sq mi (0.3076 km^{2})
- Average depth: 20 ft (6.1 m)
- Max. depth: 28 ft (8.5 m)
- Surface elevation: 6,550 ft (2,000 m)

Three Creek Lake is a lake in Deschutes County, Oregon. It has an area of 76 acres, a depth of 11–28 feet and an elevation of 6550 feet. The picturesque mountain lake is located in a glacial cirque, formed by the Cabot Creek Glaciation 13,000 years ago. Three Creek Lake is overshadowed by Tam McArthur Rim, named after the Oregon Geographic Names Secretary from 1916–1949. Surrounded by old growth forest, fishing and hiking are among the most popular recreational activities.

== See also ==
- List of lakes in Oregon
