= Botens Reservoir =

Reservoir in the U.S. state of Oregon

- Location of Botens Reservoir in Oregon
- Location: Klamath County, Oregon
- Coordinates: 42°10′58.3″N 121°50′29″W
- Type: Reservoir
- Primary inflows: Unnamed dry draw
- Primary outflows: 15 Foot Concrete pipe in dam
- Basin countries: United States
- Built: April 1, 1947
- Surface area: 3.4 acres (1.4 ha)
- Average depth: 4 ft (1.2 m)
- Max. depth: 13.5 ft (4.1 m)
- Water volume: 14 acre⋅ft (17,000 m^{3})
- Surface elevation: 4,157 ft (1,267 m)

1959 Survey of Botens Reservoir

Botens Reservoir is a 3.4-acre (0.01 km^{2}), small reservoir located in the northwestern portion of the Klamath Basin, in Southern Klamath County, Oregon. The reservoir is at an elevation of 4157 feet (1267 Meters).

Botens Reservoir receives water from an unnamed dry draw, in which the reservoir was constructed. It is held by the Botens Reservoir Dam, an earth dam constructed in 1947. The dam measures 180 feet long and 10 feet wide. Water flows through a 15 foot cement pipe built through the dam and is a tributary of the Klamath River.

== History ==
Charles Kerr, of Klamath Falls, first applied to the AAA to construct the dam sometime before fall of 1946, when construction began. When it was discovered that the dam would have to be over 10 feet high to be of any particular value as a storage reservoir, Kerr submitted an application to the state engineer Lewis A. Stanley and decided to use excess water for irrigation. Construction was almost completed by February 11, 1947. The application for the permit to the state engineer was submitted on February 17, 1947. Construction work was completed by April 1, 1947, with a total cost of 2,000 dollars. The application was approved on July 20, 1956 for the appropriated use of stock and irrigation.

On October 29, 1959 the state conducted a survey on the dam, by M. Beih. By this time the reservoir was under the name of Paul A. and Mamie Breitenstien. On September 23, 1960 the reservoir received its water right certificate. The dam along with the reservoir appeared in a book about Oregon's submerged lands in 1970, however, it was not recognized by USGS until May 21, 1986 when it appeared in a map originating in Oregon. As of April 7, 2021 the reservoir was under the ownership of Timothy M. Howard. The reservoir is regulated by the Oregon Water Resources Department and is inspected every 6 years, with a last inspection date of November 17, 2023.
