= Little Crater Lake =

Lake in Oregon, United States

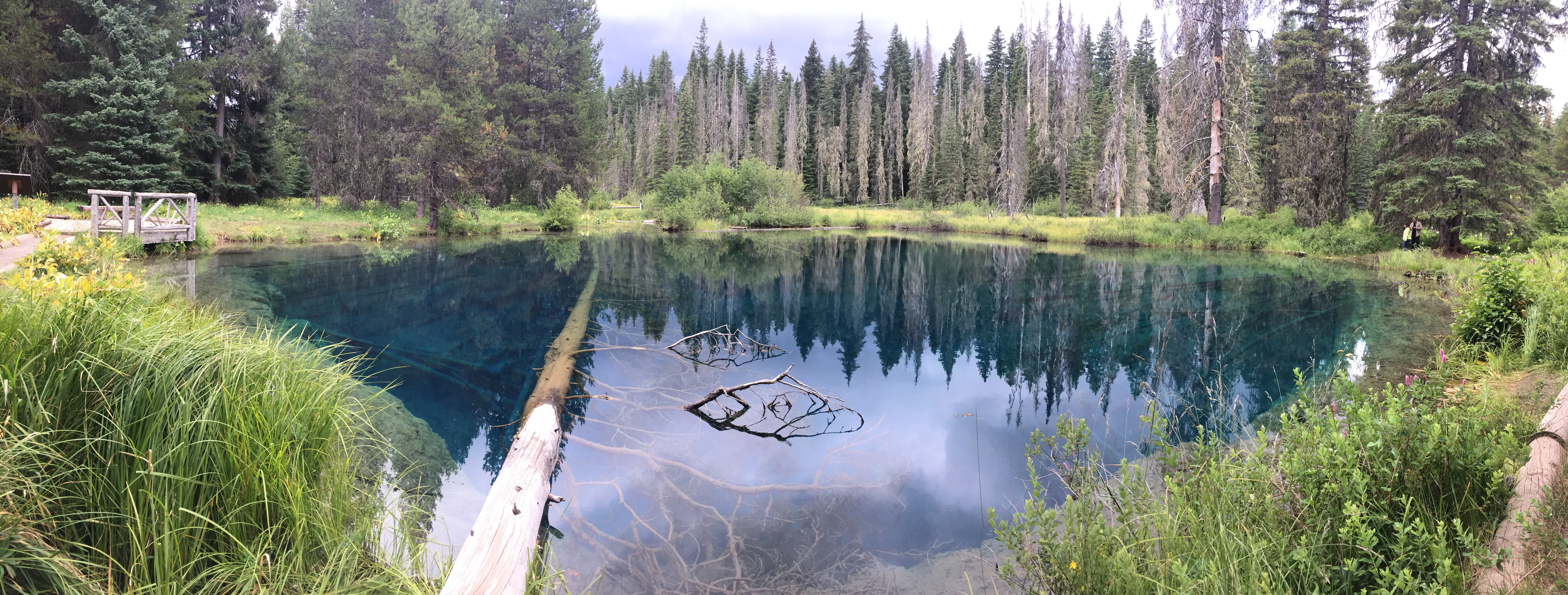

- Location within Oregon Location within the United States
- Location: Mount Hood National Forest, Clackamas County, Oregon, U.S.
- Coordinates: 45.1478°N 121.7477°W
- Primary inflows: Cold spring
- Max. width: 100 feet (30 m)
- Max. depth: 45 feet (14 m)

Little Crater Lake is a spring-fed lake in the Mount Hood National Forest in Clackamas County, Oregon, United States. It is named after Crater Lake, also in Oregon.

== Geology ==
Little Crater Lake is considered an oddity, with earlier geologists theorizing it formed from a collapsed lava tube because of its steep and overhanging walls. Later geologists believe it originated from a volcanic maar or was created from block faulting. Artesian water from an underground spring fills the resulting depression with water. The lake was named after Crater Lake, also in Oregon, due to their shared blue waters. The water in Little Crater Lake is a constant 33.3 °F (0.7222222 °C).

== See also ==
- Crater Lake
