= Lake Harriet (Oregon) =

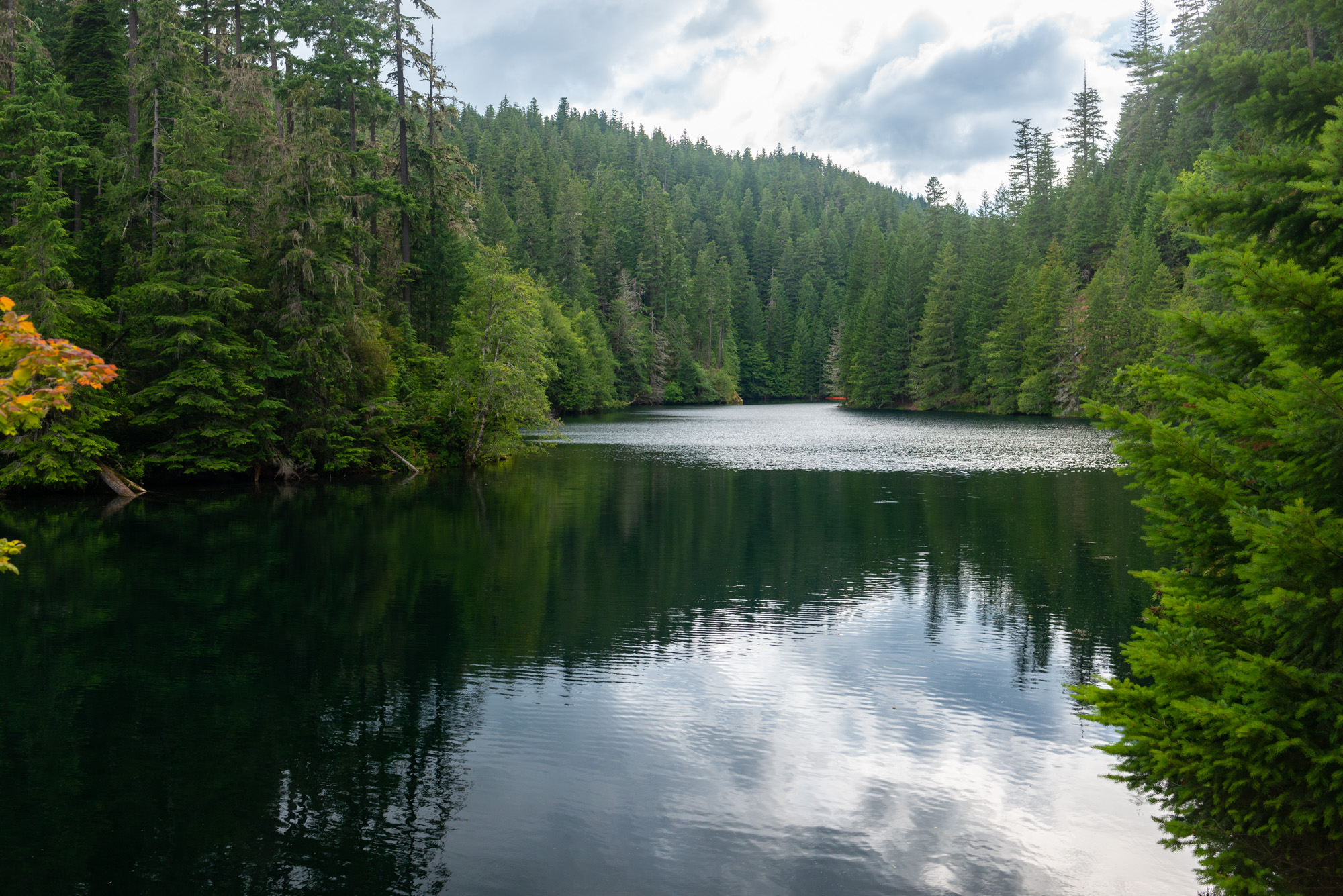
- Lake Harriet in 2019

- Location within Oregon Location within the United States
- Location: Mount Hood National Forest, Clackamas County, Oregon
- Coordinates: 45.074566°N 121.969802°W
- Type: reservoir
- Primary inflows: Oak Grove Fork Clackamas River
- Primary outflows: Oak Grove Fork Clackamas River
- Basin countries: United States
- Max. length: 3,000 ft (910 m)
- Max. width: 300 ft (91 m)
- Surface elevation: 2,037 ft (621 m)

Lake Harriet is a reservoir in Clackamas County of the U.S. state of Oregon.

It is an impoundment of the Oak Grove Fork Clackamas River, located 75 kilometres (47 mi) southeast of Portland and 31 kilometres (19 mi) southwest of Government Camp.

== See also ==
- List of lakes in Oregon
