= Ripplebrook, Oregon =

Unincorporated community in the state of Oregon, United States

- Unincorporated community
- Location within Oregon
- Coordinates: 45°04′56″N 122°02′36″W
- Country: United States
- State: Oregon
- County: Clackamas
- Elevation: 1,588 ft (484 m)
- Time zone: UTC-8 (Pacific (PST))
  - Summer (DST): UTC-7 (PDT)
- ZIP code: 97023
- GNIS feature ID: 1134277

Ripplebrook is an unincorporated community in Clackamas County, Oregon, United States. It is located at the eastern terminus of Oregon Route 224, at an intersection with forest highways 46 and 57, in the Mount Hood National Forest. It is near the confluence of the Clackamas River with the Oak Grove Fork Clackamas River, and is the only community on the route between Estacada and Detroit. Ripplebrook Ranger Station (a.k.a. Ripplebrook Guard Station) is located there. Bathrooms and information are available, but no other services.

== Forest Service compound ==
The United States Forest Service compound at Ripplebrook includes an office, various work buildings, three bunkhouses, a heliport, and a housing area. The office is located just off of Route 224. The fire warehouse, the compound's gas house, a carpenter's shop, and a silviculture building are located near the office. The heliport is behind the office area along Forest Road 4600. Bunkhouse A and B are located along Forest Road 4631. Bunkhouse C is near the heliport and also serves as a heliport office. There are ten family homes in the housing area, which is on Eagles Rest Road, just off of Forest Road 4631. Some of the Forest Service facilities are now used by the Timber Lake Job Corps Center.
