= Cazadero =

Cazadero may refer to:

- Cazadero (volcano), a mountain in Argentina
- Cazadero, California, U.S.
- Cazadero, Oregon, U.S.
- Cazadero Dam, a dam in the U.S. state of Oregon
