= River Mill Hydroelectric Project =

Hydroelectric project in Clackamas County, Oregon, US

- U.S. National Register of Historic Places
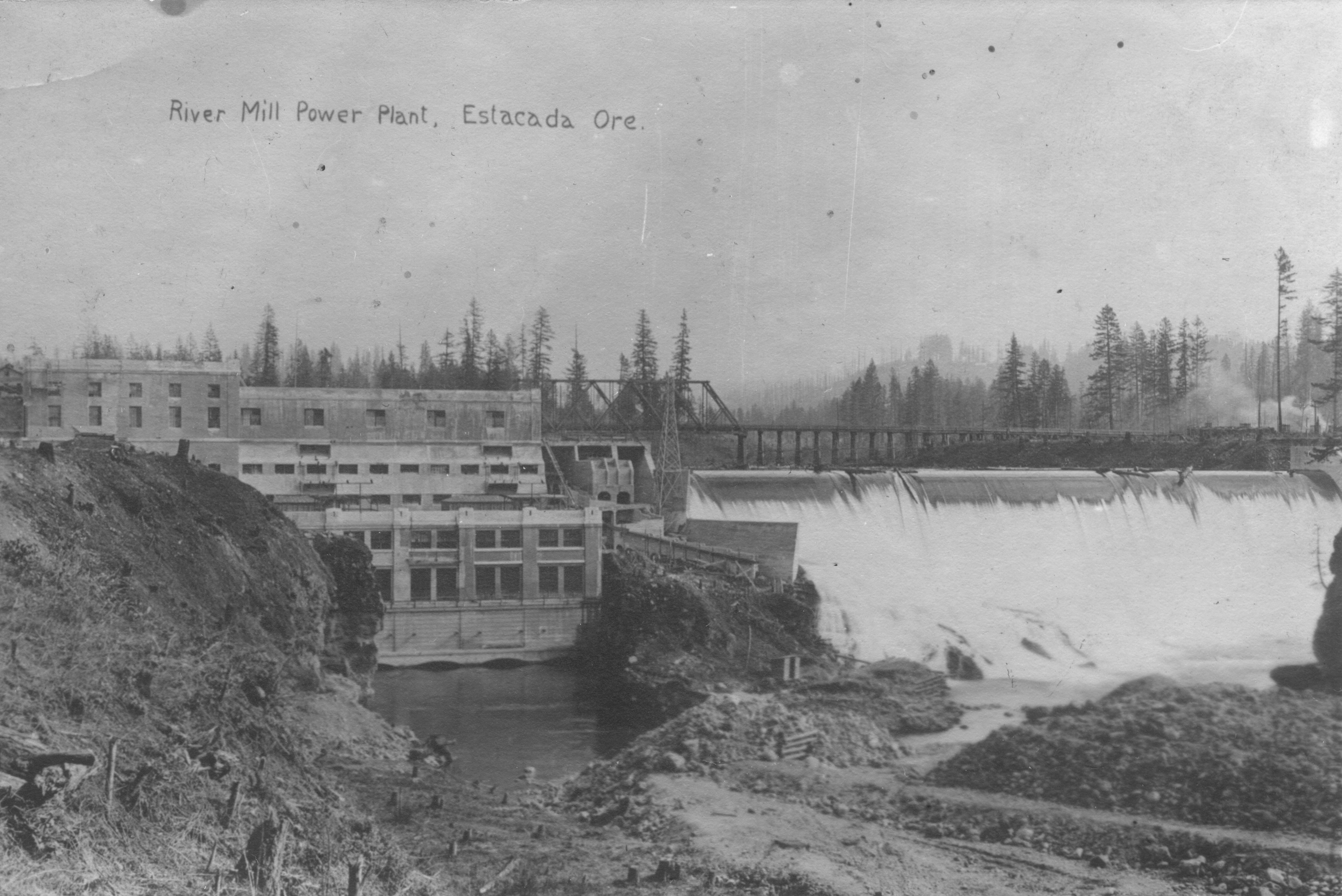
- River Mill dam c. 1911

- Location within Oregon Location within the United States
- Nearest city: Estacada, Oregon
- Coordinates: 45°17′58″N 122°21′2″W
- Area: 5 acres (2.0 ha)
- Built: 1911
- Architect: Nils F. Ambursen, Puget Sound Bridge & Dredging Co.
- Architectural style: Hydroelectric facility
- NRHP reference No.: 01000497
- Added to NRHP: May 10, 2001

River Mill Hydroelectric Project, also known as River Mill Dam and Station M, is a hydroelectric dam and powerhouse in Clackamas County, Oregon, United States. It is just north of Estacada, Oregon, on the Clackamas River at river mile 23.5 (km 37.8). It received its name from being near a sawmill that was located along the river.

The dam has been in continuous production of hydroelectric power since 1911, when its construction was funded by the Portland Railway, Light and Power Company. It was one of four related projects on the Clackamas River: the Oak Grove Hydroelectric Project (developed 1923–56), the North Fork dam (1958), and the Faraday Dam (1907–10), all upstream (south) of River Mill. All but Faraday, demolished 2018, are still owned and operated by the successor company, Portland General Electric.

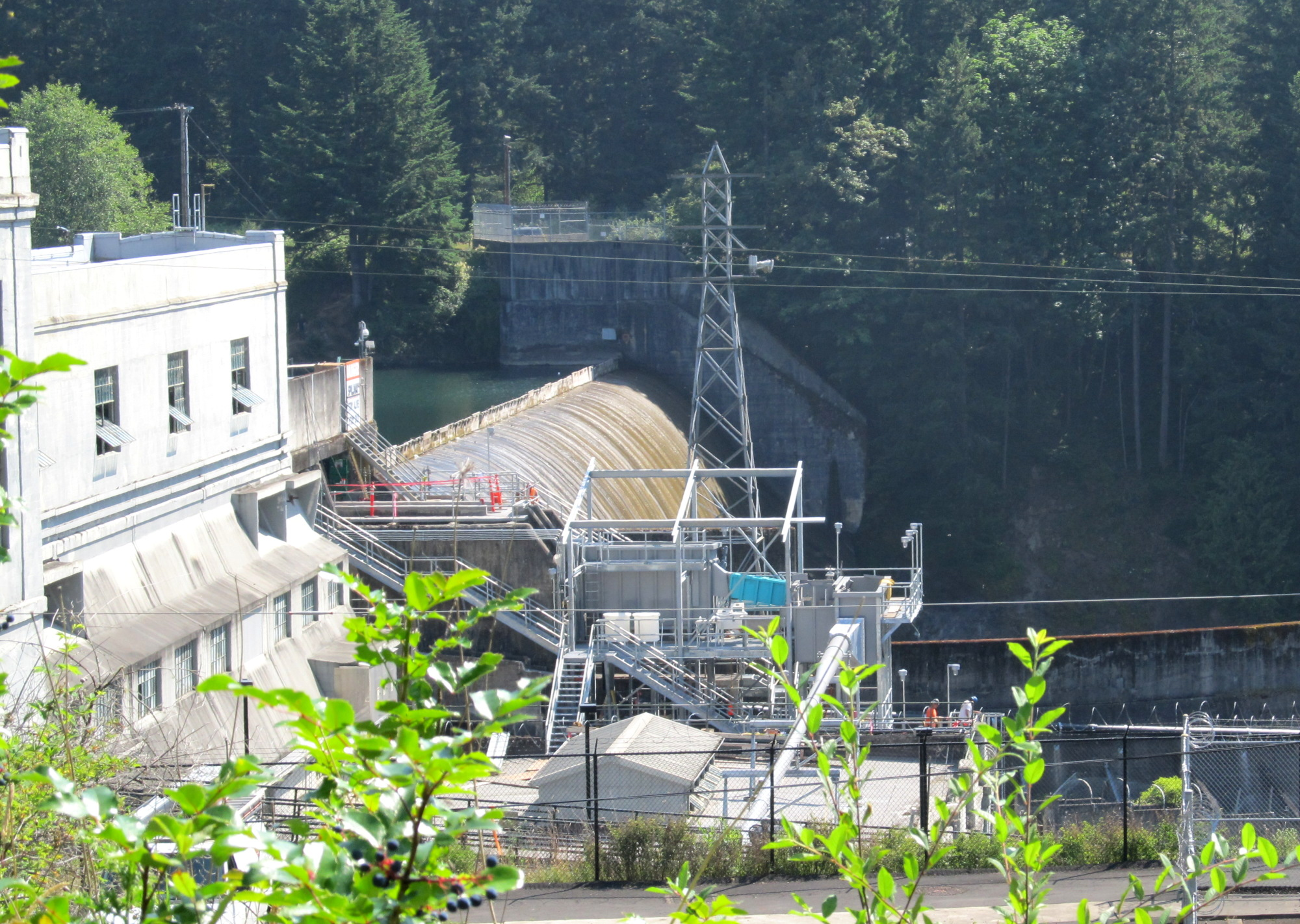
River Mill dam, view from east bank

The principal designer of the original Mill Run Dam was the Norwegian immigrant Nils F. Ambursen (1876–1958). Based in Boston, his Ambursen Hydraulic Construction Company designed over a hundred dams in the United States from 1903 through 1917. Ambursen's patented concrete-slab-and-buttress dam design was a significant advance in dam design of this era. River Mill is one of only three Ambursen-type dams built west of the Mississippi.

The project is listed on the National Register of Historic Places, and in the Oregon Historic Sites Database of the Oregon State Historic Preservation Office.

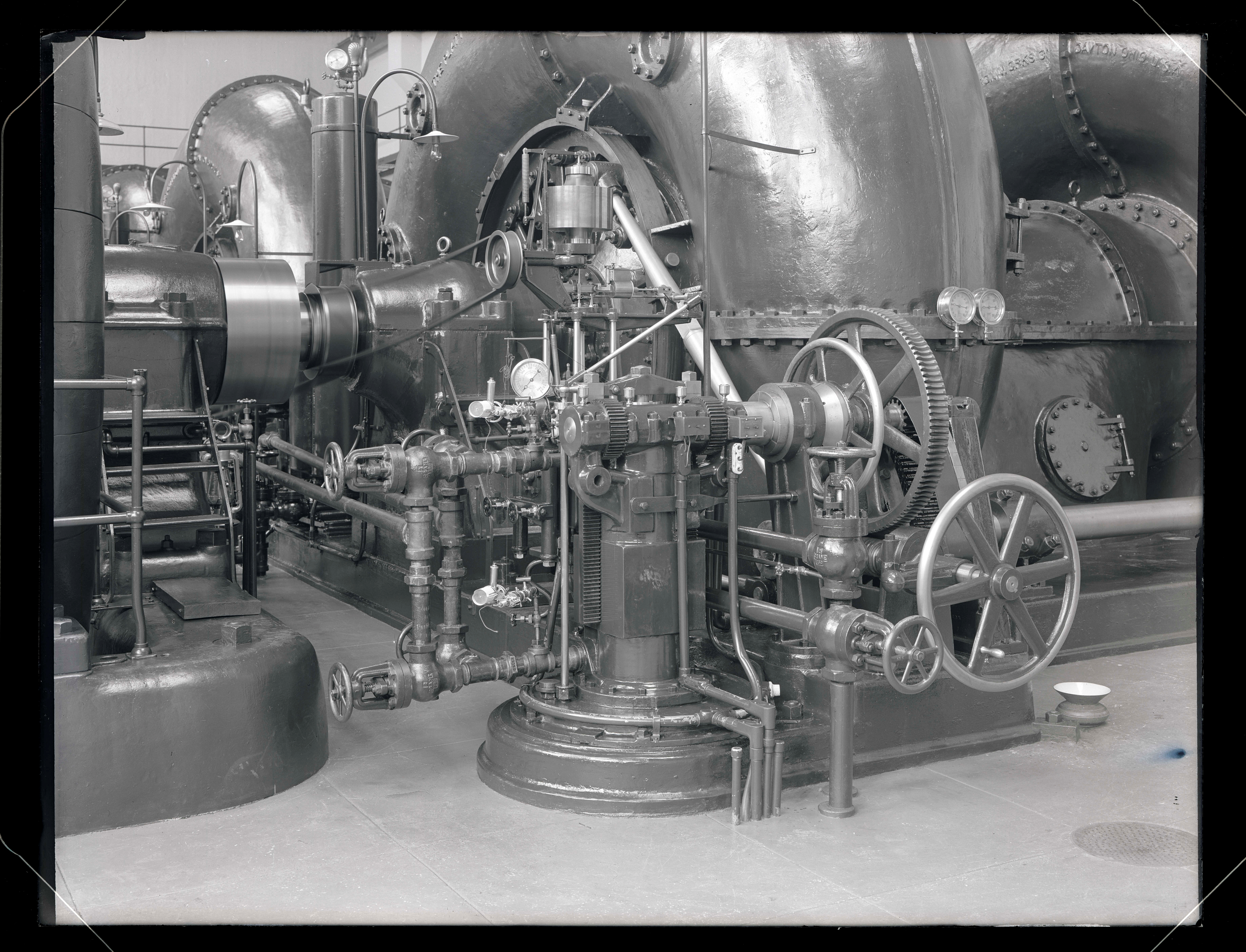
Governor in River Mill dam.
