= North Fork Reservoir (Clackamas County, Oregon) =

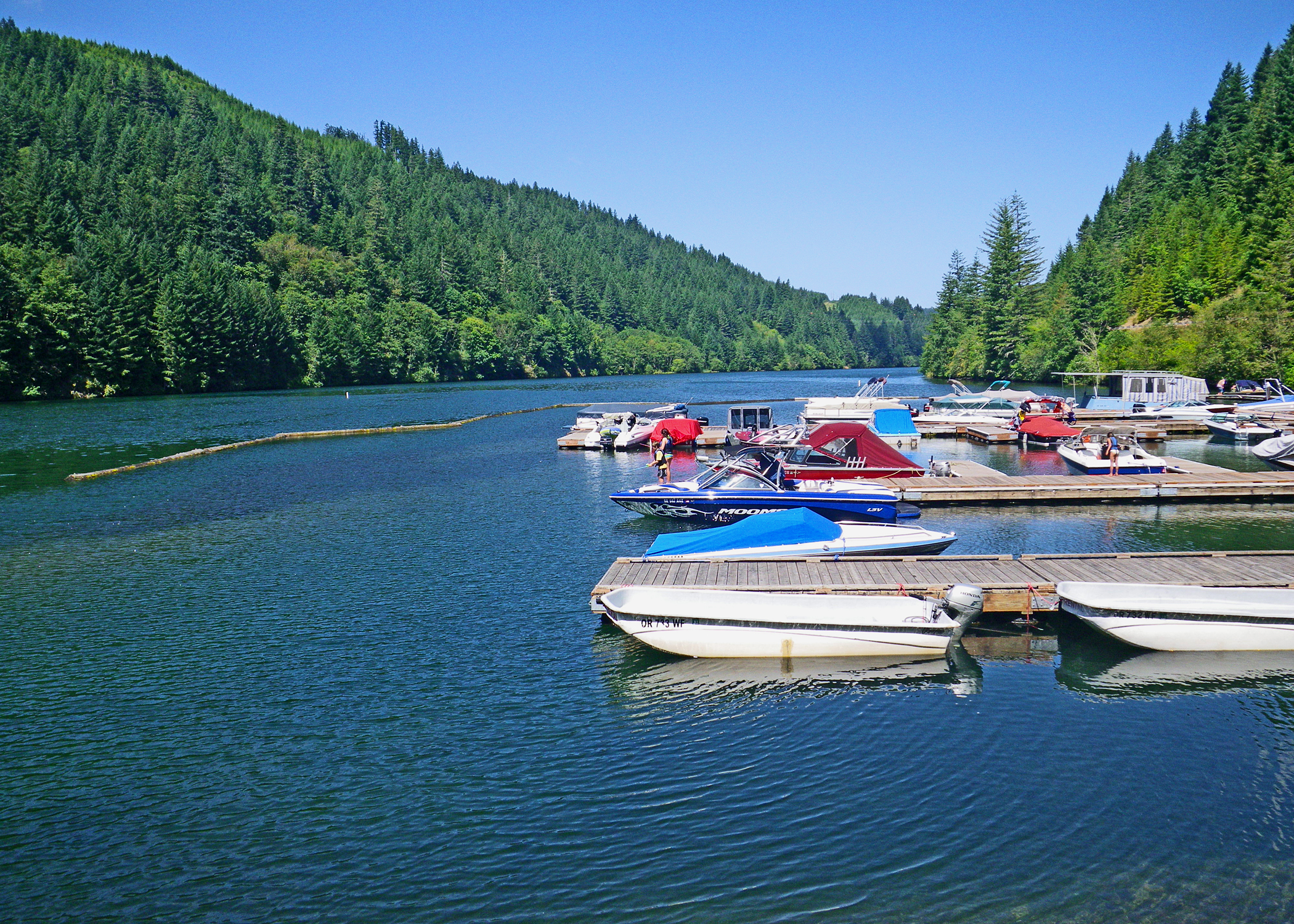

- Location within Oregon Location within the United States
- Location: Clackamas County, Oregon
- Coordinates: 45.237°N 122.260°W
- Type: reservoir
- Primary inflows: Clackamas River
- Primary outflows: Clackamas River
- Surface elevation: 666 feet (203 m)

North Fork Reservoir is a reservoir behind North Fork Dam, on the Clackamas River, upriver from Estacada. It is found at an elevation of 666 feet (203 m).

== Location and construction ==
North Fork is in Clackamas County, Oregon, and is located five miles upriver from Estacada. The dam was built in 1958.

== Named for ==
North Fork Reservoir was named for the North Fork of the Clackamas that flows into the lake.

== Nearby dams ==
It is near River Mill Hydroelectric Project and Faraday Dam. Portland General Electric operates all dams and related infrastructure.

== Fishing ==
North Fork is a popular fishing area.

== Recreation ==
North Fork is near Portland, Oregon, is easily accessible, and is a popular recreation area. It is also a popular boating area.

== See also ==
- List of lakes in Oregon
