= Clackamas Wilderness =

Protected area in Oregon, United States

- IUCN category Ib (wilderness area)
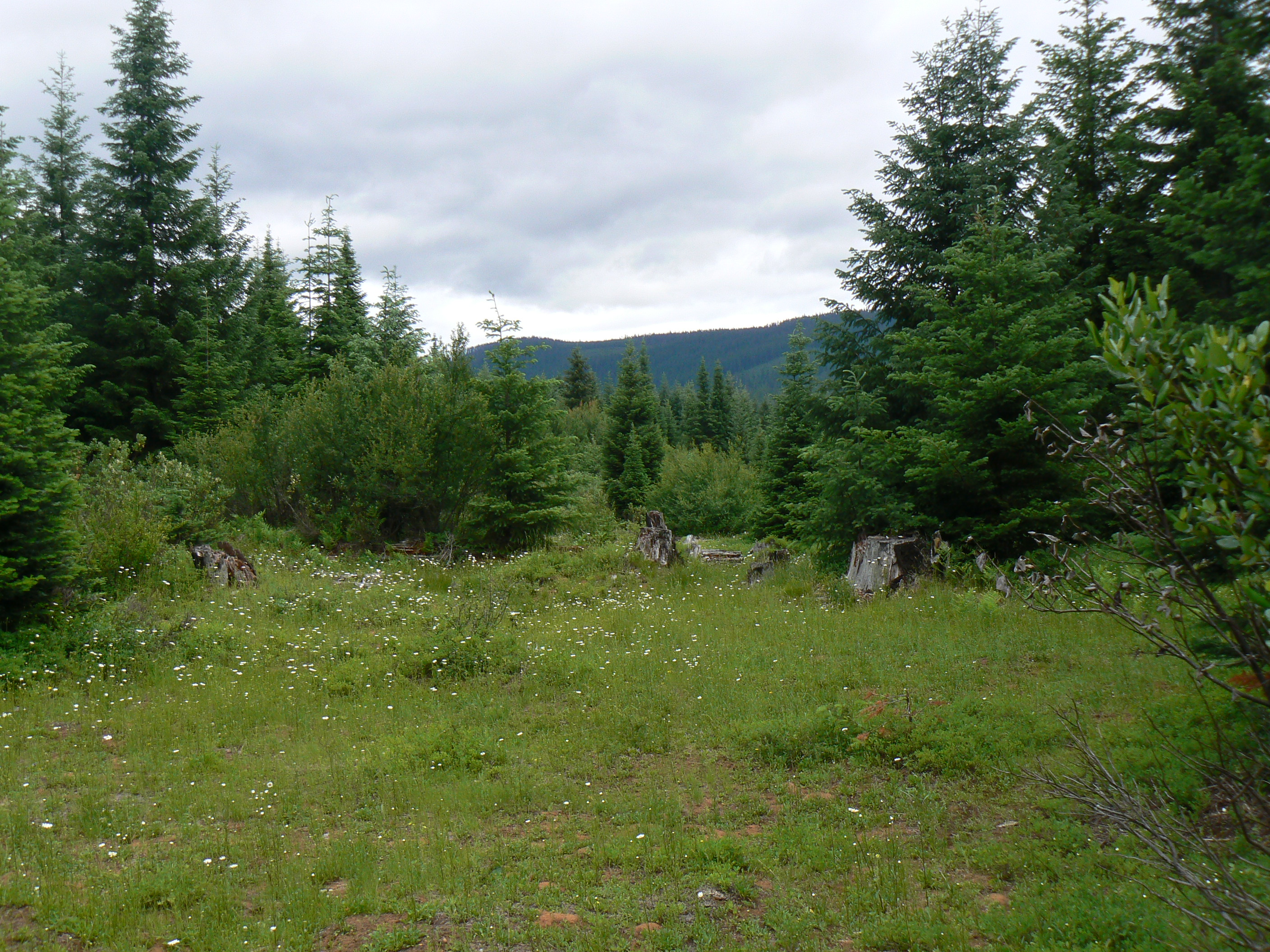
- Field in the Clackamas Wilderness, June 2008

- Location within Oregon Location within the United States
- Location: Clackamas County, Oregon, USA
- Nearest city: Detroit, Oregon
- Coordinates: 44°54′N 121°50′W
- Area: 9,470 acres (3,830 ha)
- Established: 2009
- Governing body: U.S. Forest Service

The Clackamas Wilderness is a wilderness area located in the Mount Hood National Forest in the northwestern Cascades of Oregon, United States. Created by the Omnibus Public Land Management Act of 2009, it consists of 9,470 acres (3,830 ha). The wilderness is made up of five different tracts of lands with no roads on a 50-mile (80 km) stretch on both sides of the Clackamas River. These areas include Big Bottom, Memaloose Lake, Clackamas Canyon, Sisi Butte and South Fork Clackamas. It has some of the biggest trees in northwest Oregon. Memaloose Lake is a very popular hiking trail that leads through a forest to the lake, and then continues a mile up to a viewpoint on to up South Fork Mountain.
