= North Fork Clackamas River =

- Location of the mouth of the North Fork Clackamas River in Oregon
- Etymology: Clackamas tribe

Location
- Country: United States
- State: Oregon
- County: Clackamas

Physical characteristics
- Source
  - location: Cascade Range, Clackamas County, Oregon
  - coordinates: 45°13′38″N 122°02′44″W
  - elevation: 3,963 ft (1,208 m)
- Mouth: Clackamas River
  - location: North Fork Reservoir, Clackamas County, Oregon
  - coordinates: 45°13′56″N 122°15′16″W
  - elevation: 666 ft (203 m)
- Length: 11 mi (18 km)
- Basin size: 47 sq mi (120 km^{2})

The North Fork Clackamas River is a tributary, about 11 miles (18 km) long, of the Clackamas River in the U.S. state of Oregon. Originating at nearly 4,000 feet (1,200 m) above sea level on the west side of the Cascade Range, it flows westward through Mount Hood National Forest. It joins the Clackamas at North Fork Reservoir, about 32 miles (51 km) from the larger river's confluence with the Willamette River. From source to mouth, the following tributaries enter the river: Dry Creek from the right bank, Boyer Creek from the left bank, then Whiskey, Bedford, Bee, and Fall creeks, all from the right.

Elevations in the watershed range from 4,770 feet (1,450 m) in the headwaters on Tumala Mountain to 660 feet (200 m) at the river mouth. Prominent landforms include Ladee Flats, a flat-topped ridge composed of lava flows resistant to erosion. The North Fork valley is narrow and steep, and a 50-foot (15 m) waterfall 2.5 miles (4.0 km) from the mouth limits passage of migratory fish. Native rainbow and cutthroat trout are found in the upper river and its tributaries, while the lower river has winter and summer steelhead, coho salmon, spring chinook, and stocked rainbow trout.

== See also ==
- List of rivers of Oregon

== Works cited ==
- North Fork Clackamas River Watershed Analysis: Final Report (1996). United States Department of Agriculture, U.S. Forest Service, and the Bureau of Land Management. Retrieved on March 19, 2009.
