= North Fork Dam (Clackamas County, Oregon) =

- Location within Oregon
- Country: United States
- Location: Clackamas, Oregon
- Coordinates: 45°14′36″N 122°16′47″W

Dam and spillways
- Height: 206 ft (63 m)
- Length: 676 ft (206 m)
- Width (crest): 8 ft (2.4 m)
- Width (base): 32 ft (9.8 m)

The North Fork Dam is on the Clackamas River, about five miles upriver from Estacada, Oregon. It was built in 1958. The North Fork Reservoir is behind it.

== Construction ==
It is a concrete arched dam, 206 feet (63 m) high and 676 feet (206 m) long, is thin-shell of variable thickness. It varies in thickness from 32 feet (9.8 m) at the base to 8 feet (2.4 m) wide at the top.

== The fish ladder ==
North Fork's construction entailed the building of the 1.9 miles (3.1 km) long North Fork Fish Ladder, one of the longest in the world. It also required a complex system to provide for downstream fish passage around the dam.
