= Oak Grove Fork Clackamas River =

- Location of the mouth of the Oak Grove Fork Clackamas River in Oregon
- Etymology: For Oak Grove, an early name for Wapinitia in Wasco County, towards which the river generally leads, going upstream

Location
- Country: United States
- State: Oregon
- County: Clackamas

Physical characteristics
- Source: near Abbot Pass
  - location: Cascade Range, Clackamas County, Oregon
  - coordinates: 45°07′11″N 121°41′07″W
  - elevation: 3,719 ft (1,134 m)
- Mouth: Clackamas River
  - location: near Ripplebrook, Clackamas County, Oregon
  - coordinates: 45°04′28″N 122°03′08″W
  - elevation: 1,362 ft (415 m)
- Length: 21 mi (34 km)
- Basin size: 124 sq mi (320 km^{2})
- Discharge
  - location: upstream of hydroelectric dam intake, 6.7 miles (10.8 km) from mouth
  - average: 486 cu ft/s (13.8 m^{3}/s)
  - minimum: 128 cu ft/s (3.6 m^{3}/s)
  - maximum: 5,000 cu ft/s (140 m^{3}/s)

Oak Grove Fork Clackamas River is a 21-mile (34 km) tributary of the Clackamas River in the U.S. state of Oregon. From its headwaters in the Warm Springs Indian Reservation near Abbot Pass in the Cascade Range, the river flows generally west through Mount Hood National Forest in Clackamas County to the unincorporated community of Ripplebrook. Here it enters the main stem of the Clackamas River. Oak Grove Fork feeds Timothy Lake and Lake Harriet, two artificial impoundments built along its course to control water flows to hydroelectric plants.

== Course ==
The Oak Grove Fork Clackamas River arises at an elevation of 3,719 feet (1,134 m) above sea level and falls 2,357 feet (718 m) between source and mouth to an elevation of 1,362 feet (415 m). The main stem begins in the Cascade Range near Abbot Pass, a mountain gap at 45°07′50″N 121°42′18″W, on the border between Clackamas County and Wasco County. Originating on the Warm Springs Indian Reservation, the river flows generally west about 21 miles (34 km) through the Mount Hood National Forest to the unincorporated community of Ripplebrook, where it joins the main stem of the Clackamas River.

From its source, the river flows about 2 miles (3.2 km) through a landform known as Big Meadows before leaving the reservation. Shortly thereafter, it crosses the Pacific Crest Trail, which follows the river from there to Timothy Lake. Oak Grove Fork then flows between the Clackamas Lake Campground and Clackamas Lake, which lies to the left of the river, before entering Timothy Lake about 17 miles (27 km) from the mouth. From here to Ripplebrook, Forest Road 57 follows the river. Campgrounds on the lake shore to the left include Oak Fork, Gone Creek, Hood View, and Pine Point. Meditation Point Campground lies on the opposite shore. While flowing through Timothy Lake, the elevation of which is 3,227 feet (984 m) above sea level, Oak Grove Fork receives Crater Creek, Cooper Creek, and Dinger Creek, all from the right. The river exits the lake via a spillway 15.8 miles (25.4 km) from the mouth.

Just 0.3 miles (0.48 km) below the spillway, the river passes the USGS gauge station at Timothy Lake, then receives Anvil Creek from the right, Stone Creek from the left, Buck Creek from the right, Peavine Creek from the left, and Shellrock Creek and Cat Creek, both from the right, before reaching the USGS gauge above Lake Harriet. Lake Harriet Campground lies along the shore to the right. Flowing through the lake, the river receives Kelley Creek from the left, then exits the lake and receives Sam Creek from the left about 6 miles (9.7 km) from the mouth. Then the river receives Skunk Creek and Canyon Creek from the right, Butte Creek from the left, and Station Creek and Pint Creek, both from the right, before passing Ripplebrook, Ripplebrook Campground, the Ripplebrook Ranger Station and Heliport, and the southeastern terminus of Oregon Route 224, which all lie to the right. Shortly thereafter, the river flows by Rainbow Campground, which lies to the left, and enters the Clackamas River about 53 miles (85 km) above its confluence with the Willamette River at Gladstone.

=== Discharge ===
The United States Geological Survey monitors the flow of Oak Grove Fork at two stations, one below Timothy Lake, 15.5 miles (24.9 km) from the mouth, and the other above a Portland General Electric (PGE) power plant intake, 6.7 miles (10.8 km) from the mouth. The average flow of the river at the Timothy Lake gauge is 133 cubic feet per second (3.8 m^{3}/s). This is from a drainage basin of 54.4 square miles (140.9 km^{2}). The maximum flow recorded there was 2,110 cubic feet per second (60 m^{3}/s) on December 24, 1964, and the minimum flow was 3.7 cubic feet per second (0.10 m^{3}/s) on September 23, 1968. At the power plant gauge, the average flow is 486 cubic feet per second (13.8 m^{3}/s) from a drainage basin of 124 square miles (320 km^{2}). The maximum flow recorded there was 5,000 cubic feet per second (140 m^{3}/s) on January 7, 1923, and the minimum flow was 128 cubic feet per second (3.6 m^{3}/s) on August 16, 2004.

== Fishing ==
The Oak Grove Fork has fishing for Brook trout (Salvelinus fontinalis) close to the Timothy Lake dam, wild coastal cutthroat trout (Oncorhynchus clarki clarkii), and Rainbow trout (Oncorhynchus mykiss irideus) further down, and Brown trout (Salmo trutta) close to Harriet Lake. All species respond well to flies or artificial baits. Only artificial lures and flies allowed on the Oak Grove Fork, with barbless hooks.

== Hydroelectric dams ==
As part of its efforts to generate electricity from water power in the Clackamas River basin, PGE built a dam on the Oak Grove Fork in 1923. The company's power plant at Lake Harriet, created by the dam, began making electricity in 1924. To regulate flows on the Oak Grove Fork and on the mainstem Clackamas River, the company built a dam at Timothy Meadows, upstream of Harriet Lake, in 1956. The new dam formed Timothy Lake, a 1,440-acre (580 ha) impoundment that doubles as a recreation site.

== See also ==
- List of rivers of Oregon
