= Estacada School District =

Location
- Estacada, Oregon United States

District information
- Motto: "Inspire, Engage, Achieve"
- Superintendent: Ryan Carpenter
- Schools: 4
- Budget: $37,499,000

Students and staff
- Students: 3,025
- Teachers: 126
- Student–teacher ratio: 24:1

Other information
- Website: https://www.estacadaschools.org

Estacada Public School District (E108) is a public school district in Northern Oregon. The district serves the towns of Estacada, Eagle Creek, Oregon, and the surrounding countryside. As of 2023, the district serves 3,205 students. The Estacada School District closed twice in the 1980s due to voters rejecting budget levies.

== Demographics ==
Estacada School District's student count of 3,025 is 76% white. For other demographics, the student body is 13.3% Hispanic/Latinx, 2.2% Asian or Pacific Islander, and 1.7% Black. 6% of students reported as mixed race. Overall 23.9% of students are minorities, with 0.1% choosing not to report.

Gender enrollment in ESD is an even 50–50 split between male and female.

== Schools ==
Estacada SD has one high school, one middle school, and two elementary schools.

Estacada High School, the district's public high school, is located in central Estacada. In 2023, EHS had an enrollment of 486. 16% of students identified as disabled, and 13% of students were in an ESL or ELD program. A bond has been proposed to completely renovate the building.

Estacada Middle School (sometimes Estacada Junior High) is the district's only middle school, serving grades 6, 7, and 8. The property also includes EHS's football field. In 2023, EMS had an enrollment of 423. 16% of its students identified as disabled and 11% of students were in an ESL or ELD program.

There are also two K-5 elementary schools in the district, Clackamas River Elementary and River Mill Elementary. In 2023, there were a total of 958 students in the two elementary schools.

Along with these public schools, the district also operates an online K-12 charter school, Estacada Web Academy.

== School Board ==
ESD has a school board consisting of 7 local citizens.

- Ken Riedel, Chair
- Ben Wheeler, Vice chair
- Rosa Martinez
- Will Johnston
- John Walper
- Rochelle Shibahara
- Joe Behrman
