= Molalla High School =

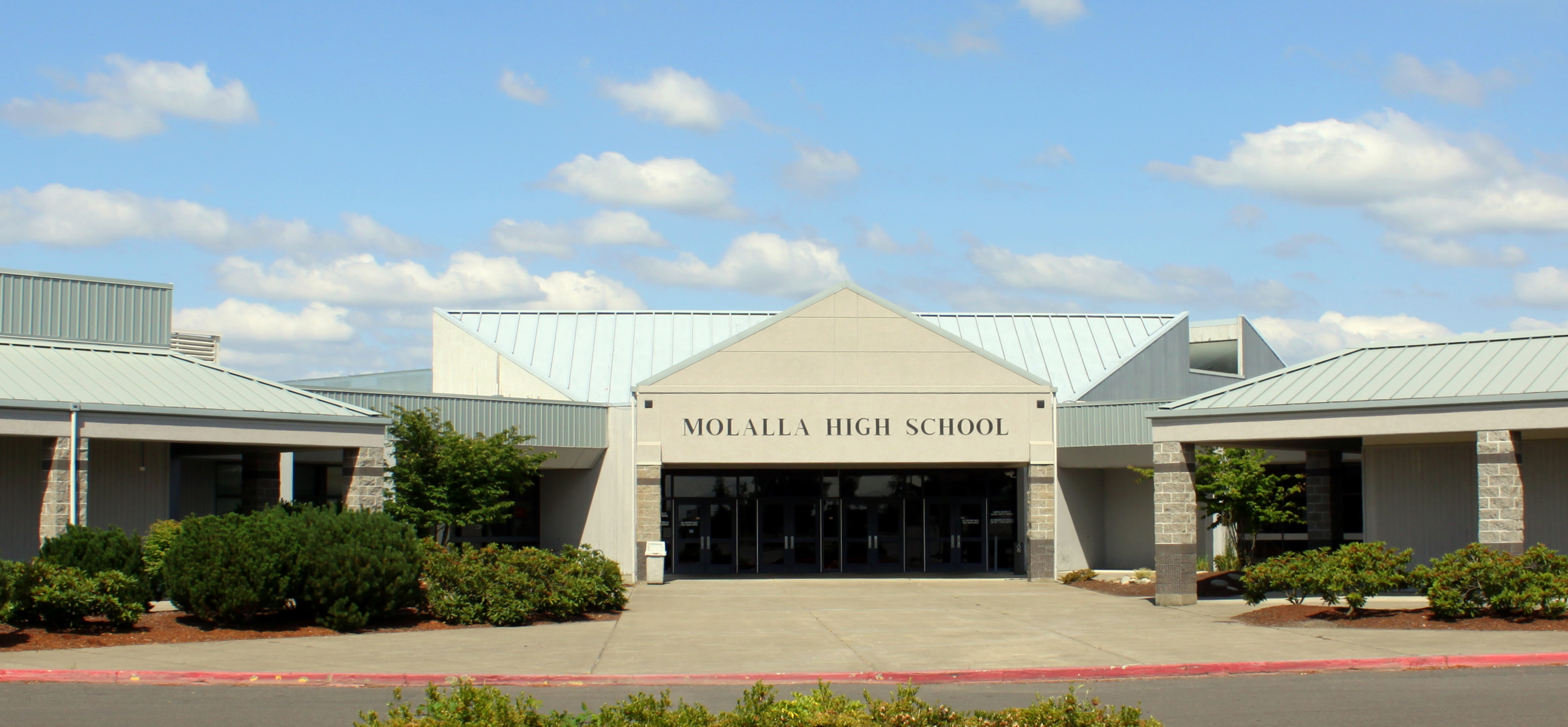

Location
- 357 Frances Street; Molalla, (Clackamas), Oregon 97038; United States; 45.1538889°N 122.5686111°W

Information
- Type: Public
- Opened: 1906
- School district: Molalla River School District
- Principal: David Atherton
- Teaching staff: 40.25 (FTE)
- Grades: 9-12
- Enrollment: 745 (2024-2025)
- Student to teacher ratio: 18.51
- Colors: Orange and Black
- Athletics conference: OSAA Tri-Valley Conference 4A-2
- Mascot: Indian
- Team name: Molalla Indians
- Rival: Estacada High School
- Feeder schools: Molalla River Middle School
- Website: Molalla High School

Molalla High School (MHS) is a public high school in Molalla, Oregon, United States. It is one of two high schools in the Molalla River School District.

== History ==
Molalla's first school opened in 1856, and the first high-school course began in 1906. Molalla High School graduated its first class in 1911. The Molalla Union High School building was dedicated in February 1926, and served as the south campus for grades 9-12 until the 5.6 Richter Scotts Mills earthquake on March 25, 1993, rendered the building unsafe for students. The current high school, which previously served as the north campus for grades 9-12, has since been renovated to incorporate all four years of high school.

Following the Oregon Board of Education's 2012 ban of Native American school mascots (effective July 1, 2017), the Molalla River School District received approval from the Confederated Tribes of Grand Ronde to continue use of the Indians mascot. Under the terms of their 2017 agreement, the school's logo was changed to a bear and coyote among mountain trees. The agreement also requires that the district adopt the Grand Ronde Tribe's fourth- and eighth-grade history curricula and offer a Native Club for high school students.

== Academics ==
In 2008, 81% of the school's seniors received their high school diploma. Of 182 students, 147 graduated, 15 dropped out, 11 received a modified diploma, and 9 are still in high school.

== Sports ==
The school's mascot is the Indian because the city of Molalla was named after the native Molalla Indians who populated the area. Fall sports include football, girls and boys soccer, cross country, and volleyball. In the winter the sports are swimming, girls and boys basketball, and wrestling. In the spring the sports are girls and boys tennis, golf, track and field, baseball, and softball.
