= Estacada High School =

Oregon high school

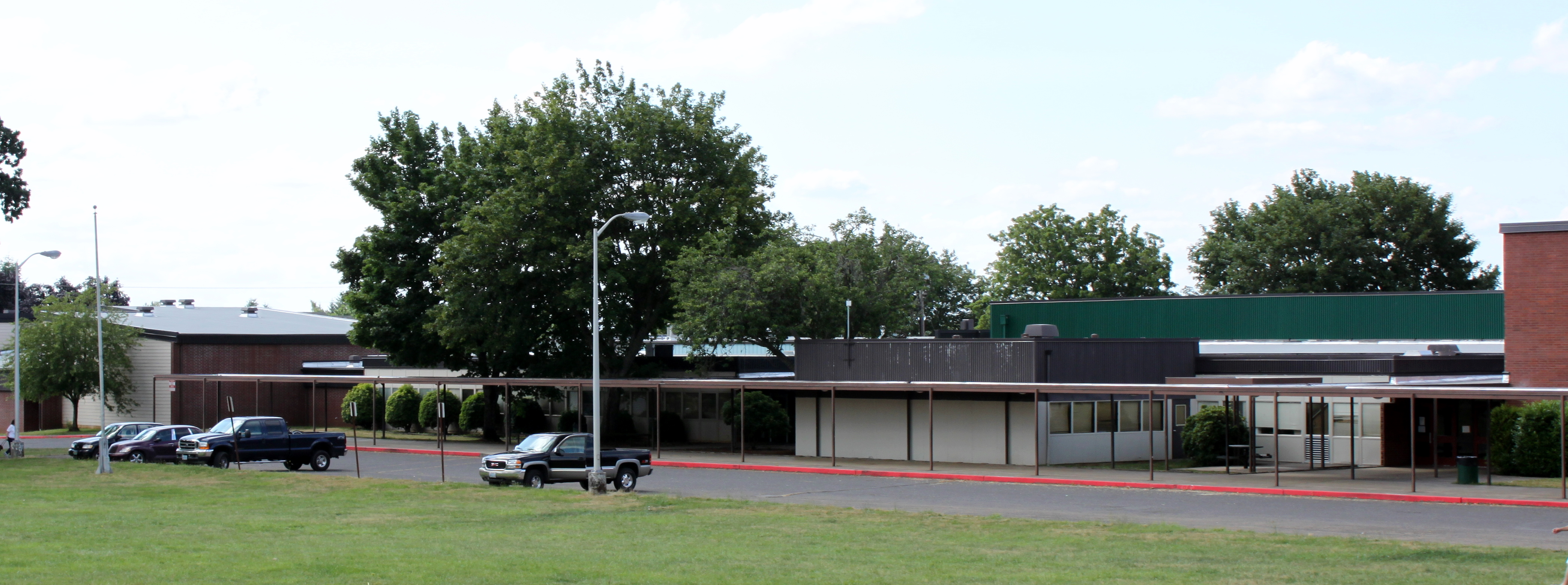

Location
- 355 NE 6th Ave. Estacada, (Clackamas County), Oregon 97023; United States; 45.295388°N 122.331433°W

Information
- Type: Public
- Established: 1905
- School district: Estacada School District
- Principal: Leah Riedel
- Teaching staff: 22.95 (FTE)
- Grades: 9-12
- Enrollment: 548 (2023–2024)
- Student to teacher ratio: 23.88
- Colors: Green and white
- Athletics conference: OSAA 4A-2 Tri-Valley Conference
- Mascot: Ranger
- Team name: Rangers
- Rival: Molalla High School
- Newspaper: The Hycada
- Feeder schools: Estacada Middle School
- Website: www.ehs.estacada.k12.or.us

Estacada High School (EHS) is a public high school in Estacada, Oregon, United States.

== Academics ==
In 2008, 69% of the school's seniors received a high school diploma. Of 200 students, 138 graduated, 48 dropped out, nine received a modified diploma, and five were still in high school as of June 2009.

In 2022, 87% of the school's seniors received a high school diploma. Of 111 students, 100 graduated and 11 dropped out.

== Athletics ==
Estacada High School competes in the OSAA 4A-2 Tri-Valley Conference. The school's athletic director is Andrew Mott and the athletics secretary is Jenny Durand.

Estacada High currently holds the following state titles:

- Football: 2022
- Volleyball: 2003, 2005
- Wrestling: 1977
- Dance/Drill: 2004
- Boys Track and Field: 2005
- Girls Track and Field: 1969
