= Clackamas =

The word Clackamas may refer to:

- Clackamas people, a Native American people in what is now Oregon
- The now extinct language spoken by the tribe, one of the Chinookan languages

== Named after tribe ==
- The Clackamas River, a tributary of the Willamette River in northwestern Oregon
- Clackamas County, Oregon
  - Clackamas, Oregon, a community in Clackamas County
    - Clackamas High School in Clackamas, Oregon
  - Clackamas Community College in Oregon City, Clackamas County
  - The North Clackamas School District in Clackamas County
- Clackamas iris or Iris tenuis
- "Clackamas", a codename for Intel's 64-bit processor technology
