= Cazadero, Oregon =

Unincorporated community in the state of Oregon, United States

Cazadero
- Unincorporated community
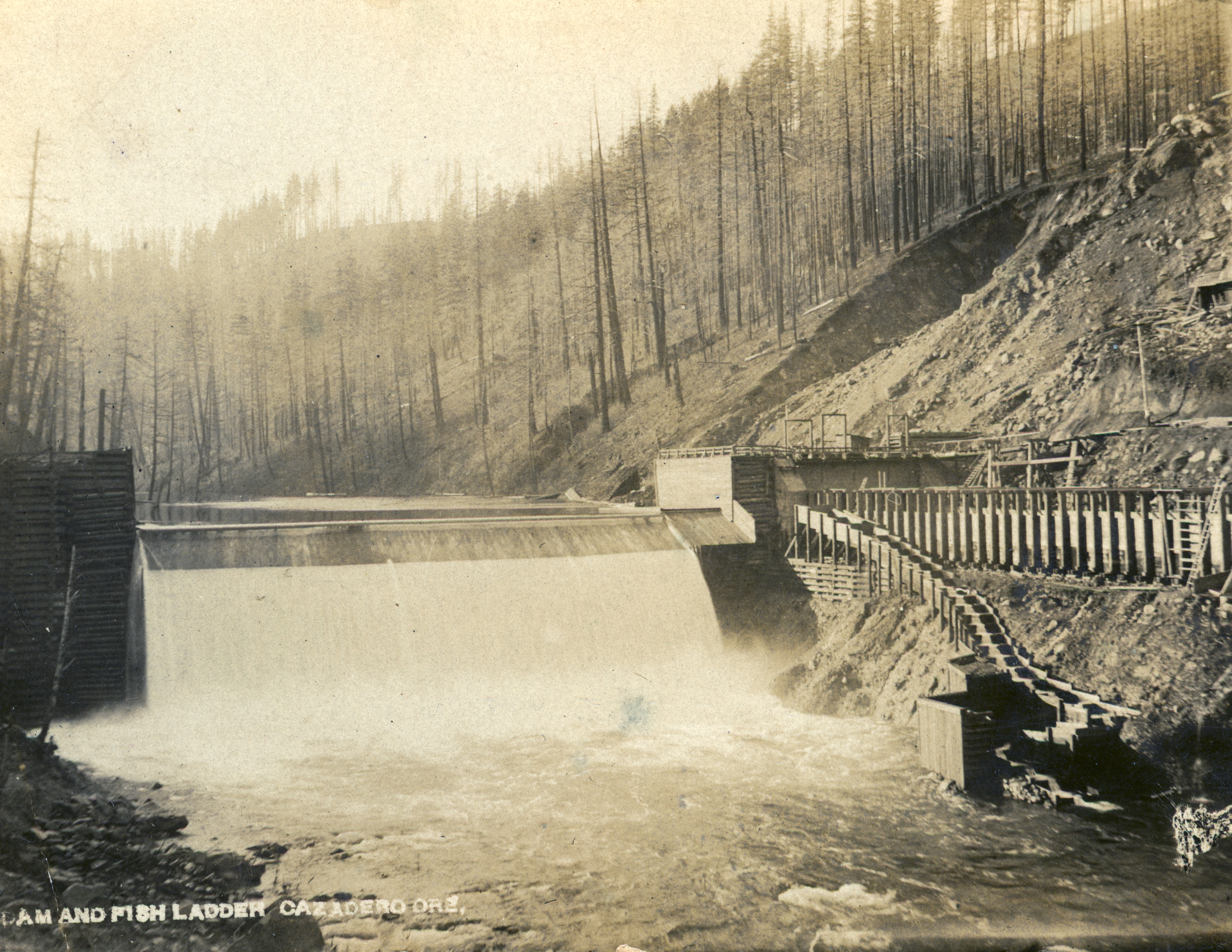
- Dam and fish ladder at Cazadero, c. 1904

- Location within the state of Oregon Cazadero (the United States)
- Coordinates: 45°15′59″N 122°18′22″W
- Country: United States
- State: Oregon
- County: Clackamas
- Established: 1903
- Time zone: UTC-8 (Pacific (PST))
  - Summer (DST): UTC-7 (PDT)
- GNIS feature ID: 1163860

Cazadero is an unincorporated historic locale in Clackamas County, Oregon, United States. Cazadero was a station on the Estacada interurban railway line of the Portland Railway, Light and Power Company (PRL&P) and later Portland Electric Power Company (PEPCO), near where the power plant of the PEPCO-owned Cazadero Dam was located on the Clackamas River.

The station was named by the original promoters of the line, likely after Cazadero, California. Cazadero is a Spanish word meaning "a place for the pursuit of game". Cazadero post office operated from 1904–1918; it was located southeast of Cazadero station, near what is now Oregon Route 224 at 45.262343°N 122.296195°W.

== Railway history ==
Service to Cazadero was routed via Lents and Gresham, along the Springwater Corridor, and the Gresham–Boring–Cazadero section was built in 1903–04, with electric interurban service reaching Boring in 1903 and Cazadero in 1904. The line was built and operated by the Oregon Water Power and Railway Company (OWP), but by 1906 OWP had been taken over the PRL&P, which in turn was reorganized as PEPCO in 1924.

Cazadero station was located three stations beyond Estacada on the interurban line and was the end of the line for many years, until PEPCO eventually developed the line farther up the river. The interurban service was abandoned in 1933, but the line remained intact and usable for freight service for many more years; for example, an excursion by railfans in an old interurban car covered the line in 1953.
