= Tumala Mountain =

Mountain in Oregon, United States

- Location within Oregon

Highest point
- Elevation: 4,773 ft (1,455 m) NAVD 88
- Prominence: 690 ft (210 m)
- Coordinates: 45°13′49″N 122°02′28″W

Geography
- Location: Clackamas County, Oregon, U.S.
- Parent range: Cascade Range
- Topo map: USGS Three Lynx

Tumala Mountain is part of the Clackamas Foothills near Mount Hood in the U.S. state of Oregon. It is located in Mount Hood National Forest, near the city of Estacada. The summit has an elevation of 4,773 feet (1,455 m).

In 2007, the Board on Geographic Names renamed the mountain, which was previously called Squaw Mountain, due to the word "squaw" being offensive. The word Tumala means "tomorrow" or "afterlife" in Chinook Wawa.
