= South Fork Clackamas River =

River in Clackamas County, Oregon

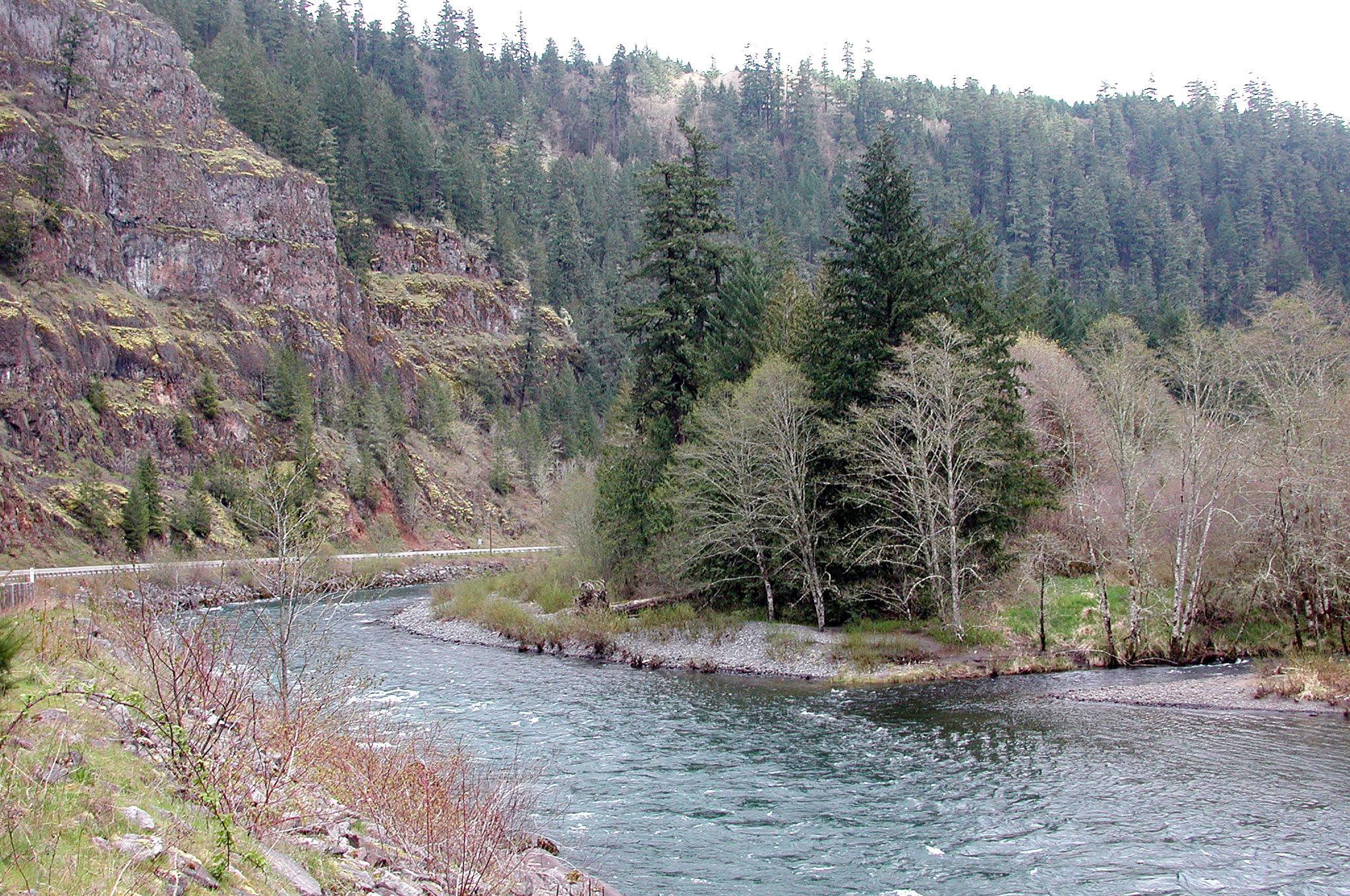
- South Fork (right) entering main stem at Big Cliff (left)

- Location of the mouth of the South Fork Clackamas River in Oregon
- Etymology: Clackamas tribe

Location
- Country: United States
- State: Oregon
- County: Clackamas

Physical characteristics
- Source: near South Fork Mountain, Mount Hood National Forest
  - location: Cascade Range, Clackamas County
  - coordinates: 45°05′31″N 122°15′12″W
  - elevation: 3,966 ft (1,209 m)
- Mouth: Clackamas River
  - location: Big Cliff, Clackamas County
  - coordinates: 45°11′56″N 122°13′27″W
  - elevation: 676 ft (206 m)
- Length: 8 mi (13 km)
- Basin size: 27.6 sq mi (71 km^{2})

The South Fork Clackamas River is a tributary, roughly 8 miles (13 km) long, of the Clackamas River in the U.S. state of Oregon. Beginning near South Fork Mountain in the western Cascade Range, the river flows generally north through Clackamas County to meet the larger river at Big Cliff. Most of the South Fork's drainage basin lies within the Mount Hood National Forest.

The lower reaches of the river are part of the National Wild and Scenic Rivers System. Recreational opportunities in the basin include hiking, camping, and fishing for trout. A 70-foot (21 m) waterfall prevents salmon and other migratory fish from swimming upriver beyond the first 0.4 miles (0.6 km).

== Course ==
Originating near South Fork Mountain in the Cascade Range, the river runs generally north through rugged terrain in the Mount Hood National Forest. Near the headwaters, the 8-mile (13 km) river flows northwest, passing under Forest Road 4540, which parallels the river's left bank for about 1 mile (1.6 km). At this point the river flows under Forest Road 45, a loop road that follows ridges to the left and right of the South Fork for much of the rest of its course.

Beyond Forest Road 45, the river turns to the northeast. At 4.2 miles (6.8 km) from the mouth, it receives the East Fork of the South Fork Clackamas River from the right. Further downstream, Oscar Creek enters from the right, then Memaloose Creek from the right only 0.55 miles (0.89 km) from the mouth. Shortly thereafter the river plunges over the 70-foot (21 m) South Fork Clackamas River Falls (or South Fork Falls) before joining the Clackamas River at Big Cliff, about 35 miles (56 km) from the larger river's confluence with the Willamette River.

The 4.2 miles (6.8 km) of the South Fork Clackamas River between the East Fork of the South Fork and the mainstem Clackamas River were designated "wild" in the National Wild and Scenic Rivers System in 2009. Designated rivers are classified as either wild, scenic, or recreational depending on the degree of access and amount of nearby development.

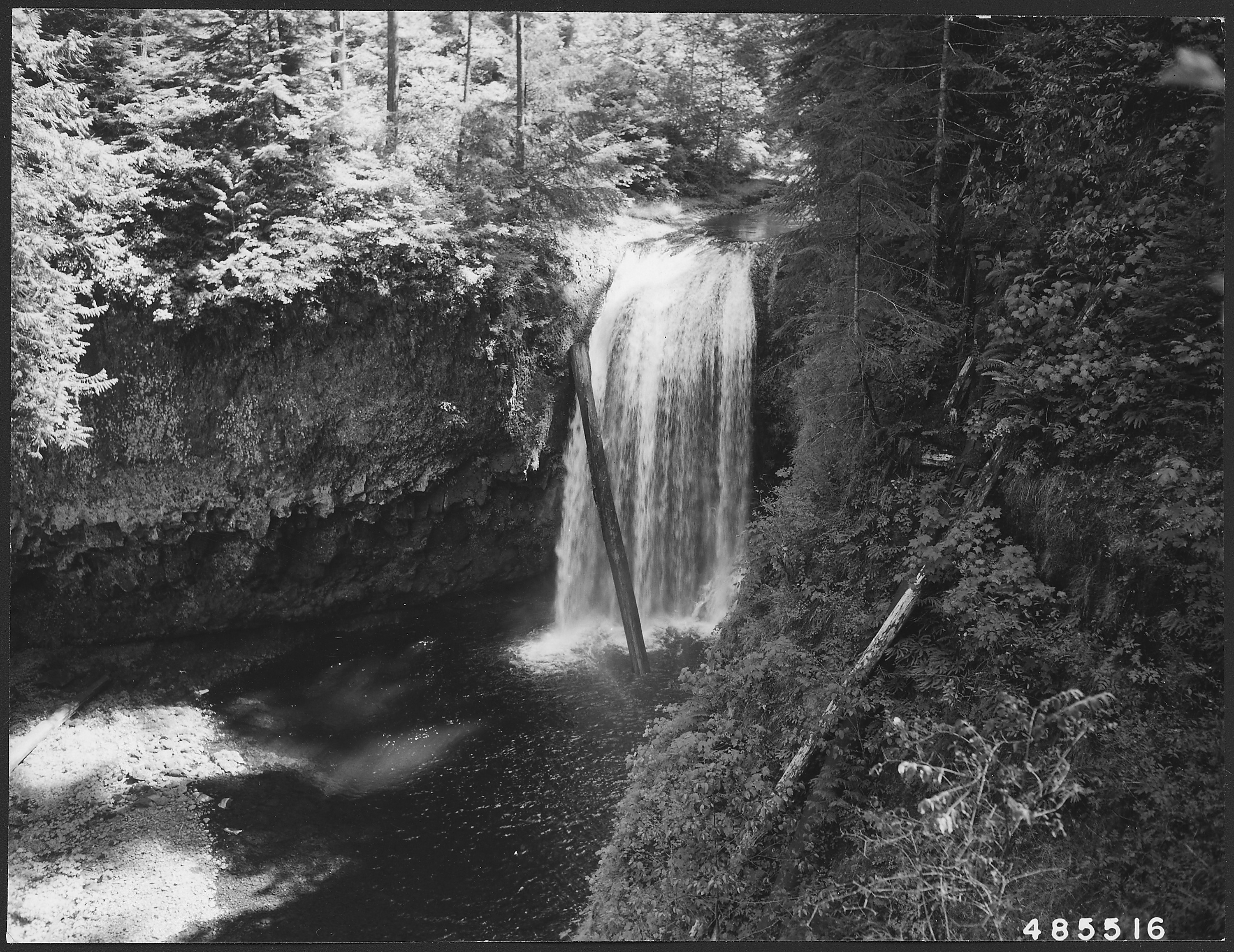
Lower South Fork Clackamas River Falls, Mount Hood National Forest, Oregon.

== Watershed ==
The South Fork Clackamas River basin covers 17,648 acres (71.42 km^{2}) or about 27.6 square miles (71.5 km^{2}) of rugged terrain, most of which lies within the Mount Hood National Forest. The Clackamas Ranger District of the U.S. Forest Service manages 79 percent of the land, the Bureau of Land Management 18 percent, while private owners control 3 percent. Elevations within the watershed vary from 4,852 feet (1.479 km) at South Fork Mountain to 676 feet (206 m) at the river mouth. Watersheds bordering the South Fork basin are Fish Creek to the southeast, tributaries of the Molalla River to the southwest, Clear Creek to the northwest, and the Clackamas River to the northeast.

== Recreation ==
A hiking guide calls the river "one of the most remote large streams in the state of Oregon". The Hillockburn Trail, which provides the only access to the lower river corridor, is 3.2 miles (5.1 km) round trip. It is usually open from mid-March to December, is moderately difficult, and has an elevation gain of 900 feet (270 m). It runs from Forest Road 45 west of the river to a campsite along the stream. Trail uses include hiking, mountain biking, backpacking, and access to catch-and-release fishing for trout. Vegetation along the trail consists mainly of Douglas-firs and Western hemlocks with an understory of salal, sword fern, and Oregon-grape.

A 70-foot (21 m) waterfall 0.4 miles (0.6 km) from the mouth prevents fish migration between the upper and lower river. Native winter steelhead, spring Chinook salmon, and Coho salmon frequent the river downstream of the barrier falls but are off-limits to anglers.

== See also ==
- List of rivers of Oregon

== Works cited ==
- Lorain, Douglas (2008. Afoot and Afield Portland/Vancouver: A Comprehensive Hiking Guide (2nd ed.). Berkeley, Calif: Wilderness Press. ISBN 978-0-89997-468-2.
- United States Forest Service (1997). "South Fork Clackamas River Watershed Analysis: Final Report". Retrieved February 28, 2010.
