= Collawash River =

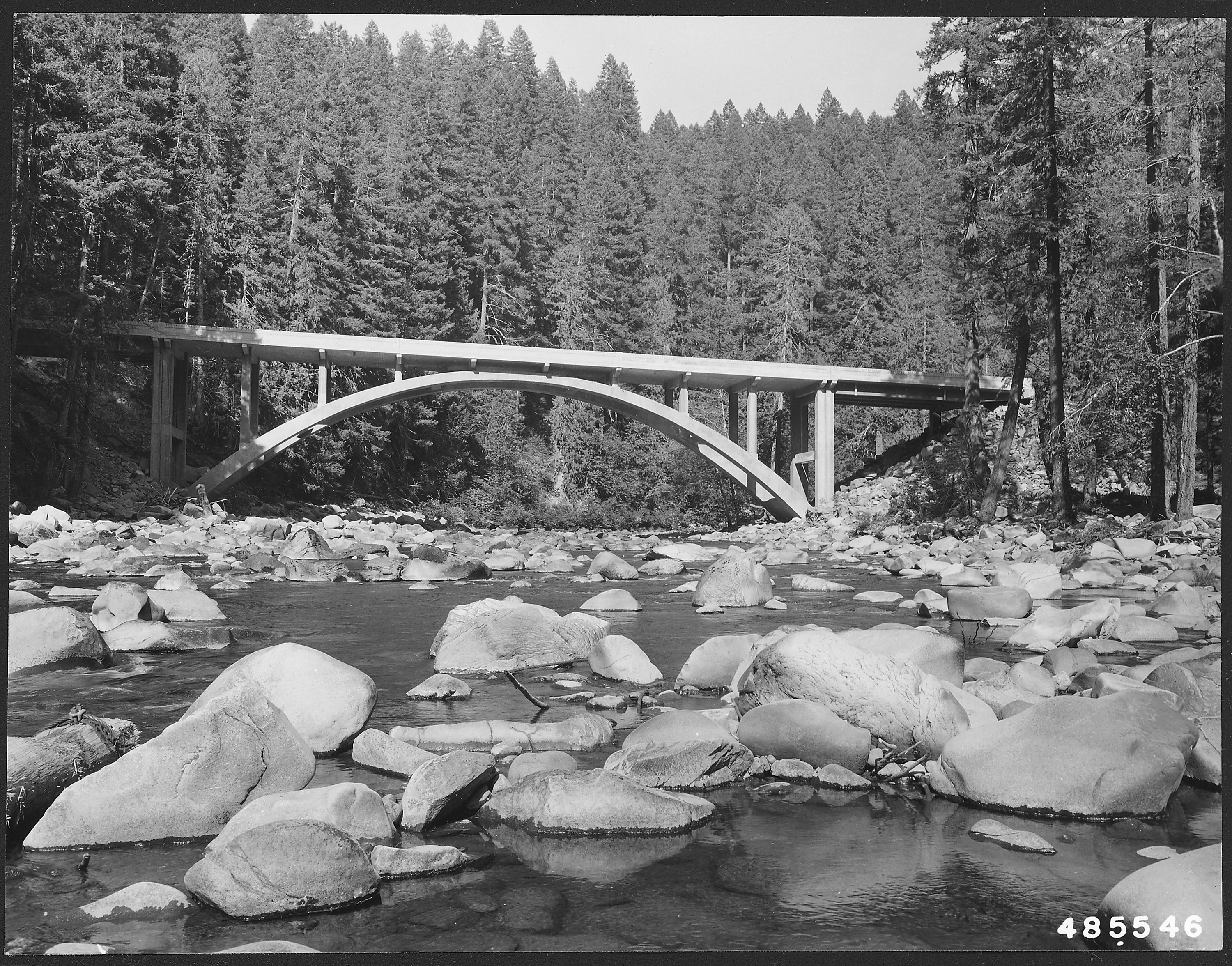
- A deck arch bridge over the river, pictured in 1957

- Location of the mouth of the Collawash River in Oregon
- Etymology: Perhaps for a Sahaptin leader whose name was sometimes written as Colwash

Location
- Country: United States
- State: Oregon
- County: Clackamas

Physical characteristics
- Source: Confluence of Elk Lake Creek and East Fork Collawash River
  - location: Cascade Range, Mount Hood National Forest, Clackamas County, Oregon
  - coordinates: 44°53′42″N 122°00′16″W
  - elevation: 2,312 ft (705 m)
- Mouth: Clackamas River
  - location: Mount Hood National Forest, Clackamas County, Oregon
  - coordinates: 45°01′52″N 122°03′41″W
  - elevation: 1,470 ft (450 m)
- Length: 12 mi (19 km)
- Basin size: 150 sq mi (390 km^{2})

National Wild and Scenic River
- Type: Scenic, Recreational
- Designated: March 30, 2009

The Collawash River is a 12-mile (19 km) tributary of the Clackamas River in the U.S. state of Oregon. Formed by the confluence of Elk Lake Creek and the East Fork Collawash River in the Cascade Range, it flows generally north-northwest from source to mouth through the Mount Hood National Forest. The largest tributary of the upper Clackamas, it provides about a third of bigger river's low-flow volume. About 35 percent of its watershed of 150 square miles (390 km^{2}) is protected as wilderness.

Fish habitat in the watershed is rated good to excellent. Catch-and-release fishing for trout is allowed on the main stem and the Hot Springs Fork tributary, but the streams are closed to fishing for salmon and steelhead. For whitewater runners, the river is considered as two or three sections which range from class II to class V on the International Scale of River Difficulty. Suggested flow range is 500 to 1,000 cubic feet per second (14 to 28 m^{3}/s).

== Course ==
Formed by the confluence of Elk Lake Creek and the East Fork Collawash River, the river loses about 840 feet (260 m) in elevation over the 12 miles (19 km) between source and mouth. Flowing generally to the north-northwest, the river receives Dunno Creek and Jazz Creek from the right bank, both near river mile (RM) 11 or river kilometer (RK 18), then Russ Creek and Blitzen Creek, both from the right. Happy Creek enters from the right at about RM 8 (RK 13), then Dickey Creek from the left bank, and Buckeye Creek from the right.

Peat Creek enters from the right at about RM 6 (RK 10) and Farm Creek from the left shortly thereafter. The river receives Paste Creek from the right before Hot Springs Fork enters from the left at RM 4.0 (RK 6.4). Over the last third of its course, the Collawash River receives Slide, Sluice, and Cap creeks, all from the right, passes the Raab Campground, then receives Jack Davis Creek from the left. Two Rivers Picnic Area is on the right near the confluence with the Clackamas River, 57 miles (92 km) from the larger river's confluence with the Willamette River.

== See also ==
- List of rivers of Oregon
