= Cazadero Dam =

Former dam in Oregon, United States

Coordinates: 45.252065°N 122.298417°W

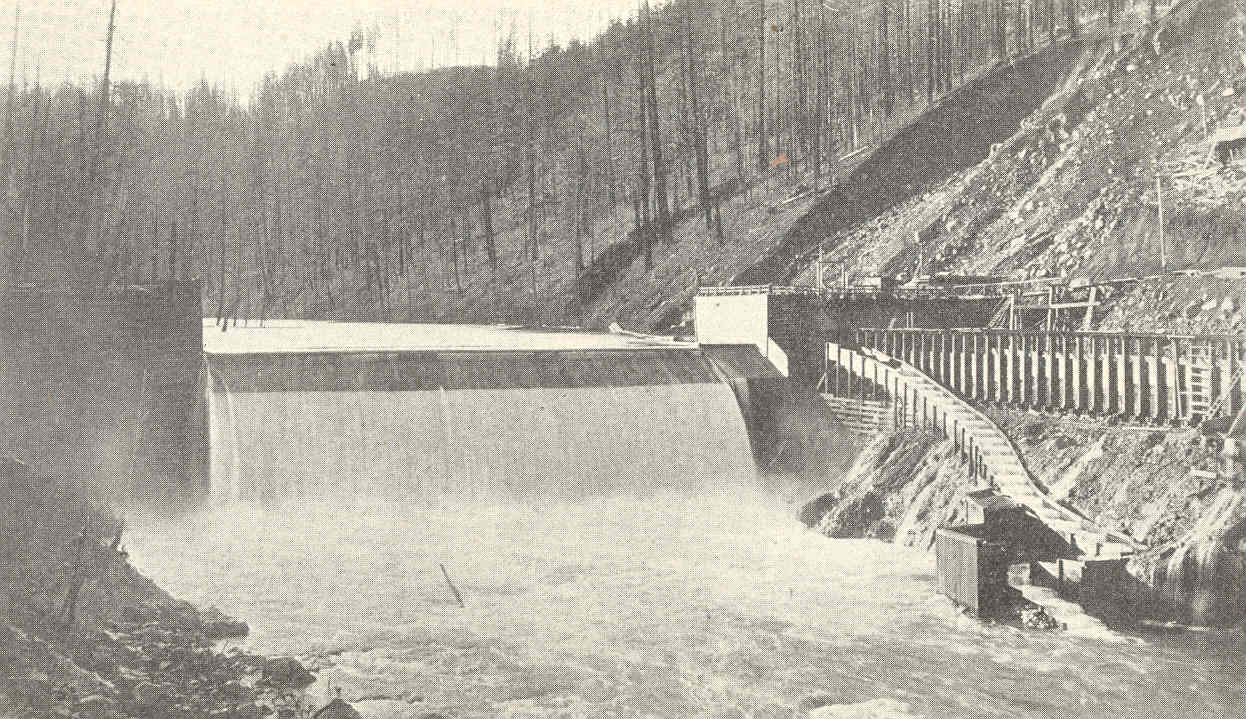
- Interactive map of Cazadero Dam
- Country: United States
- Location: Oregon
- Construction began: 1904
- Opening date: 1907

Cazadero Dam was a dam on the Clackamas River, near the city of Estacada, Oregon, United States. Construction began in 1904, and it was put into service in 1907.

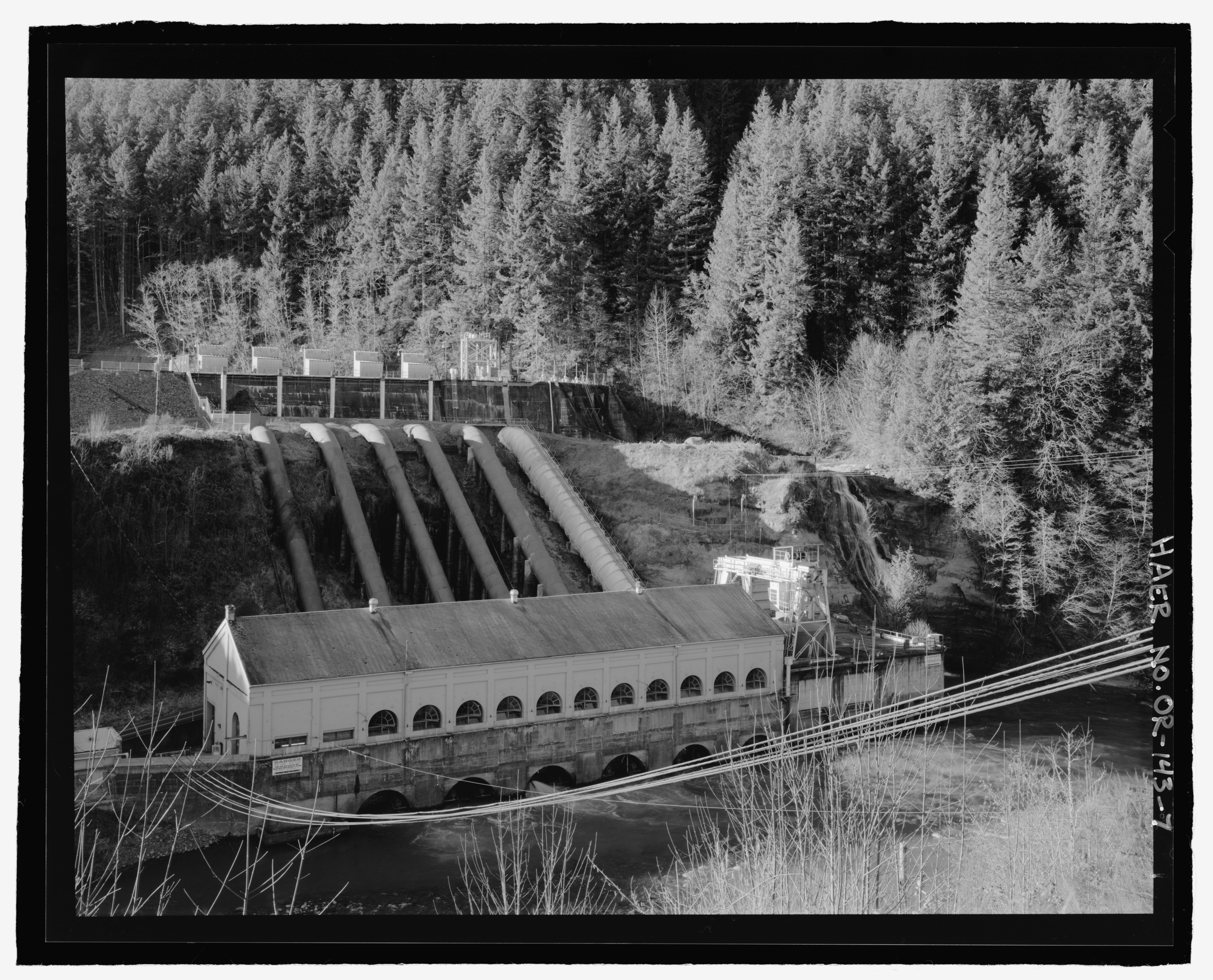
Perspective view of Cazadero Dam and generator building in 1996.

The original dam was destroyed by flooding in 1965 and replaced with the Faraday Dam. A new dam bears the name.

== See also ==
- Cazadero, Oregon, a former station and post office near the dam's powerhouse
