= Clackamas River =

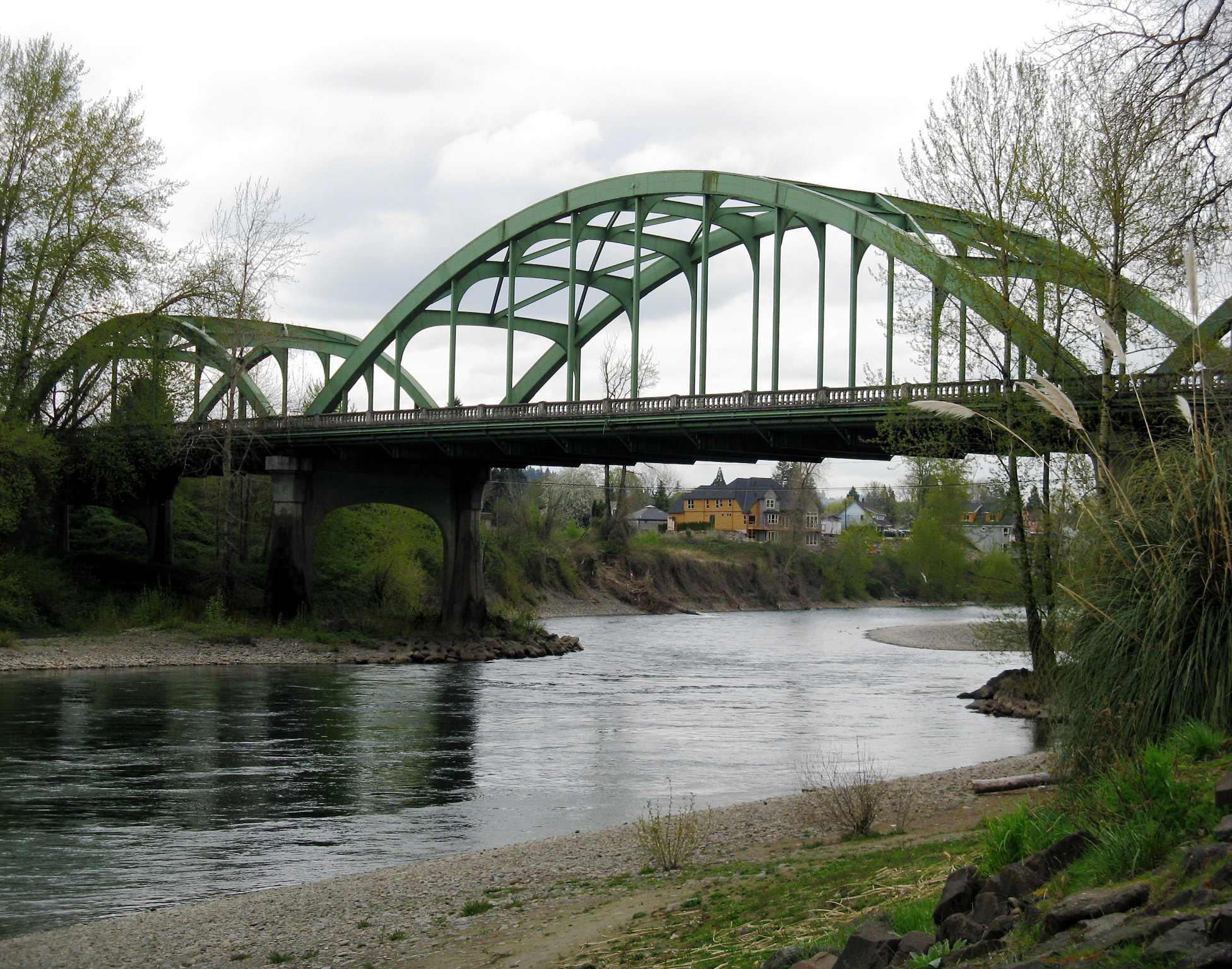
- Clackamas River Bridge at Oregon City

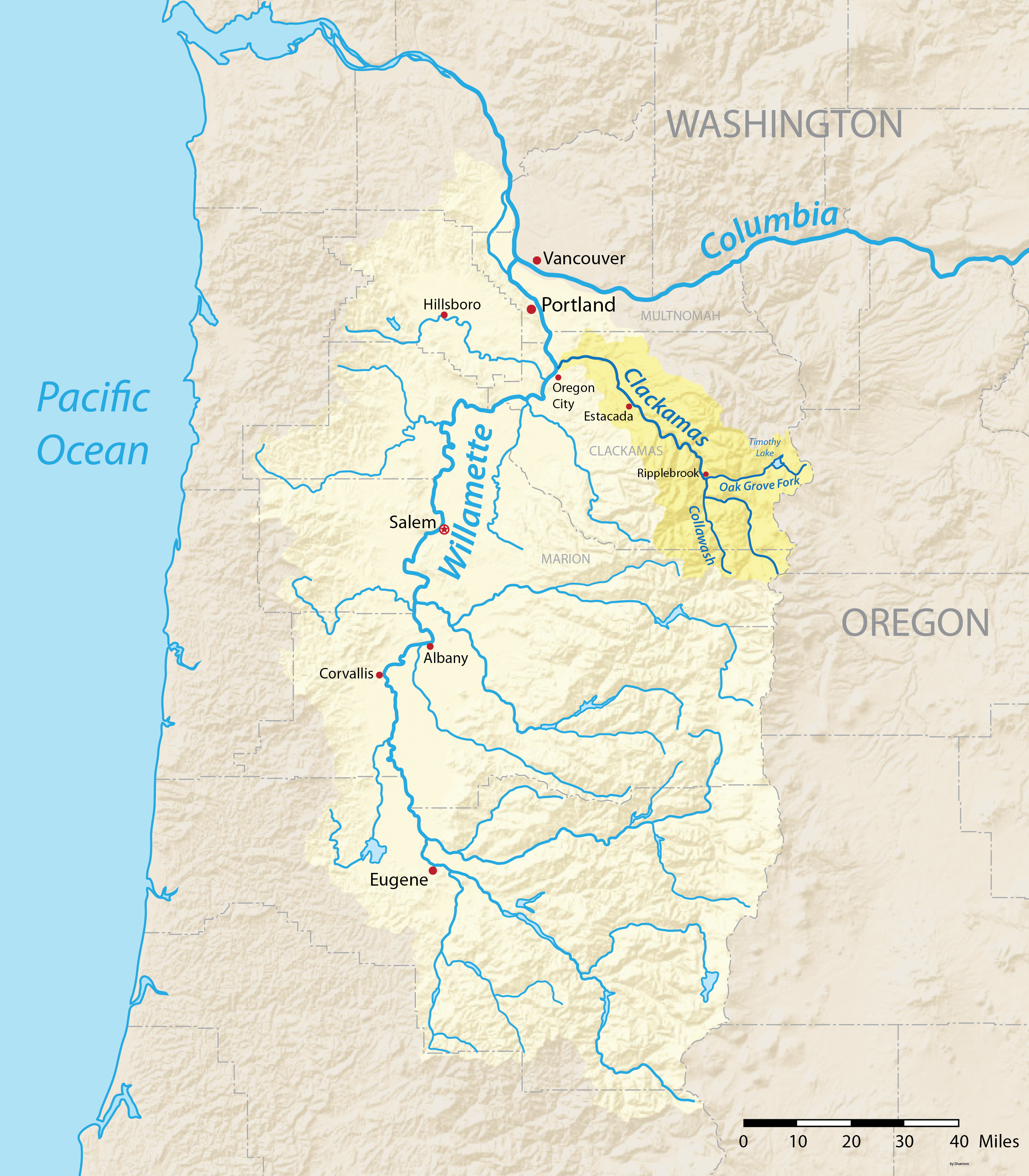
- Map showing the Clackamas River highlighted within the Willamette River watershed

- Location of the mouth of the Clackamas River in Oregon
- Etymology: Clackamas tribe

Location
- Country: United States
- State: Oregon
- Counties: Marion and Clackamas

Physical characteristics
- Source: near Olallie Butte
  - location: Cascade Range, Marion County, Oregon
  - coordinates: 44°49′17″N 121°47′47″W
  - elevation: 4,909 ft (1,496 m)
- Mouth: Willamette River
  - location: Oregon City and Gladstone, Clackamas County, Oregon
  - coordinates: 45°22′21″N 122°36′31″W
  - elevation: 10 ft (3.0 m)
- Length: 83 mi (134 km)
- Basin size: 940 sq mi (2,400 km^{2})
- Discharge
  - location: 1.5 miles (2.4 km) northwest of Estacada, 23.1 miles (37.2 km) from mouth
  - average: 2,750 cu ft/s (78 m^{3}/s)
  - minimum: 285 cu ft/s (8.1 m^{3}/s)
  - maximum: 86,900 cu ft/s (2,460 m^{3}/s)

National Wild and Scenic River
- Type: Scenic, Recreational
- Designated: October 28, 1988

The Clackamas River is an approximately 83-mile (134 km) tributary of the Willamette River in northwestern Oregon, in the United States. Draining an area of about 940 square miles (2,435 km^{2}), the Clackamas flows through mostly forested and rugged mountainous terrain in its upper reaches, and passes agricultural and urban areas in its lower third. The river rises in eastern Marion County, about 55 miles (89 km) east-southeast of Salem. The headwaters are on the slopes of Olallie Butte in the Mount Hood National Forest, about 10 miles (16 km) north of Mount Jefferson, at an elevation of 4,909 feet (1,496 m) in the Cascade Range. The Clackamas flows briefly north and then flows northwest through the mountains, passing through North Fork Reservoir and Estacada. It then emerges from the mountains southeast of Portland. It joins the Willamette near Oregon City and forms the boundary between Oregon City and Gladstone.

The Clackamas provides hydroelectric power and drinking water for some of the Portland metropolitan area, and it supports runs of Coho salmon, spring and fall Chinook salmon, and summer and winter steelhead. The river's old-growth forests, its habitat for several species of birds, its healthy fish runs, and the recreational opportunities that it provides—such as fishing and whitewater rafting—led to the designation of more than half of the length of the river into the National Wild and Scenic Rivers System (NWSRS). This environment also allowed Native Americans to settle in the river's basin as early as 10,000 years ago.

Regulation of the river began in 1905 with the Cazadero Dam. In 1912, the River Mill Dam intercepted wood and coarse sediment. Later dams at North Fork, Oak Grove, Stone Creek, and Timothy Lake also intercepted wood sediment on the lower river.

== Course ==
The Clackamas River arises on the western slopes of the Cascade Range near Olallie Butte, between Mount Hood and Mount Jefferson in the Mount Hood National Forest. Flowing generally northwest and then west for about 83 miles (134 km), it joins the Willamette River at Gladstone. The river falls nearly 4,900 feet (1,500 m) between its source and its mouth.

Originating in Marion County, the Clackamas River receives Squirrel Creek from the left bank and Lemiti Creek from the right bank before entering Clackamas County about 76 miles (122 km) from the mouth. Over its next 10 miles (16 km), much of which is in a relatively level stretch known as Big Bottom, the river receives Cub Creek from the left, Sisi Creek from the right, then Hunter, Fawn, Rhododendron, and Lowe creeks, all from the left, followed by Wall, Pinhead, and Campbell creeks, all from the right, Kansas Creek from the left, and Cabin Creek and Lost Creek, both from the right. About 61 miles (98 km) from the mouth, Granite Creek enters from the left, and the river flows by Austin Hot Springs and Picnic Area. Shortly thereafter, Switch Creek enters from the right, and at about 57 miles (92 km) from the mouth, the Clackamas receives the Collawash River from the left. At the confluence, Two Rivers Picnic Area is on the left and Riverford Campground is on the right. About 1 mile (1.6 km) further downstream, Trout Creek enters from the left, and Riverside Campground is on the right.

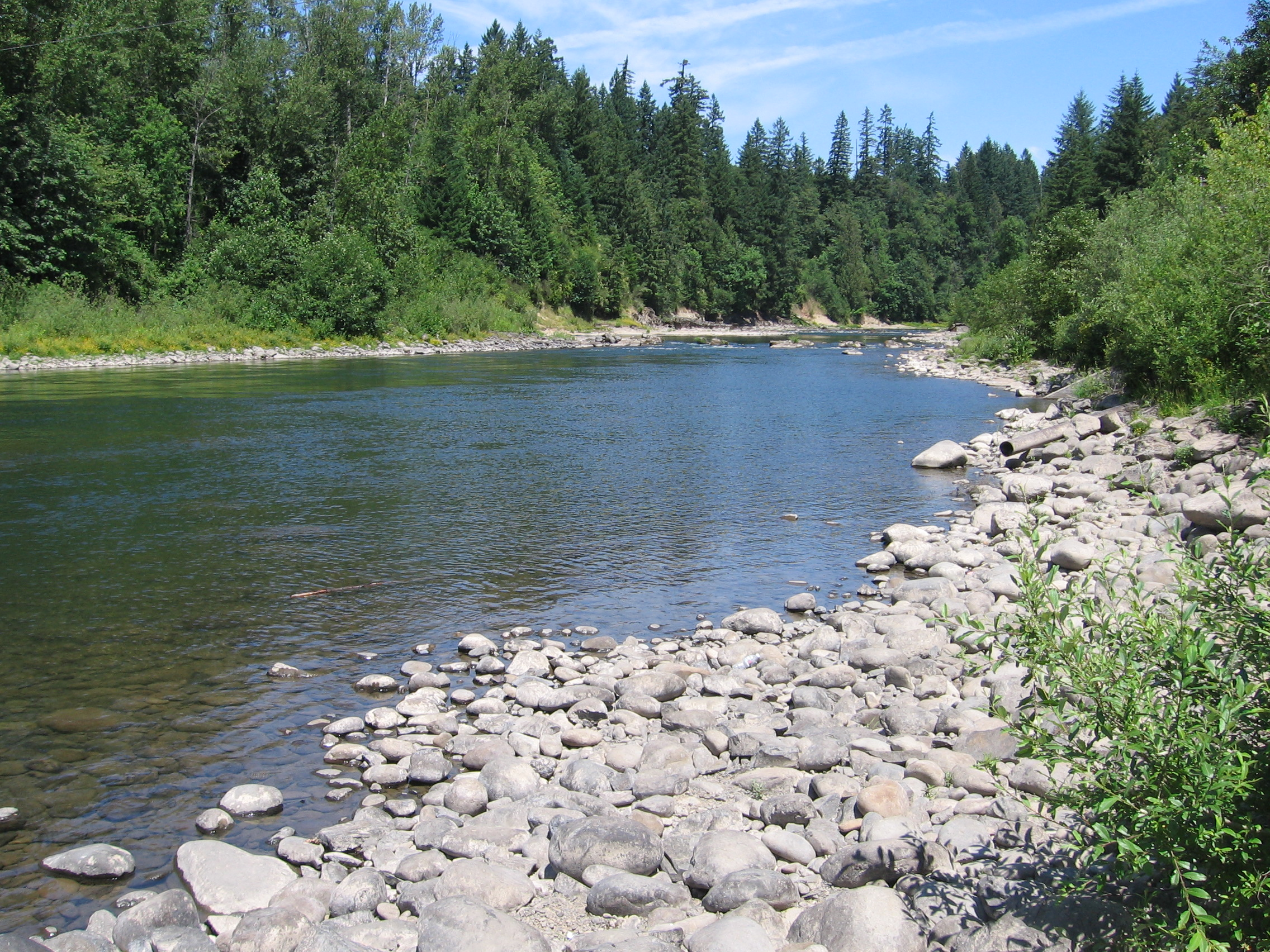
Clackamas River flowing through Milo McIver State Park

Shortly thereafter, Tag Creek enters from the right, and at about 53 miles (85 km) from the mouth, the Clackamas River receives Oak Grove Fork Clackamas River from the right. From its confluence with Oak Grove Fork, the river runs close to Oregon Route 224 for most of the rest of its course. The highway is initially north and east of the river; that is, to its right. Over the next few miles, the river receives Big Creek, Sandstone Creek, and Whale Creek, all from the left, passes under Route 224, receives Cripple Creek, and passes under Route 224 again at the unincorporated community of Three Lynx. It receives Three Lynx Creek and Deer Creek from the right, Cat Creek from the left, and then Dinner Creek from the right as it enters a chute known as The Narrows about 46 miles (74 km) from the mouth. Soon Pup Creek enters from the left opposite the Sunstrip Campground before Roaring River enters from the right at about 44 miles (71 km) from the mouth. Near this point, Roaring River Campground is on the right. Shortly thereafter, Murphy Creek enters from the right, and Fish Creek enters from the left about 42 miles (68 km) from the mouth.

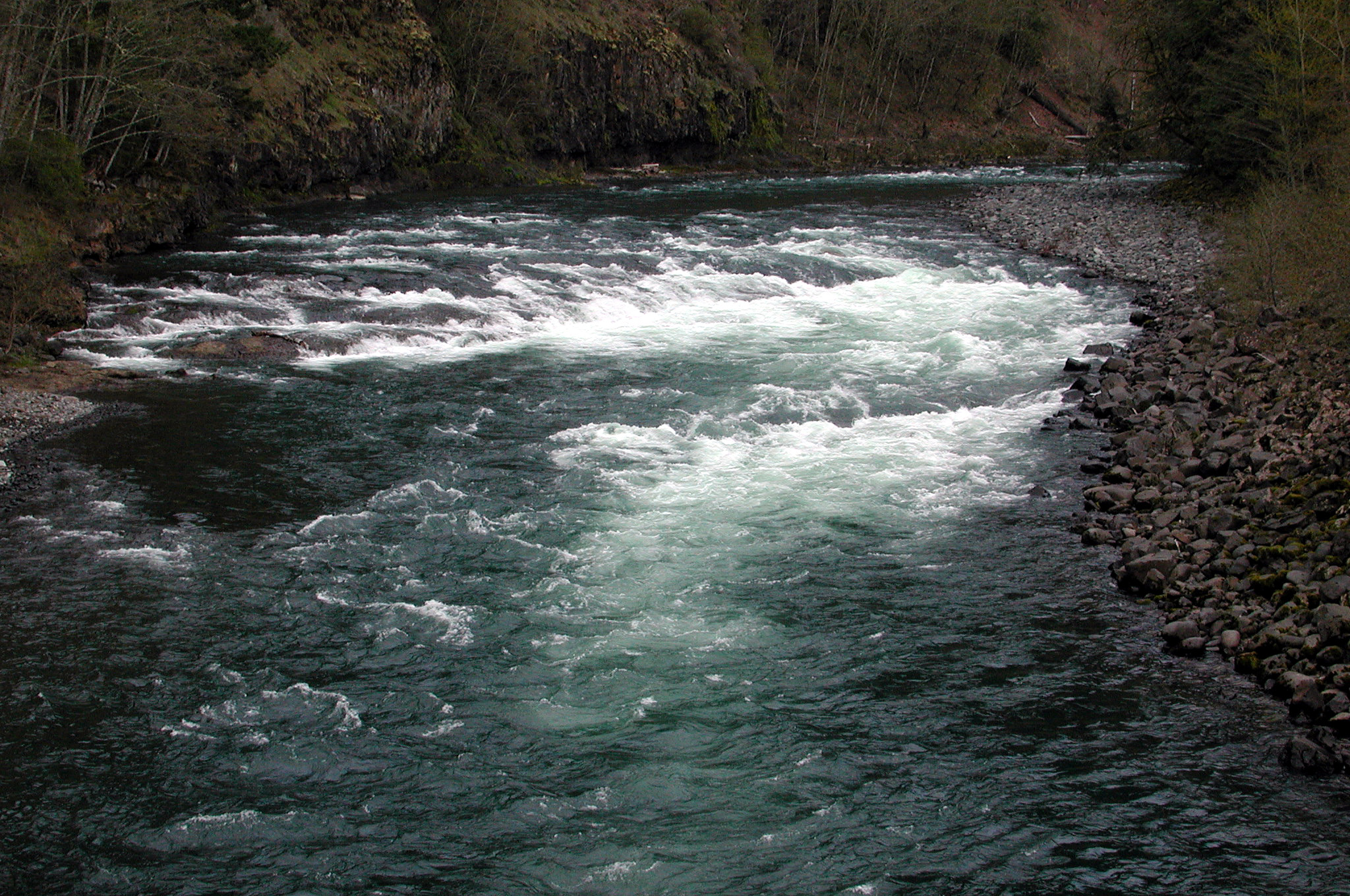
Whitewater on the Clackamas River as seen from Highway 224 at Carter Bridge

Over the next few miles, the river flows by Fish Creek Campground and Armstrong Campground, where it passes under Route 224. The river then passes Lockaby Campground and Carter Bridge Campground, where it passes under Route 224 again for the fourth and final time. From here to near Gladstone, the river flows south and west of the highway, which is on its right. Below Carter Bridge, the Clackamas River receives Hellion Creek from the left about 40 miles (64 km) from the mouth, passes Big Eddy Campground, receives Moore Creek from the right, and passes Lazy Bend Campground. Around 35 miles (56 km) from the mouth, the river receives the South Fork Clackamas River from the left opposite a landform known as Big Cliff. About 2 miles (3.2 km) later, the river enters North Fork Reservoir and soon receives the North Fork Clackamas River from the right. The Clackamas reaches the Faraday Dam, formerly known as the Cazadero Dam, about 28 miles (45 km) from the mouth and passes Faraday Lake, which is on the river's left about 2 miles (3.2 km) later. Shortly thereafter, the Clackamas receives Lingleback Creek from the right, passes under Oregon Route 211 at Estacada, receives Dubois Creek from the left, and reaches River Mill Dam. It flows by Milo McIver State Park, south of the river between 24 miles (39 km) and 20 miles (32 km) from its mouth.

The river then flows by Bonnie Lure State Recreation Area, which lies to the north, and receives Eagle Creek from the right about 17 miles (27 km) from the mouth. It receives Goose Creek from the right before passing Barton County Park, which lies north of the river about 3 miles (5 km) downstream of Bonnie Lure. Deep Creek then enters from the right, Foster Creek from the left, and Richardson Creek from the right before the Clackamas River reaches Carver 8 miles (13 km) from the mouth. Here it receives Clear Creek from the left. Thereafter, Rock Creek enters from the right and Johnson Creek (not the Johnson Creek a few miles north of this one that empties into the Willamette River) from the left before the river passes under Interstate 205 and then Oregon Route 99E (McLoughlin Boulevard) between Oregon City to the south and Gladstone to the north. Clackamette Park lies to the left of the river's last stretch as it enters the Willamette 25 miles (40 km) above its confluence with the Columbia River.

== History ==
=== Early inhabitants ===
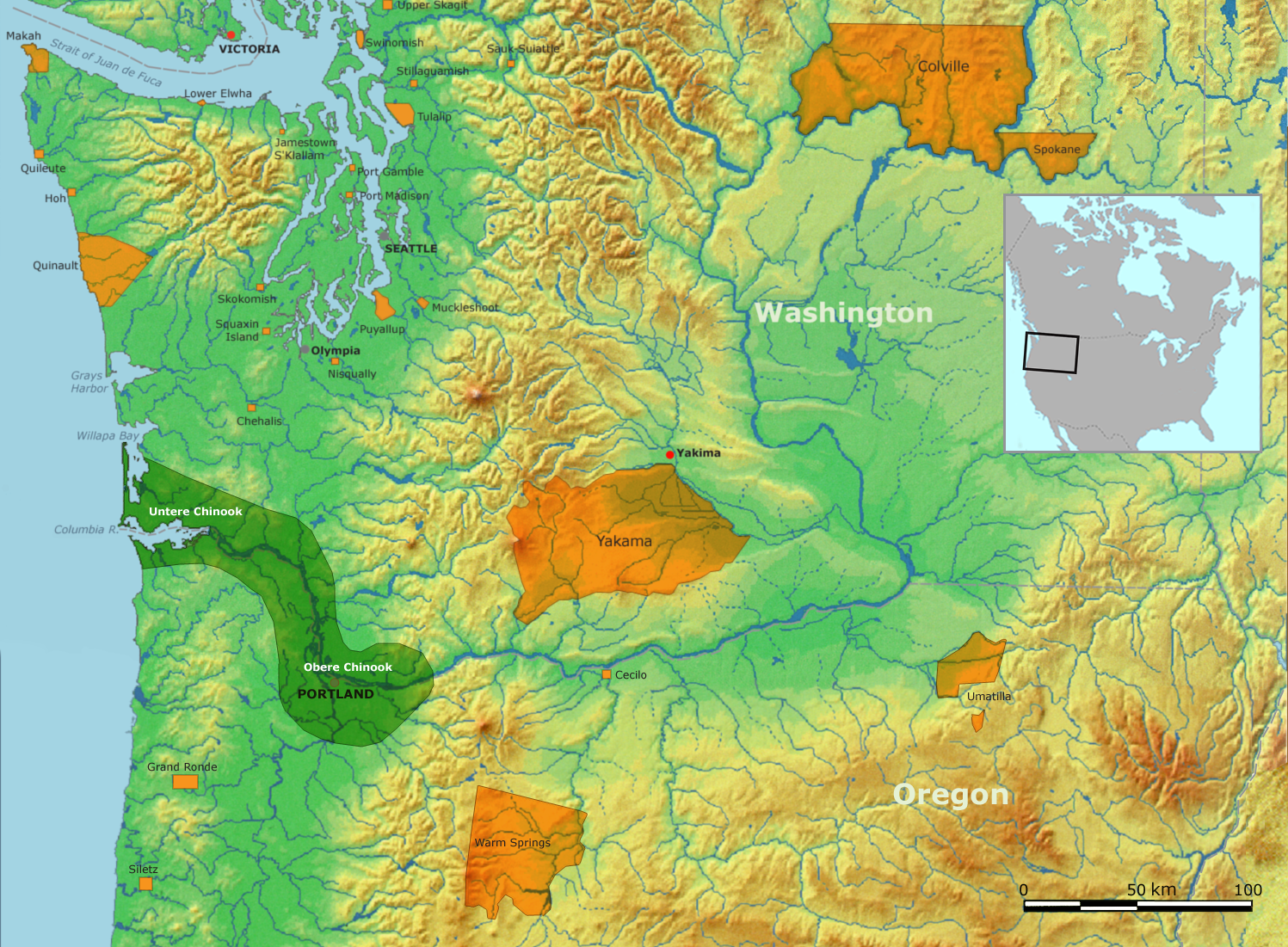
Traditional Chinook tribal territory is shown in dark green in the lower Columbia River basin, including the Clackamas River.

Before 1800, coniferous forests covered most of the watershed, and its streams supported big populations of salmon, steelhead, and other fish. Native Americans hunted, fished and gathered food and materials in the Clackamas River drainage as early as 10,000 years ago. By 2,000 to 3,000 years ago, they had established permanent settlements along the river's lower floodplain. This was home to the Clackamas tribe, a subgroup of the Chinookan speakers who lived in the Columbia River valley from Celilo Falls to the Pacific Ocean. The Clackamas lands, reaching into the Cascade Range foothills, included the lower Willamette River from Willamette Falls at what became Oregon City to the confluence with the Columbia.

When Lewis and Clark visited the area in 1806, the Clackamas tribe consisted of about 1,800 people living in 11 villages. Big villages lay near the falls and the mouth of the Clackamas River; others lay near Estacada and Eagle Creek. In the winter, families stayed in the villages, but at other times they used an extensive system of trails to visit seasonal camps. Epidemics of smallpox, malaria, and measles reduced the Clackamas population to 88 by 1851, and in 1855 the tribe surrendered its lands. Remnants of the tribe continued to travel from the Warm Springs Indian Reservation to fish and to gather berries near Estacada through the 1930s.

== Watershed ==
The river basin, made up of 16 subwatersheds, drains an area of about 940 square miles (2,400 km^{2}). Most of the upper half of the basin lies within the rugged Mount Hood National Forest, managed by the U.S. Forest Service, while most of the lower watershed, partly agricultural and more heavily populated, is privately owned. Private timber companies own some of the land between the national forest and the lower watershed, and some of it is public land managed by the Bureau of Land Management. Roughly 72 percent of the watershed is on public land; 25 percent is private, and 3 percent is owned by Native American tribes. The watershed's estimated population in 1995 was 63,702.

The Clackamas River supplies drinking water to more than 200,000 people. The City of Estacada, Clackamas River Water, the combined Oak Lodge Water District and Sunrise Water Authority, the South Fork Water Board, and the City of Lake Oswego all draw water from the Clackamas.

The Clackamas River Basin Council, with diverse representatives from over 20 stakeholder groups, fosters partnerships with organizations and private individuals to advocate natural resource conservation and preserve the watershed for future generations. Stakeholders include (but are not limited to) those involved in agriculture, education, fish and wildlife, hydropower, recreation, timber production, and government agencies.

The watershed is home to the last significant run of wild late-winter coho salmon in the Columbia Basin, which generally spawn on the main stem of the Clackamas above the North Fork Reservoir. The watershed also has one of only two remaining runs of spring chinook in the Willamette basin and supports a significant population of winter steelhead, cutthroat trout, and native lamprey.

== Wild and Scenic designation ==
Forty-seven miles (76 km) of the Clackamas River, from Big Springs to Big Cliff, are federally protected as part of the NWSRS. Of these, 20 miles (32 km) are designated as "scenic" and 27 miles (43 km) as "recreational". The protected portion of the Clackamas features five categories of resources that are considered to be "outstandingly remarkable", defined by the NWSRS as having "importance to the region or nation".

The five are opportunities for recreation such as white water rafting near the Portland metropolitan area; anadromous fish habitat supporting wild late winter coho, spring chinook, and winter steelhead; habitat for the federally threatened bald eagle and northern spotted owl; potential habitat for the threatened peregrine falcon; the forests of old-growth Douglas-fir along its banks; and historic importance. All 13.5 miles (21.7 km) of a tributary, the Roaring River, are designated as Wild and Scenic and are within the Roaring River Wilderness. Another 4.2 miles (6.8 km) of the South Fork Clackamas River were designated as Wild and Scenic along with the creation of the Clackamas Wilderness in 2009.

== Pollution ==
In March 2008, the United States Geological Survey (USGS) released a report entitled "Pesticide Occurrence and Distribution in the Lower Clackamas River Basin, Oregon, 2000–2005." It details pesticide pollution in the lower Clackamas River, its tributaries, and in pre- and post-treatment drinking water.

In all, 63 pesticide compounds: 33 herbicides, 15 insecticides, 6 fungicides, and 9 pesticide degradates were detected in samples collected during storm and nonstorm conditions. Fifty-seven pesticides or degradates were detected in the tributaries (mostly during storms), whereas fewer compounds (26) were detected in samples of source water from the lower mainstem Clackamas River, with fewest (15) occurring in drinking water.

The study concluded, "Given their frequent and widespread occurrence, especially during storms, pesticides have the potential to affect aquatic life and the quality of drinking water derived from the lower river," and laid out areas for further study.

== See also ==
- Clackamas (disambiguation)
- List of rivers of Oregon
- List of longest streams of Oregon
- List of National Wild and Scenic Rivers
