= Estacada, Oregon =

City in Oregon, US

- City
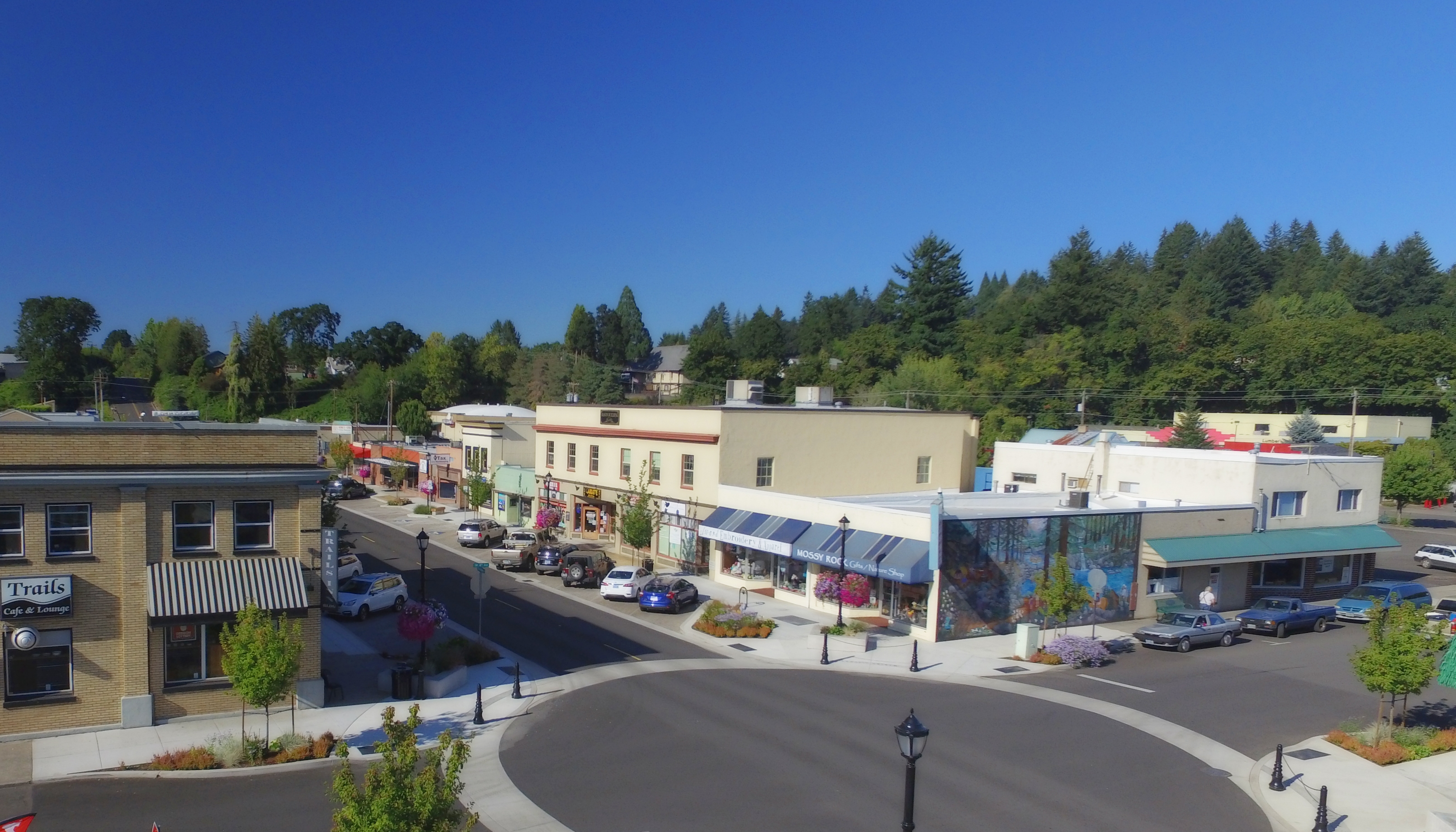
- Downtown Estacada
- Motto: Unexpected, Untamed, Unforgettable
- Location of Estacada, Oregon
- Coordinates: 45°17′59.77″N 122°20′1.72″W
- Country: United States
- State: Oregon
- County: Clackamas
- Established: 1903
- Incorporated: 1905

Government
  - Mayor: Sean Drinkwine
  - Councilmembers: Matthew Blevens; Jon Dolezal; Michael McElroy; Jerry Tenbush; Melissa Hill
  - Council President: Jonathan Metcalf

Area
  - Total: 2.705 sq mi (7.006 km^{2})
  - Land: 2.651 sq mi (6.867 km^{2})
  - Water: 0.053 sq mi (0.138 km^{2})
- Elevation: 499 ft (152 m)

Population (2020)
  - Total: 4,356
  - Estimate (2023): 5,421
  - Density: 2,110.3/sq mi (814.79/km^{2})
- Time zone: UTC–8 (Pacific (PST))
  - Summer (DST): UTC–7 (PDT)
- ZIP Code: 97023
- Area codes: 503 and 971
- FIPS code: 41-23800
- GNIS feature ID: 2410457
- Website: www.cityofestacada.org/f

Estacada /ˌɛstəˈkeɪdə/ is a city in Clackamas County, Oregon, United States, about 30 miles (48 km) southeast of Portland. The population was 4,356 at the 2020 census, and was estimated to be 5,421 in 2023.

== History ==
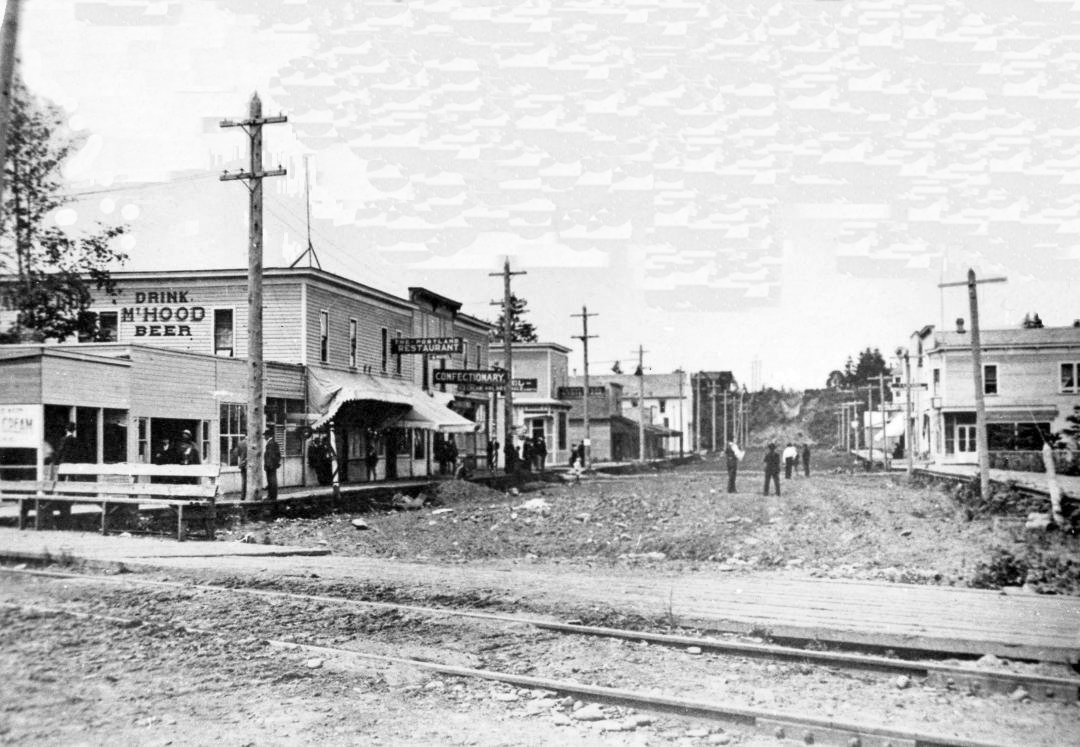
Broadway in Estacada, c. 1915

The Estacada post office opened on February 24, 1904, and the city was incorporated in May 1905. The community formed as a camp for workers building a hydroelectric dam on the nearby Clackamas River that was to supply Portland with electricity. At the time, the river was relatively inaccessible by road, forcing the Oregon Power Railway Company to build a railway to the vicinity of the river to transport crews to the river for the construction of the dam. After the construction of the Hotel Estacada, the town became a weekend destination on the railroad line for residents of Portland. During the week, the train carried freight and work crews to and from Portland. Following the development of the dams, the city became a hub for the logging industry. In the early 20th century, an interurban (trolley) line connected the town with downtown Portland. The railway line has been removed and there is no longer rail service to Estacada.

=== Name ===
The origin of the city's name is disputed. One explanation is that the city's name is a corruption of the names of a civic leader's daughters, Esther and Katie; however, there is no evidence of their existence. Another theory states that:

Estacado is a Spanish word and it means "staked out" or "marked with stakes." It was first suggested by George Kelly as a name for the town site at a meeting of the Oregon Water Power Townsite Company directors on December 27, 1903. Kelly had selected the name at random from a U.S. map showing Llano Estacado in Texas. If Kelly's suggestion had not been drawn from the hat, the town could have been named Rochester, Lowell or Lynn. The name Estacada is also used in Arizona.

== Geography ==
According to the United States Census Bureau, the city has a total area of 2.06 square miles (5.34 km^{2}), of which 2.01 square miles (5.21 km^{2}) is land and 0.05 square miles (0.13 km^{2}) is water.

Outside the city limits the land is mainly farmland, extending from the Springwater area to the south, Eagle Creek to the west, and the Mount Hood National Forest to the north and east.

=== Climate ===
Estacada has a warm-summer Mediterranean climate (Köppen: Csb).

Climate data for Estacada, Oregon (1991–2020 normals, extremes 1909-present)
Month	Jan	Feb	Mar	Apr	May	Jun	Jul	Aug	Sep	Oct	Nov	Dec	Year
Record high °F (°C)	67 (19)	72 (22)	86 (30)	94 (34)	105 (41)	117 (47)	109 (43)	105 (41)	105 (41)	92 (33)	77 (25)	68 (20)	117 (47)
Mean maximum °F (°C)	60.3 (15.7)	63.5 (17.5)	71.0 (21.7)	79.0 (26.1)	87.0 (30.6)	90.9 (32.7)	96.5 (35.8)	96.6 (35.9)	91.8 (33.2)	79.1 (26.2)	64.8 (18.2)	60.3 (15.7)	100.7 (38.2)
Mean daily maximum °F (°C)	49.2 (9.6)	52.6 (11.4)	57.0 (13.9)	61.8 (16.6)	68.6 (20.3)	73.3 (22.9)	81.6 (27.6)	82.5 (28.1)	76.8 (24.9)	64.7 (18.2)	54.4 (12.4)	48.3 (9.1)	64.2 (17.9)
Daily mean °F (°C)	42.1 (5.6)	44.2 (6.8)	47.5 (8.6)	51.5 (10.8)	57.4 (14.1)	62.0 (16.7)	68.0 (20.0)	68.3 (20.2)	63.5 (17.5)	54.7 (12.6)	46.7 (8.2)	41.5 (5.3)	54.0 (12.2)
Mean daily minimum °F (°C)	35.0 (1.7)	35.8 (2.1)	38.1 (3.4)	41.2 (5.1)	46.3 (7.9)	50.7 (10.4)	54.3 (12.4)	54.2 (12.3)	50.3 (10.2)	44.6 (7.0)	39.1 (3.9)	34.8 (1.6)	43.7 (6.5)
Mean minimum °F (°C)	25.4 (−3.7)	26.6 (−3.0)	29.3 (−1.5)	32.7 (0.4)	36.7 (2.6)	42.9 (6.1)	46.9 (8.3)	46.7 (8.2)	41.9 (5.5)	33.9 (1.1)	28.5 (−1.9)	24.5 (−4.2)	20.7 (−6.3)
Record low °F (°C)	−2 (−19)	0 (−18)	21 (−6)	26 (−3)	29 (−2)	32 (0)	36 (2)	37 (3)	30 (−1)	22 (−6)	8 (−13)	−2 (−19)	−2 (−19)
Average precipitation inches (mm)	7.52 (191)	5.93 (151)	6.88 (175)	5.45 (138)	3.87 (98)	2.58 (66)	0.64 (16)	0.76 (19)	2.15 (55)	5.51 (140)	8.10 (206)	8.38 (213)	57.77 (1,468)
Average snowfall inches (cm)	0.6 (1.5)	0.4 (1.0)	0.1 (0.25)	0.0 (0.0)	0.0 (0.0)	0.0 (0.0)	0.0 (0.0)	0.0 (0.0)	0.0 (0.0)	0.0 (0.0)	0.0 (0.0)	0.0 (0.0)	1.1 (2.75)
Average precipitation days (≥ 0.01 in)	20.2	17.9	20.2	19.0	14.9	11.3	4.8	3.7	8.7	15.2	19.8	21.3	177.0
Average snowy days (≥ 0.1 in)	0.2	0.2	0.0	0.0	0.0	0.0	0.0	0.0	0.0	0.0	0.0	0.1	0.5
Source: NOAA

== Demographics ==
Historical population
Census	Pop.	Note	%±
1910	405		—
1920	483		19.3%
1930	524		8.5%
1940	526		0.4%
1950	950		80.6%
1960	957		0.7%
1970	1,164		21.6%
1980	1,419		21.9%
1990	2,016		42.1%
2000	2,371		17.6%
2010	2,695		13.7%
2020	4,356		61.6%
2023 (est.)	5,421		24.4%
U.S. Decennial Census; 2020 Census

=== 2020 census ===
As of the 2020 census, Estacada had a population of 4,356. The median age was 34.9 years. 25.4% of residents were under the age of 18 and 12.5% of residents were 65 years of age or older. For every 100 females there were 100.6 males, and for every 100 females age 18 and over there were 98.4 males age 18 and over.

98.9% of residents lived in urban areas, while 1.1% lived in rural areas.

There were 1,583 households in Estacada, of which 36.4% had children under the age of 18 living in them. Of all households, 50.9% were married-couple households, 17.1% were households with a male householder and no spouse or partner present, and 22.0% were households with a female householder and no spouse or partner present. About 23.9% of all households were made up of individuals and 11.6% had someone living alone who was 65 years of age or older.

There were 1,658 housing units, of which 4.5% were vacant. Among occupied housing units, 72.6% were owner-occupied and 27.4% were renter-occupied. The homeowner vacancy rate was 1.1% and the rental vacancy rate was 2.7%.

Racial composition as of the 2020 census
Race	Number	Percent
White	3,720	85.4%
Black or African American	40	0.9%
American Indian and Alaska Native	58	1.3%
Asian	73	1.7%
Native Hawaiian and Other Pacific Islander	8	0.2%
Some other race	89	2.0%
Two or more races	368	8.4%
Hispanic or Latino (of any race)	358	8.2%

=== 2010 census ===
As of the census of 2010, there were 2,695 people, 1,062 households, and 672 families residing in the city. The population density was 1,340.8 inhabitants per square mile (517.7/km^{2}). There were 1,155 housing units at an average density of 574.6 per square mile (221.9/km^{2}). The racial makeup of the city was 92.0% White, 0.8% African American, 0.7% Native American, 1.2% Asian, 0.2% Pacific Islander, 2.7% from other races, and 2.4% from two or more races. Hispanic or Latino of any race were 7.5% of the population.

There were 1,062 households, of which 35.1% had children under the age of 18 living with them, 43.8% were married couples living together, 14.0% had a female householder with no husband present, 5.5% had a male householder with no wife present, and 36.7% were non-families. 30.4% of all households were made up of individuals, and 15.1% had someone living alone who was 65 years of age or older. The average household size was 2.53 and the average family size was 3.16.

The median age in the city was 35.7 years. 26.8% of residents were under the age of 18; 8.3% were between the ages of 18 and 24; 27.2% were from 25 to 44; 24.6% were from 45 to 64; and 12.9% were 65 years of age or older. The gender makeup of the city was 49.8% male and 50.2% female.

=== 2000 census ===
As of the census of 2000, there were 2,371 people, 850 households, and 591 families residing in the city. The population density was 2,259.6 inhabitants per square mile (872.4/km^{2}). There were 886 housing units at an average density of 844.4 per square mile (326.0/km^{2}). The racial makeup of the city was 84.86% White, 0.17% African American, 1.43% Native American, 1.77% Asian, 0.04% Pacific Islander, 9.91% from other races, and 1.81% from two or more races. Hispanic or Latino of any race were 12.78% of the population.

There were 850 households, out of which 39.9% had children under the age of 18 living with them, 50.9% were married couples living together, 13.1% had a female householder with no husband present, and 30.4% were non-families. 26.2% of all households were made up of individuals, and 13.9% had someone living alone who was 65 years of age or older. The average household size was 2.78 and the average family size was 3.26.

In the city, the population was spread out, with 29.6% under the age of 18, 10.5% from 18 to 24, 28.5% from 25 to 44, 20.5% from 45 to 64, and 11.1% who were 65 years of age or older. The median age was 33 years. For every 100 females, there were 93.2 males. For every 100 females age 18 and over, there were 90.9 males.

The median income for a household in the city was $39,200, and the median income for a family was $46,445. Males had a median income of $37,269 versus $22,267 for females. The per capita income for the city was $17,049. About 10.1% of families and 12.9% of the population were below the poverty line, including 15.8% of those under age 18 and 5.9% of those age 65 or over.

== Economy ==
After the building of the dams, the primary base for Estacada's economy has been lumber. As the timber industry declined, the economy of the city has been depressed.

== Arts and culture ==
The Estacada Public Library is part of the Library Information Network of Clackamas County.

Estacada is located near a popular disc golf course at Milo McIver State Park and boasts its own disc golf courses at Timber Park and Metzler Park.

== Government ==
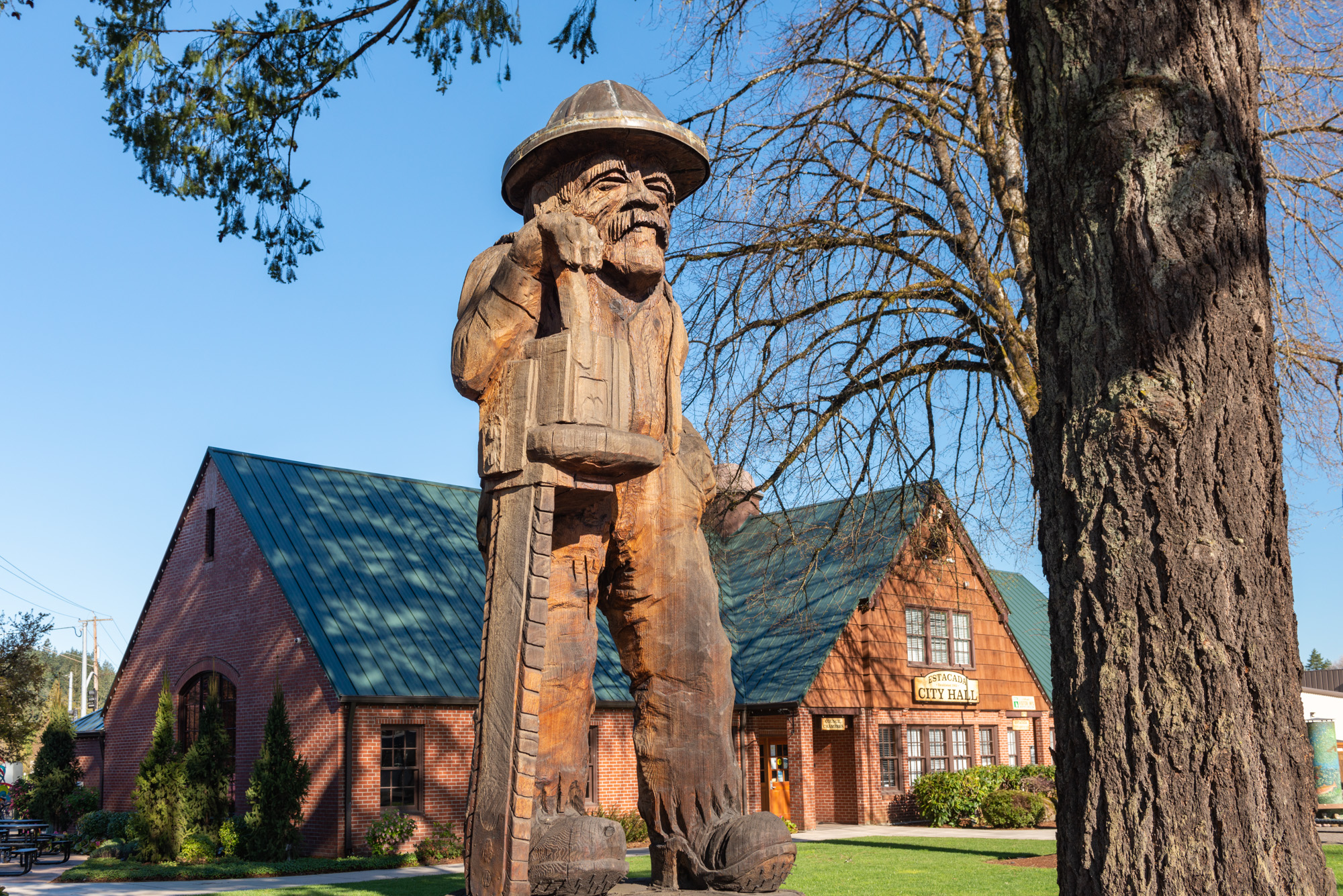
Estacada City Hall

On June 22, 2020, Estacada Mayor Sean Drinkwine became the subject of statewide controversy after making an inflammatory Facebook post about the George Floyd protests, in which he vowed to "shut those vigils down" following a peaceful protest of nearly 50 residents outside of Estacada City Hall. Drinkwine was re-elected in November 2020 with over 1,500 votes. He is still serving as Mayor of Estacada today.

== Education ==
Estacada is served by the Estacada School District, which includes River Mill Elementary School, Clackamas River Elementary School, Estacada Middle School, and Estacada High School, which are all located within Estacada's city limits.

== Media ==
The Estacada News is a weekly newspaper owned and operated by the Pamplin Media Group.

== Infrastructure ==
=== Transportation ===
==== Air ====
- Valley View Airport

==== Bus ====
TriMet's route 30 connects the city with Clackamas Town Center mall and the Clackamas Town Center Transit Center, which is a stop on the MAX Green Line light rail line. The route's terminus is at Estacada City Hall. Sandy Area Metro extends bus service from City Hall to Sandy on weekdays, with connections to Gresham, connecting with TriMet lines and MAX light rail there.

TriMet has been serving Estacada since 1970, when it took over a private bus company named Estacada–Molalla Stages, which had served the area since at least the 1940s. Passenger interurban service connecting Estacada to Portland operated from 1904 to 1932, on a 36-mile-long (58 km) line that continued beyond Estacada to Cazadero.
