= Cascade Lakes =

Collection of lakes in Oregon, United States

Coordinates: 43.9°N 121.8°W

The Cascade Lakes are a collection of lakes in central Oregon in the United States. The 12 lakes and two reservoirs are found along the Deschutes river, east side of the Cascade Range in Deschutes County, Oregon. The lakes begin west of Mount Bachelor, just beyond the Mount Bachelor ski area. The first lake in the chain is Todd Lake. Heading west and south, Todd Lake is followed by Sparks Lake, Devils Lake, Elk Lake, Hosmer Lake, Lava Lake, Little Lava Lake, Cultus Lake and Little Cultus Lake. At the south end of the chain are Crane Prairie Reservoir, North and South Twin Lakes, Wickiup Reservoir, and Davis Lake.

== Accessibility ==
The Cascade Lakes are accessed via the Cascade Lakes Scenic Byway (also known as Century Drive and Forest Service Road 46). The byway is closed in the winter due to snow accumulation.

There are over 150 lakes on the Deschutes National Forest. Most are small upper elevation lakes of varying sizes, accessed via the many miles of trails.

== Tourist activities ==
Tourist activities in the area include:

- fishing
- hiking into the Three Sisters Wilderness along the many trails in the Deschutes National Forest
- staying at any of the rustic resorts along the route
- snowmobile riding on the Cascade Lakes Highway during winter when the road is closed

== See also ==
- List of lakes in Oregon
