= Davis Lake (disambiguation) =

Davis Lake is a lake in Deschutes and Klamath counties, Oregon, U.S.

Davis Lake may also refer to:

- Davis Lake (British Columbia), a lake in the Boundary Country near Greenwood
- Davis Lake Provincial Park, a park in British Columbia near the town of Mission
- Davis Lake in Faulkner County, Arkansas
- Davis Lake in Howard County, Arkansas
- Davis Lake in Lonoke County, Arkansas
- Davis Lake in Miller County, Arkansas
- Davis Lake in Ouachita County, Arkansas
- Davis Lake in Pulaski County, Arkansas
- Davis Lake in Stone County, Arkansas
- Davis Lakes, a lake in Utah
- Davis Lake Community, a residential neighborhood in Charlotte, North Carolina.

== See also ==
- Davis Lake volcanic field in Oregon
- Elmer Davis Lake in Kentucky
- Lake Davis (disambiguation)
