= Lava Lake murders =

1924 unsolved killings in Oregon, US

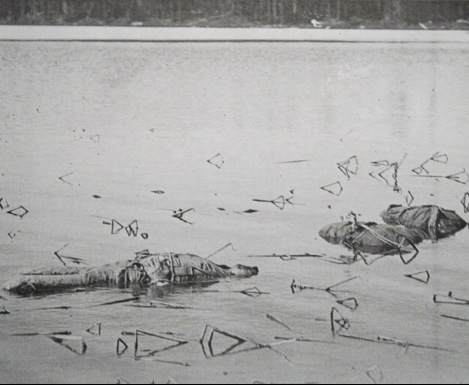
- Bodies discovered in Lava Lake, April 1924
- Date: c. January 16–22, 1924
- Location: Deschutes National Forest, Deschutes County, Oregon, U.S.
- Type: Murder
- Outcome: Unsolved
- Deaths: Edward Nickols (50); Roy Wilson (35); Dewey Morris (25)

The Lava Lake murders refers to a triple murder that occurred near Little Lava Lake in the Deschutes National Forest in Deschutes County, Oregon, United States, in January 1924. The victims were Edward Nickols (50), Roy Wilson (35), and Dewey Morris (25), all of whom were working as fur trappers in the Deschutes National Forest in the winter of 1923–1924. Their bodies were discovered in Little Lava Lake in April 1924, where they had been deposited under the surface ice. Each of the men had been murdered via gunshot and blunt force trauma. Though police identified a potential suspect, Charles Kimzey, no one was ever convicted of the crime.

The crime is one of the oldest unsolved murder cases in Oregon history, and was the subject of a 2013 investigative book titled The Trapper Murders by Melany Tupper.

== Background ==
Edward Nickols, Roy Wilson, and Dewey Morris, residents of Bend, Oregon, had made plans to spend the winter of 1923–1924 in a log cabin owned by a local logging contractor, Edward Logan, to work as fur trappers in the wilderness. The men moved into the cabin in the fall of 1923. The week before Christmas, Nickols visited Bend, reportedly in a "jovial" mood, and sold a sled full of expensive furs. He told locals that the fur trapping had been going well.

After Christmas, Allen Wilcoxen, a resort owner, was traveling by snowshoe from his home in Fall River to his resort at Elk Lake; en route, he stopped at Logan's cabin to visit the three men. Wilcoxen arrived on January 15, 1924, and spent the evening there; according to Wilcoxen, Nickols, Wilson and Morris were in good spirits and had been successful in their trapping. On the morning of January 16, he departed the cabin for Elk Lake. This was the last known sighting of the three men before their deaths.

== Discovery ==
Having had no correspondence with any of the three men since December, and having noticed that mink traps set in the area had been left unmaintained, Morris's brother, Innis Owen Morris, and Pearl Lynnes, superintendent of the Tumalo Fish Hatchery, became suspicious. In April 1924, a search team traveled to the cabin, but found no sign of the men. Inside the cabin, burnt food was in pots on the stove and the dining table had been set for a meal.

Outside, the sled used for the transport of goods and equipment was missing, and a fox pen behind the cabin that contained five valuable foxes owned by Logan was empty. A blood-stained claw hammer was found in the corner of the pen. The search team checked on the men's trapping lines, and discovered the frozen remains of twelve marten, four foxes, and one skunk, suggesting that their traps in the surrounding forest had been unattended to.

The following day, Deschutes County Sheriff Clarence A. Adams arrived at the cabin to begin an investigation. Near the shore of Big Lava Lake, the searchers found the men's large sled, which was marked with dark stains that were later confirmed to be blood. On the edge of the lake, a depression in the ice was detected where a hole had visibly been cut, and frozen over. Nearby, on a trail leading to the lake, a searcher discovered pools of blood in the thawing snow, as well as clumps of hair and a human tooth. The coating of ice on the lake having thawed enough that the searchers could explore by boat, Innis and Adams discovered the bodies of all three men, which had floated to the surface of the lake.

== Investigation ==
Autopsies revealed the men had all died of gunshot wounds as well as blunt force trauma, likely from a hammer. Wilson had been shot in the right shoulder and the back of the head, while Nickols' jawbone had been shattered by a shotgun blast; he also had a bullet hole, likely from a revolver, in his head. Morris had been shot in the left forearm, and also had a skull fracture, presumably from a hammer.

It was estimated that the murders occurred in late December 1923 or early January 1924. In an official police report, Sheriff Claude McCauley wrote of the scene:

Even though the weather was perfect, the clear air was impregnated with the odor of death and decomposition and it was with an undefinable spirit of awe and consternation that the little party of hardy outdoorsmen laid aside their packs, kicked off their snowshoes, and prepared to tackle a grim job which was little to their liking."

According to a published report in April 1924, police believed at least two of the men had not been murdered in close vicinity to the cabin, but had been lured away from it. Initially, police suspected a woodsman and moonshiner named Indian Erickson of the crimes, who maintained a camp at the nearby Cultus Lake. Erickson was dismissed by police, however, after supplying an alibi.

=== Charles Kimzey ===
Logan provided police with a potential suspect shortly after the men's bodies were discovered—a fellow trapper named Lee Collins, who had at one time quarreled with the men over a purportedly stolen wallet. Collins had reportedly threatened to come back and kill Nickols. He was discovered in actuality to be a man named Charles Kimzey, who had been arrested in 1923 for robbery and attempted murder in Bend, in which he threw W. O. Harrison, a stagecoach driver, down a well. Harrison survived, but Kimzey fled before the case went to trial.

A traffic officer in Portland recognized Kimzey as a man who had approached him on January 24, 1924, carrying a gunnysack and asking for directions to a fur dealer in the city. The officer directed him to Schumacher Fur Company on Third Street in Northwest Portland, where the man sold the sack of furs for $110. Police issued a reward of $1,500 for Kimzey's arrest and conviction in connection with the murders, but the case went cold.

On February 17, 1933, nine years after the murders, Kimzey was spotted in Kalispell, Montana, and was apprehended by police and returned to Oregon for questioning in the murders. Though police had a circumstantial case against Kimzey, the fur dealer who had purchased the furs in January 1924 could not positively identify the man as Kimzey.

Kimzey was charged, however, in the 1923 attempted murder of Harrison and sentenced to life imprisonment in the Oregon State Penitentiary. In spite of the circumstantial evidence suggesting Kimzey's involvement in the murders, the case remains officially unsolved.

== In culture ==
A book about the murders, entitled The Trapper Murders, was published by Melany Tupper in 2013. In the book, Tupper suggests that the murders were committed by both Kimzey and an accomplice, Ray Jackson Van Buren, a man from Sweet Home, Oregon, who committed suicide in 1938.

== See also ==
- List of homicides in Oregon
- List of unsolved murders (1900–1979)

== Works cited ==
- Stewart, Donna (2014). Ghosthunting Oregon. Clerisy Press. ISBN 978-1-578-60549-1.
- Tupper, Melany (2013). The Trapper Murders: A True Central Oregon Mystery. Central Oregon Books. ISBN 978-0-983-16915-4.
- Yuskavitch, Jim (2017). Oregon Myths and Legends: The True Stories behind History's Mysteries. Legends of the West (2 ed.). TwoDot. ISBN 978-1-493-02826-9.
