= Elk Lake (Oregon) =

Lake in Oregon, United States

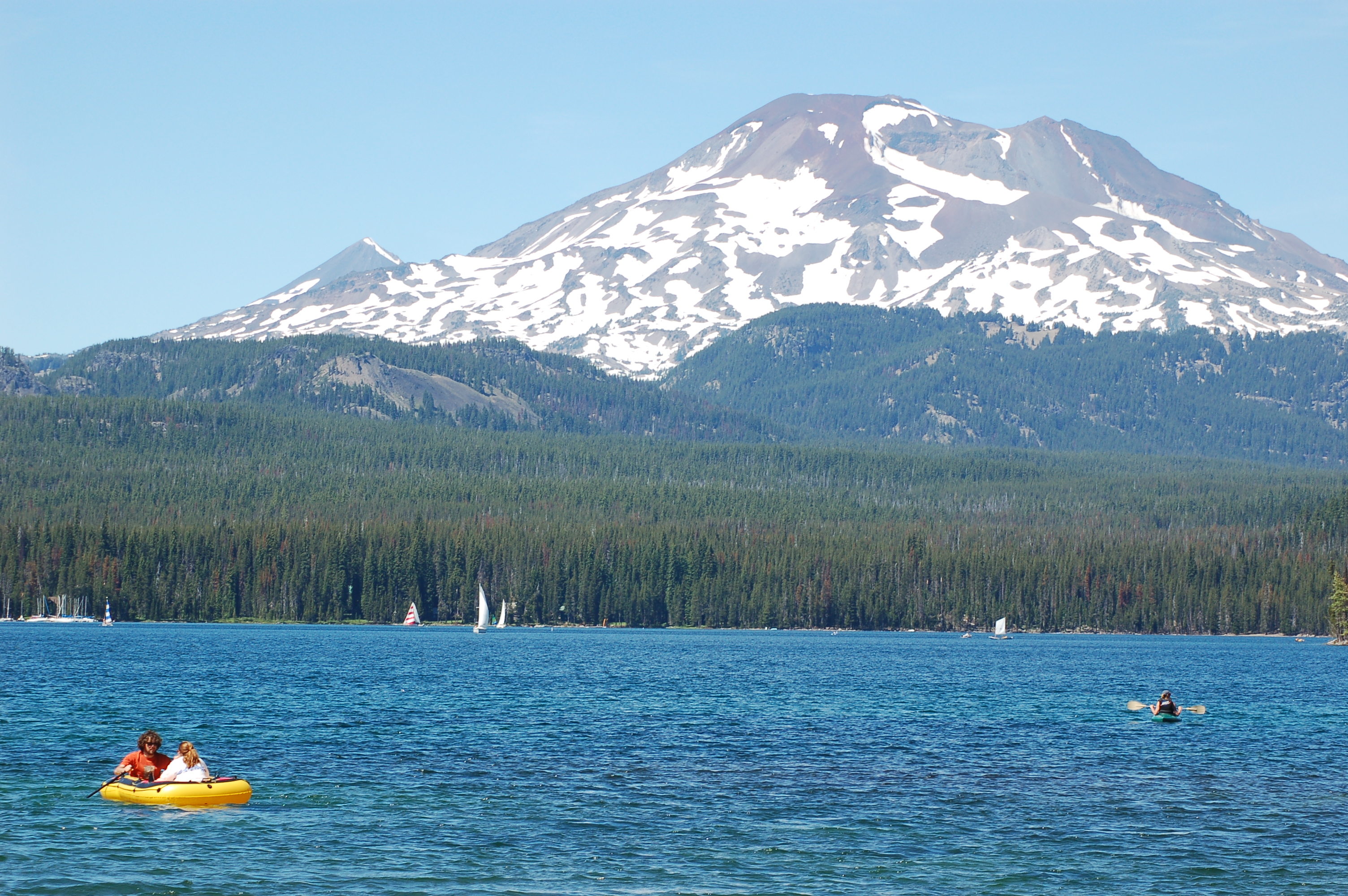
- The lake with South Sister in the background

- Location within Oregon Location within the United States
- Location: Deschutes County, Oregon
- Coordinates: 43°58′27″N 121°48′09″W
- Lake type: Natural, oligotrophic
- Primary inflows: Snowmelt, seepage
- Primary outflows: None on the surface
- Catchment area: 13 square miles (34 km^{2})
- Basin countries: United States
- Surface area: 405 acres (164 ha)
- Average depth: 12 feet (3.7 m)
- Max. depth: 62 feet (19 m)
- Water volume: 7,000 acre-feet (8.6×10^{6} m^{3})
- Residence time: 1 year
- Shore length^{1}: 5.1 miles (8.2 km)
- Surface elevation: 4,882 feet (1,488 m)
- Settlements: Bend
- ^{1} Shore length is not a well-defined measure.

Elk Lake is a natural body of water in the central Cascade Range in the U.S. state of Oregon. Nearly 4,900 feet (1,500 m) above sea level, the lake is part of a volcanic landscape about 25 miles (40 km) west-southwest of Bend along the Cascade Lakes Scenic Byway.

Elk Lake is about 6 miles (10 km) west of Mount Bachelor in Deschutes National Forest. Nearby lakes include Hosmer, Sparks, Blow, Doris, Devils, Lava, and Little Lava.

Heavily used for recreation, the lake is among the most popular of the Cascade Lakes. Its name stems from the large number of elk that formerly frequented the area in summer. During winter, Elk Lake freezes, and access roads are usually closed by snow until late May.

The popular fishing game Russian Fishing 4 added Elk Lake as its first non-Russian fishing map in June 2025, featuring a variety of bluegills and gars.

== Recreation ==
The United States Forest Service manages campgrounds, boat launches, and picnic sites at various locations around the lake, also served by a private resort with cabins. Lake activities include sailing, fishing, swimming, and windsurfing.

The lake supports populations of brook trout generally ranging from 7 to 14 inches (18 to 36 cm) and kokanee averaging 8 to 9 inches (20 to 23 cm). Hiking trails leading to other high-elevation lake groups, such as those in the Mink Lake basin, begin at Elk Lake.

== See also ==
- List of lakes in Oregon
