= Wickiup Reservoir =

Lake in Oregon, United States

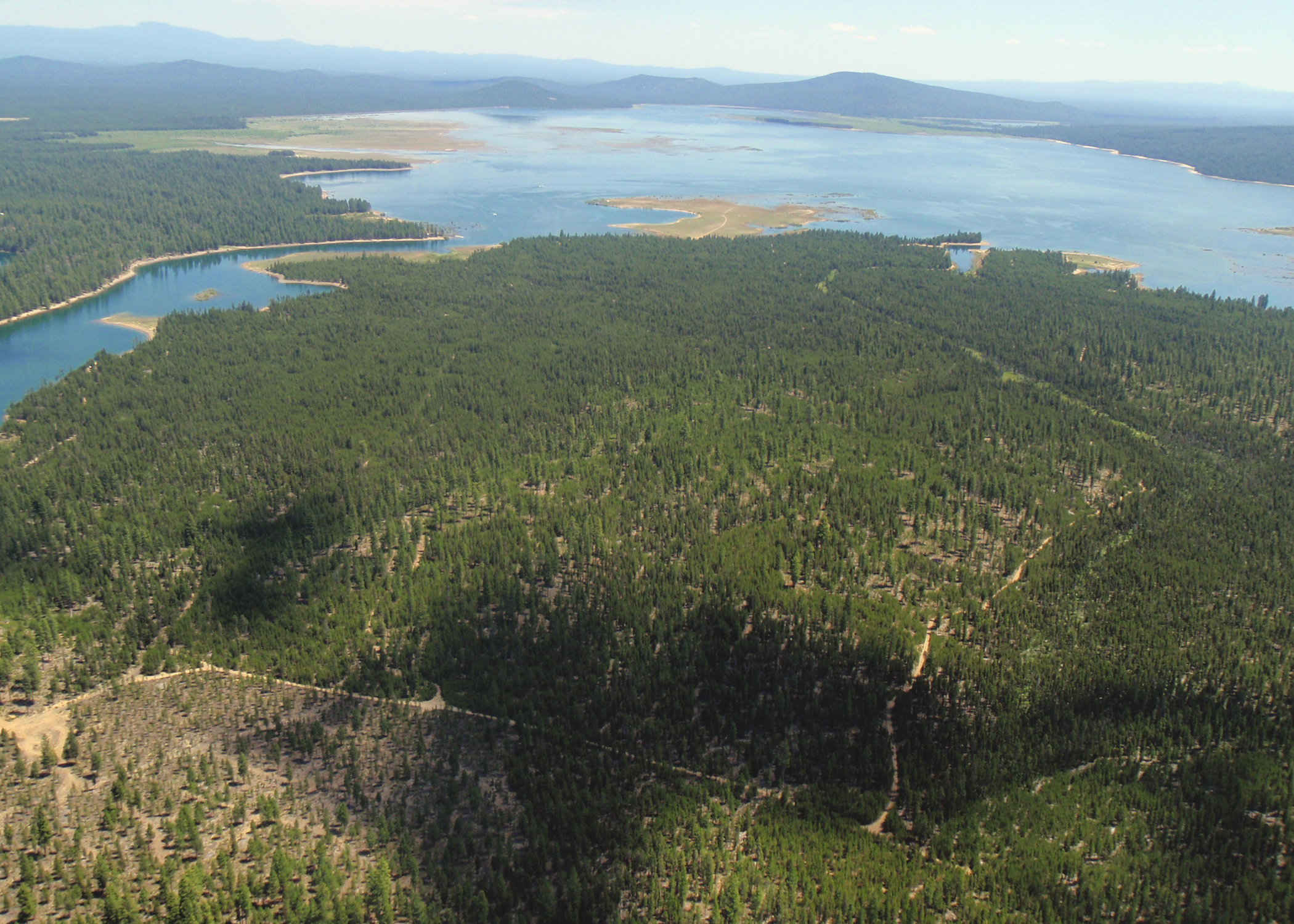
- Aerial view of Wickiup Reservoir

- Location within Oregon Location within the United States
- Location: Deschutes County, near La Pine, Oregon, US
- Coordinates: 43°41′25″N 121°41′54″W
- Primary inflows: Deschutes River
- Primary outflows: Deschutes River
- Catchment area: 253 mi^{2} (660 km^{2})
- Basin countries: United States
- Surface area: 10,334 acres (4,182 ha)
- Average depth: 20 ft (6.1 m)
- Max. depth: 70 ft (21 m)
- Water volume: 206,880 acre⋅ft (255,180,000 m^{3})
- Residence time: 5 months
- Shore length^{1}: 50.5 mi (81.3 km)
- Surface elevation: 4,338 ft (1,322 m)
- ^{1} Shore length is not a well-defined measure.

Wickiup Reservoir is the second-largest reservoir in the U.S. state of Oregon. It is located 60 miles (97 km) southwest of Bend, and is the largest of the Cascade Lakes. Wickiup Reservoir is close to the Twin Lakes, Davis Lake, Crane Prairie Reservoir, Cultus Lake, and Little Cultus Lake. The reservoir is located within the Deschutes National Forest and the Fort Rock Ranger District, near the Cascade Lakes Scenic Byway.

Like nearby Crane Prairie Reservoir, Wickiup Reservoir was created by damming of the Deschutes River. The Wickiup Dam was built in 1949 by the United States Bureau of Reclamation for the "Deschutes Project" and "Pringle Falls Experimental Forest", which is used for education and research. Other nearby dams include the Crane Prairie Dam and the Haystack Dam. Wickiup Reservoir's earthen dam is 2.6 miles (4.2 km) long. The Deschutes River, which originates at Little Lava Lake, is an inflow and an outflow of Wickiup Reservoir.

The average depth of the reservoir is 20 feet (6.1 m), with depths up to 70 feet (21 m) in channels. Because of this, fishing is very popular in the lake, especially for brown trout. Wickiup Reservoir is dubbed as the best lake for brown trout fishing in the state. The trout average between 5 and 8 pounds (2.3 and 3.6 kg), but some reach over 20 pounds (9.1 kg).

According to the United States Forest Service, Wickiup Reservoir is one of Central Oregon's best wildlife viewing areas. Some of the nature that thrives in the area include waterfowl, shorebirds, hoofed mammals, ponderosa pine, and lodgepole pine.

Also at Wickiup Reservoir are several recreation options. There are six campgrounds on site, all of which include a boat ramp, toilets and water.

On August 12, 2009, the Oregon Department of Human Services issued a health advisory due to a large algae bloom. They mentioned that "drinking water from Wickiup Reservoir was dangerous, even if boiled or treated" and that anyone who relies on the water from the lake should find an alternate source.

Since 2020 the reservoir has faced persistent problems maintaining adequate water levels due to drought conditions and required outflows for environmental and agricultural purposes. On at least one occasion the reservoir level was below "dead pool."

== Climate ==
Climate data for Wickiup Dam, Oregon
Month	Jan	Feb	Mar	Apr	May	Jun	Jul	Aug	Sep	Oct	Nov	Dec	Year
Mean daily maximum °F (°C)	39.7 (4.3)	43.1 (6.2)	48.1 (8.9)	53.8 (12.1)	63.4 (17.4)	71.2 (21.8)	82.5 (28.1)	82.4 (28.0)	75.3 (24.1)	61.8 (16.6)	46.3 (7.9)	38.1 (3.4)	58.8 (14.9)
Daily mean °F (°C)	30.4 (−0.9)	32.5 (0.3)	36.9 (2.7)	41.8 (5.4)	49.8 (9.9)	56.5 (13.6)	64.9 (18.3)	64.0 (17.8)	56.9 (13.8)	46.5 (8.1)	36.2 (2.3)	29.5 (−1.4)	45.5 (7.5)
Mean daily minimum °F (°C)	21.1 (−6.1)	21.9 (−5.6)	25.7 (−3.5)	29.8 (−1.2)	36.3 (2.4)	41.8 (5.4)	47.3 (8.5)	45.6 (7.6)	38.4 (3.6)	31.3 (−0.4)	26.2 (−3.2)	20.9 (−6.2)	32.2 (0.1)
Average precipitation inches (mm)	2.97 (75)	2.04 (52)	1.72 (44)	1.25 (32)	1.32 (34)	0.90 (23)	0.45 (11)	0.59 (15)	0.61 (15)	1.45 (37)	2.60 (66)	3.62 (92)	19.52 (496)
Average snowfall inches (cm)	17.9 (45)	14.9 (38)	8.4 (21)	2.0 (5.1)	0.3 (0.76)	0.0 (0.0)	0.0 (0.0)	0.0 (0.0)	0.0 (0.0)	0.8 (2.0)	8.9 (23)	20.7 (53)	73.9 (187.86)
Source: NOAA

== See also ==
- List of lakes in Oregon
