= Hosmer Lake =

Lake in Oregon, United States

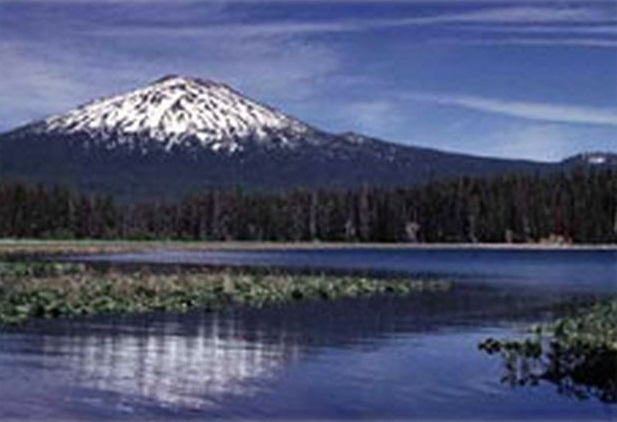
- Hosmer Lake and Mount Bachelor

- Location within Oregon Location within the United States
- Location: Deschutes County, Oregon
- Coordinates: 43°57′49″N 121°46′49″W
- Lake type: Natural, mesotrophic, with dam
- Primary inflows: Quinn Creek
- Primary outflows: None on the surface
- Catchment area: 13 square miles (34 km^{2})
- Basin countries: United States
- Surface area: 198 acres (80 ha)
- Average depth: 3 feet (0.9 m)
- Max. depth: 12 feet (3.7 m)
- Water volume: 600 acre-feet (740,000 m^{3})
- Shore length^{1}: 5 miles (8 km)
- Surface elevation: 4,964 feet (1,513 m)
- Settlements: Bend
- ^{1} Shore length is not a well-defined measure.

Hosmer Lake is a natural body of water in the central Cascade Range in the U.S. state of Oregon. Nearly 5,000 feet (1,500 m) above sea level, the lake is part of a volcanic landscape about 20 miles (32 km) west-southwest of Bend along the Cascade Lakes Scenic Byway. In 1962, the United States Board on Geographic Names changed the name from Mud Lake to Hosmer Lake in honor of Paul Hosmer, a naturalist from Bend.

Hosmer Lake is about 5 miles (8 km) west of Mount Bachelor in Deschutes National Forest. Nearby lakes include Elk, Sparks, Blow, Doris, Lava, and Little Lava.

Encroaching vegetation is gradually turning Hosmer Lake into a marsh. The lake bottom consists of mud and peat, and mosses and aquatic plants restrict the open water. Water lilies and bullrushes are prevalent.

== Recreation ==
Formerly populated by trash fish, including carp, the lake was treated with rotenone in 1957 and restocked with Atlantic salmon. The landlocked salmon experiment proved successful, and in the 21st century the lake has been called "one of the richest lakes in the Deschutes National Forest". The lake supports populations of "very large" brook trout as well as "deep-bodied" salmon. Only fly-fishing with barbless flies is permitted on Hosmer Lake, and salmon must be released if caught. Boats with electric motors may slowly ply the lake, which is also open to canoes and other non-motorized craft.

Mallard Marsh Campground and South Campground, managed by the United States Forest Service, are near the southwest end of the lake. Between them, they have about three dozen campsites, a paved boat ramp, and access to hiking and horse-riding trails. Snow may block access to the lake through the winter months and sometimes as late as June.

== See also ==
- List of lakes of Oregon
