= Lava Lake =

Lava Lake may refer to:

- Lava Lake (Oregon)
- Lava Lake (British Columbia)
- Lava Lakes
- Little Lava Lake

== See also ==
- Lava lake, a lake of molten or solidified lava
