= Sisters State Park =

State park in Oregon, United States

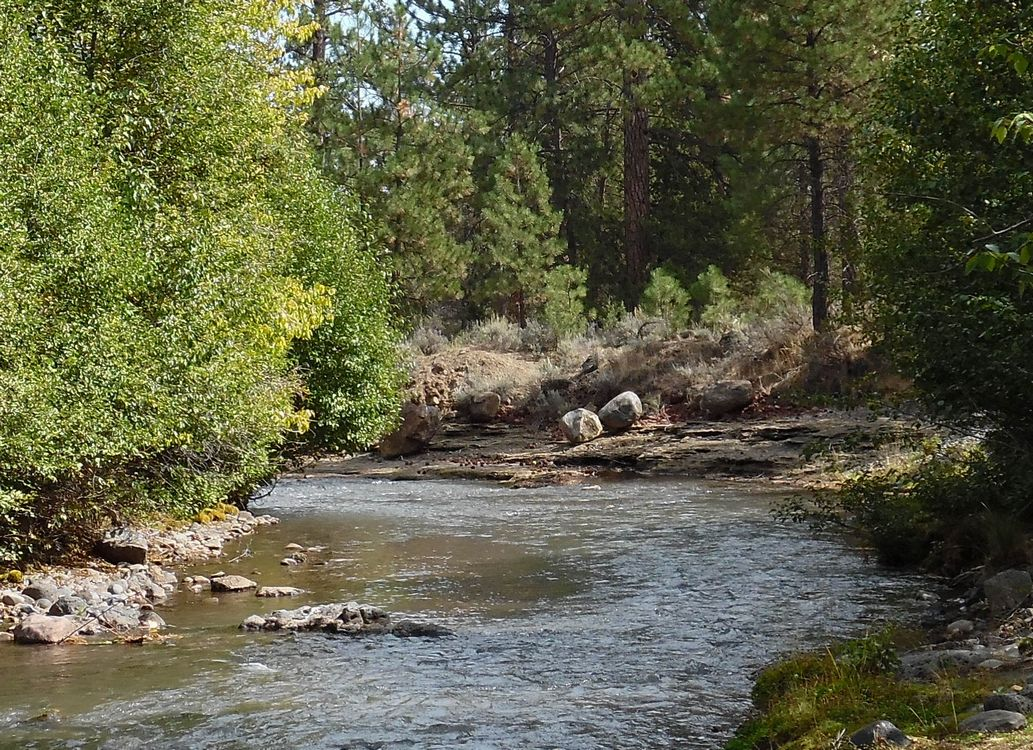
- Whychus Creek in Sisters State Park

- Location within Oregon Location within the United States
- Location: Deschutes County, Oregon
- Nearest city: Sisters, Oregon, US
- Coordinates: 44°17′15″N 121°32′16″W
- Area: 28 acres (11 ha)
- Created: 1939
- Operator: Oregon Parks and Recreation Department

Sisters State Park is a state park located at the southeast side of the town of Sisters in Deschutes County, Oregon, United States. The park property is bisected by U.S. Route 20 and Oregon Route 126, creating three separate parcels. The park covers 28 acres (11 ha) of undeveloped forest land along Whychus Creek. It is adjacent to two developed city parks that were once part of the state park. Sisters State Park is administered by the Oregon Parks and Recreation Department.

== History ==
Sister State Park is located near where four Native American trails converged. One of the trails came from the north, originating near The Dalles. Another came trail from the northeast. A third came from the Sparks Lake area, to the southwest. The fourth trail came from the west, along what was later called the Scott Trail.

Sister State Park was established in 1939. The park was named for the adjacent town of Sisters. The town of Sisters takes its name from the Three Sisters, three large volcanic mountains located in the Cascade Range overlooking the community.

The original 41 acres (17 ha) on the outskirts of Sisters was purchased by Louis W. Hill for $1,532. The price Hill paid for the property was based on a rate of $4 per thousand board feet for 383,000 board feet of standing ponderosa pine timber growing on the land at the time he bought it. After he purchased to land, Hill donated it to the State of Oregon for a park or some other public purpose. It was Hill's desire to preserve the old-growth pine forest on the property for the use and enjoyment of future generations. Hill also wanted to ensure that the property was not used for any purpose that might create a traffic hazard at the adjacent highway junction.

In 1983, the State of Oregon transferred ownership of 13 acres (5.3 ha) of park land to the City of Sisters. The area given to the city is all on the west side of U.S. Route 20. The city used the land to create two municipal parks adjacent to the remaining state park property. The city established a day-use picnic area on the north side of Squaw Creek (now officially renamed Whychus Creek). On the south side of the creek, the city took over the state's existing campground. The day-use site is called Creekside Park while the camping area is known as Sisters Creekside Campground. Both parks are owned and maintained by the City of Sisters. The remaining state park property is east of the two municipal parks.

In 1990, the City of Sisters created a park master plan that identified how the two creek side parks would be developed. However, the city never submitted the plan to the State of Oregon for approval. A subsequent city plan in 2011 suggested that a playground and volleyball courts be built at the park site. The plan also recommended that the existing restroom facilities be renovated, electrical upgrade be made to park lighting, and a kiosk with a city map be installed. However, no action was taken to implement those plans. In 2014, the Oregon Parks and Recreation Department notified the city that no new development will be allowed in either of the municipal parks until a new Creekside Park Master Plan is submitted and approved.

== Topography ==
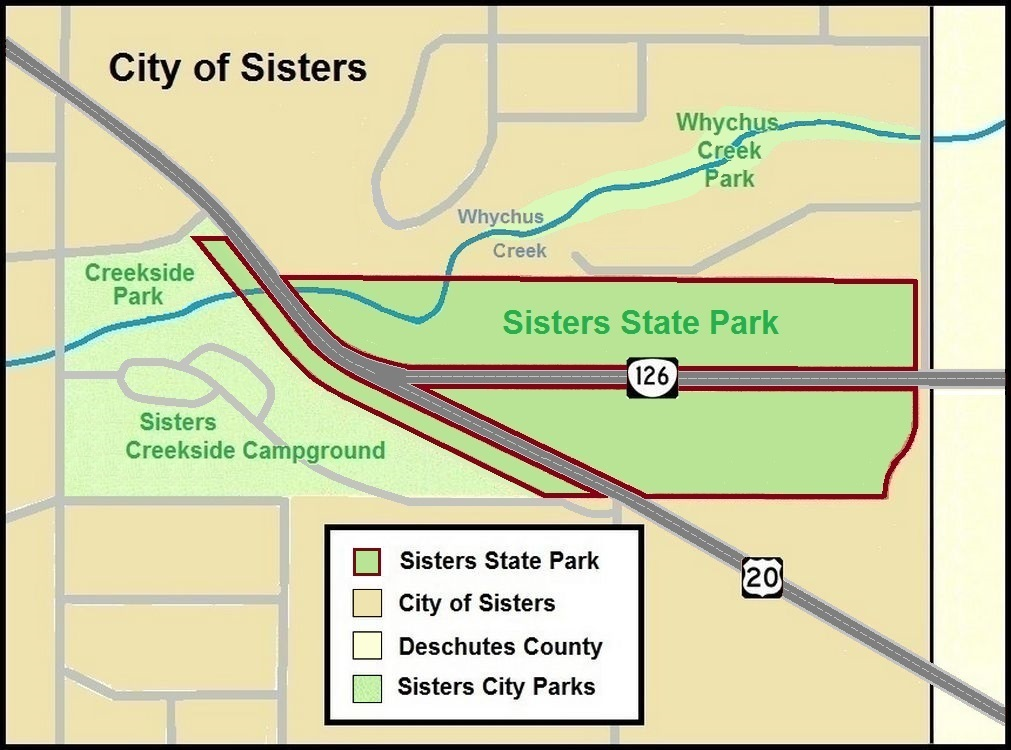
Sisters State Park and adjacent city parks

Sisters State Park is located inside the city limits of Sisters, a small incorporated town within Deschutes County in Central Oregon. The land to the north and south of Sisters State Park is zoned for residential development. To the west are two municipal parks. The east side of the park is bordered by a city street with the city limits on the opposite side of the road.

The park is bisected by U.S. Route 20 and Oregon Route 126. The junction of the two highways is the middle of the park, dividing the state park property into three parts. One parcel is a narrow strip of land that runs along the west side of the Route 20. The other two parcels are located north and south of Route 126.

Whychus Creek is a perennial stream with headwaters in the Three Sisters Wilderness area. The creek flows southwest to northeast through the park. On the west side, the creek divides the two municipal parks. It then flows under the highway and through Sisters State Park, exiting park property on the north side boundary. The land throughout the park area is generally flat with a gentle down-hill slope toward Whychus Creek.

== Ecology ==
Whychus Creek creates a narrow riparian zone through the middle of the park area. However, most of the park is open conifer forest. The park has loose alluvial soil. The soil supports a large stand of old-growth Ponderosa pine. Quaking aspen are also found in the park. Manzanita and wax currant a common ground cover plants in the area. Local wildflowers include arrow balsam, Indian paintbrush, lupine, penstemon, and pinedrop.

The water level in Whychus Creek fluctuates dramatically with the seasons, running high in the spring and dropping to a minimal flow in late summer. Nevertheless, the stream does maintain a native fish population. Fishing near of the campground is poor. However, there are small rainbow trout found upstream from the campground. Larger fish including redband trout up to 18 inches (46 cm) in length can be found downstream near where the creek flows into the Deschutes River.

Large mammals found in the Whychus Creek watershed include black-tail deer, mule deer, coyote, American black bear, and bobcat. Smaller mammals include American badger, common porcupine, striped skunk, raccoon, black-tailed jackrabbit, western gray squirrel, golden-mantled ground squirrel, and least chipmunk.

Mountain chickadee, Western meadowlark, mountain bluebird, Brewer's blackbirds, and several warbler species are common in the Sisters area. Other larger birds found in the area include northern flicker, black-billed magpie, American kestrel, Cooper's hawk, and red-tailed hawk plus 11 woodpeckers species.

== Adjacent parks ==
While the remaining 28 acres (11 ha) of state park land are undeveloped, the adjacent 13 acres (5.3 ha) municipal park area is developed for both day-use and camping. The two adjacent municipal parks are both well used. The parks have good access roads and parking areas. Creekside Park has a large well maintained lawn, a drinking fountain, benches, picnic tables, and barbeque grills for day-use. The camping area in Sisters Creekside Campground has several grassy areas with potable water taps, restrooms, and a shower facility. The campground has 60 campsites including 25 with recreational vehicle hook-ups. There are picnic tables and fire pits at individual campsites. The two parks are divided by Whychus Creek. However, there is a covered walking bridge connecting the parks. Both parks are within walking distance of downtown Sisters.

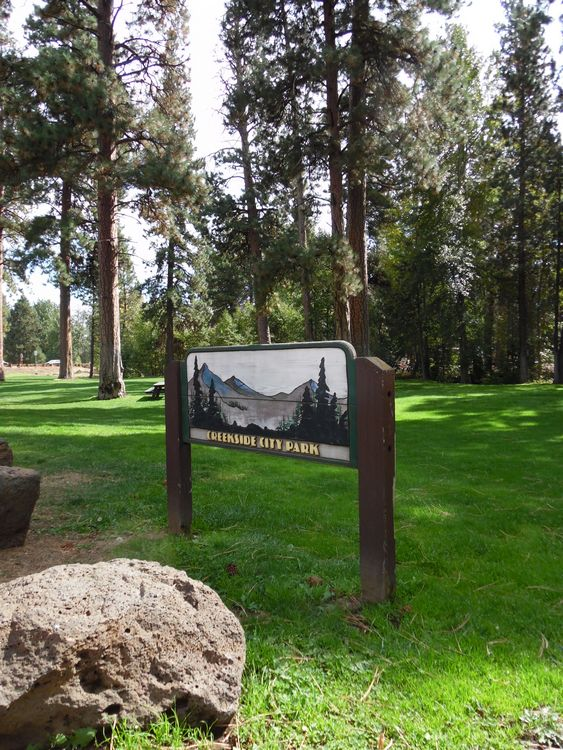
*Creekside Park

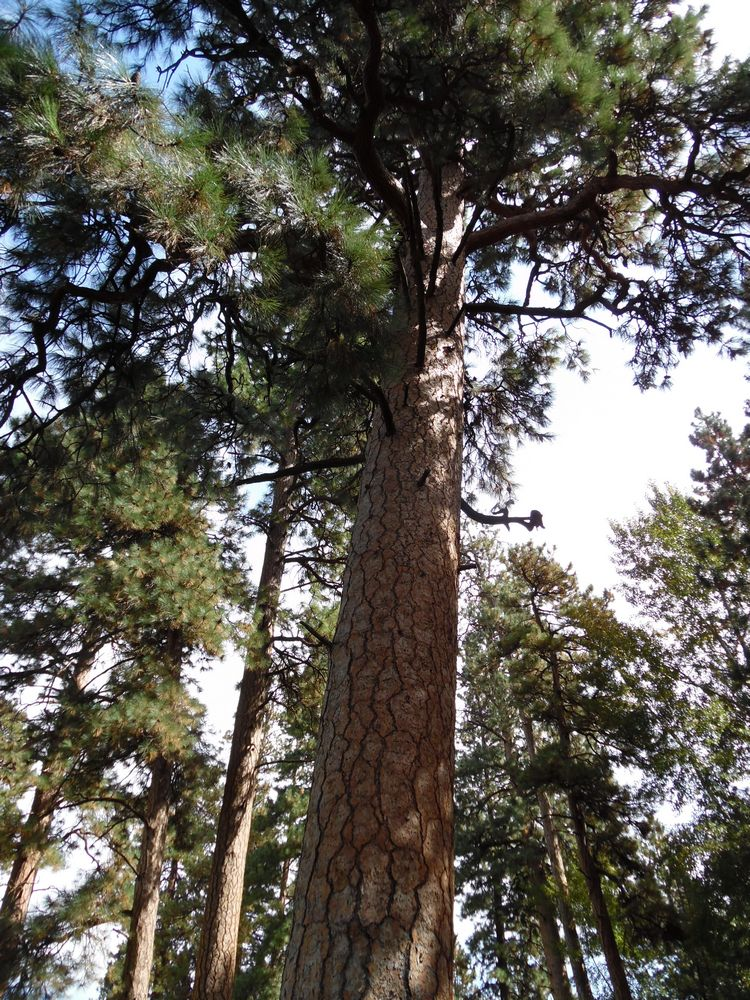
*Old-growth pine

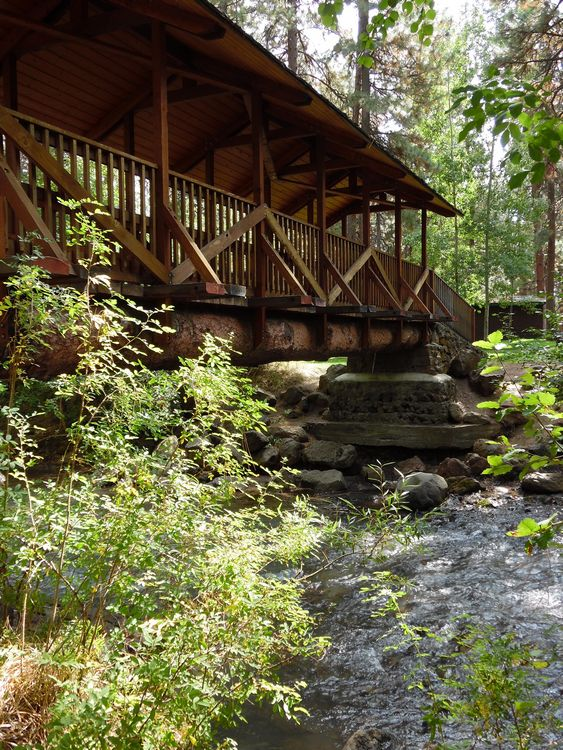
*Walking bridge

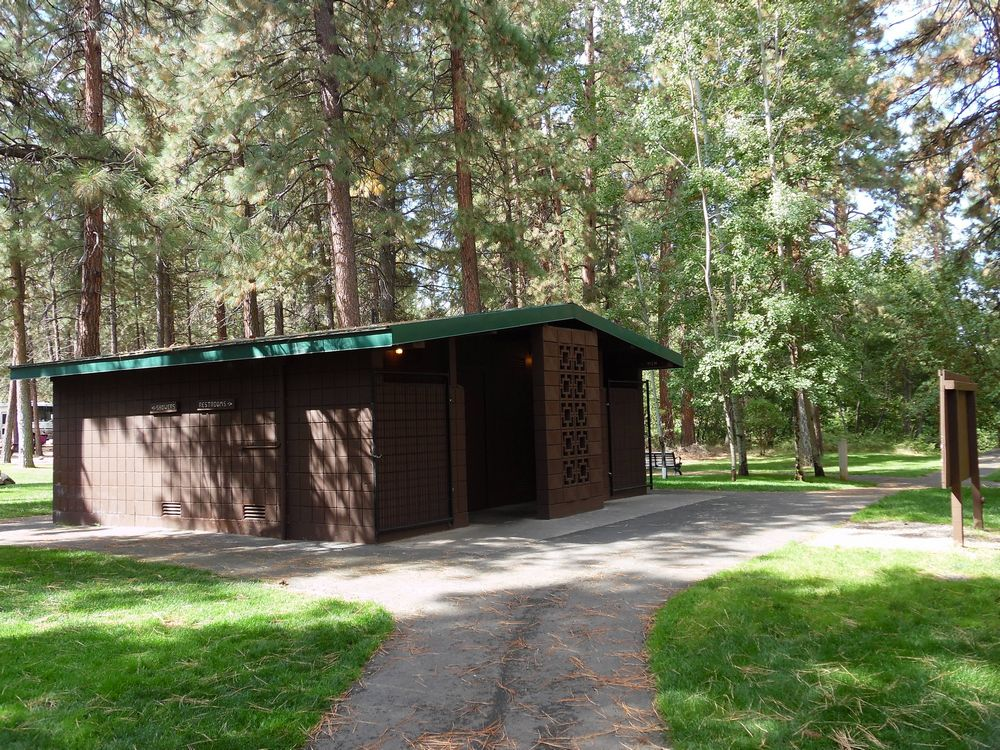
*Park facilities

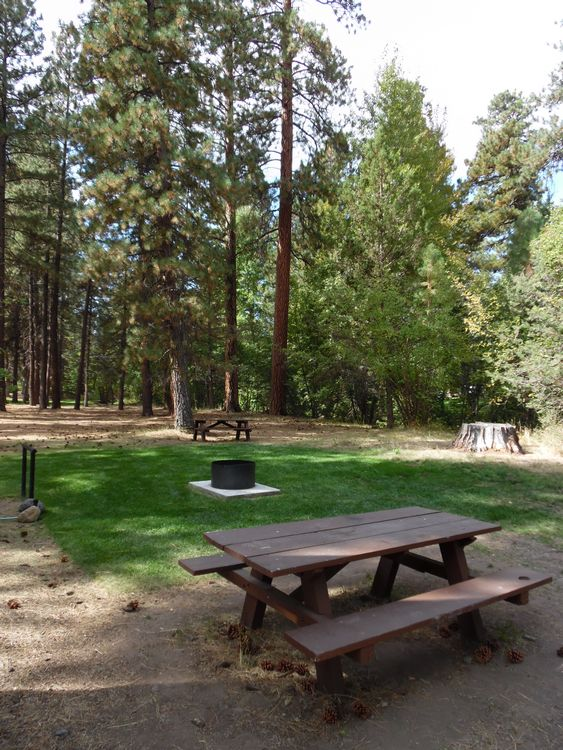
*Campground site
