= Cultus Lake =

Cultus Lake may refer to:

- Cultus Lake, British Columbia, Canada
- Cultus Lake (Oregon), United States
- Little Cultus Lake, Oregon, United States
