= Cascade Highway =

Cascade Highway may refer to:

- Cascade Highway (Washington), a portion of U.S. Route 2 through the northern Cascades in Washington, U.S.
- Cascade Highway (Oregon), a portion of Oregon Route 213 running from Silverton to Stayton in Oregon, U.S.

== See also ==
- Cascade Lakes Highway, a National Scenic Byway in central Oregon, U.S.
- Cascade Locks Highway, a scenic highway in the U.S. state of Oregon, U.S.
