= Wickiup =

Wickiup may refer to:

- Wigwam, a domed native American dwelling; wickiup is commonly used in the southwestern U.S.
- Wickiup, annual college yearbook published by Idaho State University, circa 1907–1981
- Wickiup Reservoir, second-largest reservoir in the U.S. state of Oregon located southwest of Bend in the Cascade Lakes

== See also ==
Wikiup is an alternate spelling

- Larkfield-Wikiup, California, a census-designated location
- Wikieup, Arizona, an unincorporated community
