= Haystack Dam =

- Location of Haystack Dam Haystack Dam (the United States)
- Country: United States
- Location: Jefferson County, Oregon
- Coordinates: 44°29′56″N 121°09′18″W
- Purpose: Storage for Deschutes Project
- Opening date: 1957
- Built by: United States Bureau of Reclamation
- Owner: United States Bureau of Reclamation
- Operator: North Unit Irrigation District

Dam and spillways
- Height: 105 ft (32 m)
- Length: 1,200 ft (370 m)

Reservoir
- Creates: Haystack Reservoir
- Total capacity: 5,600 acre⋅ft (6,900,000 m^{3})
- Surface area: 233 acres (94 ha)
- Normal elevation: 2,844 ft (867 m)

Haystack Dam (National ID # OR00287) is a dam in central Oregon, about ten miles south of Madras. The earthen dam was constructed in 1957 by the United States Bureau of Reclamation, with a height of 105 feet (32 m) and 1,200 feet (370 m) long at its crest. It serves as an offstream storage facility as part of the larger Deschutes Project, which also includes the Crane Prairie Reservoir and the Wickiup Reservoir. The dam is owned by the Bureau and operated by the local North Unit Irrigation District.

The reservoir it creates, Haystack Reservoir, has a water surface of 233 acres (94 ha), about five linear miles of shoreline, and a maximum capacity of 5,600 acre-feet (6,900,000 m^{3}). Recreation includes fishing (for largemouth bass, crappie, rainbow trout, kokanee, brown trout, and brown bullhead), camping, boating, and hunting.
