= Cultus =

Cultus may refer to:

- Cult (religious practice)
- Cultus (stonefly), a genus of stoneflies
- Cultus Bay, a bay in Washington
- Cultus Lake (disambiguation)
- Cultus River, a river in Oregon
- Cultus Sound, a sound in British Columbia
- Suzuki Cultus, a car model by Suzuki
