= Lake Davis (disambiguation) =

Lake Davis may refer to:

- Lake Davis, a reservoir in Plumas County, California
- Lake Davis, California, a census-designated place in Plumas County

== See also ==
- Davis Lake (disambiguation)
