= Todd Lake (Oregon) =

Lake in Oregon, United States

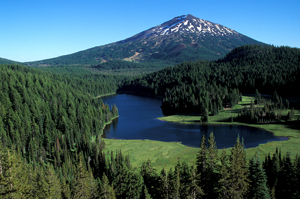
- Todd Lake with Mount Bachelor beyond

- Location within Oregon Location within the United States
- Location: Deschutes National Forest, Oregon
- Coordinates: 44.029°N 121.685°W
- Type: Natural
- Primary inflows: Snow melt and Bare Lake drainage
- Primary outflows: Todd Creek
- Catchment area: 0.9 square miles (2.3 km^{2})
- Max. length: 0.5 mi (0.80 km)
- Max. width: 0.15 mi (0.24 km)
- Surface area: 45 acres (0.18 km^{2})
- Average depth: 21 ft (6.4 m)
- Max. depth: 60 ft (18 m)
- Shore length^{1}: 1.2 mi (1.9 km)
- Surface elevation: 6,150 ft (1,870 m)
- ^{1} Shore length is not a well-defined measure.

Todd Lake is a natural lake near the crest of the Cascade Range in central Oregon in the United States. The lake covers 45 acres (18 ha). It is named in honor of John Y. Todd, an early Missourian settler who settled in the Central Oregon area and participated in the Mexican–American War. Today, the lake and surrounding forest is managed by the U.S. Forest Service as part of the Deschutes National Forest. The Oregon Department of Fish and Wildlife regularly stocks the lake with brook trout. There is a day-use area and a rustic campground located on the west shore. In the summer, the lake is a popular outdoor recreation site for picnicking, fishing, hiking, and nature viewing. In the winter, trails in the area are used for cross-country skiing and snowshoeing.

== History ==
Originally, Todd Lake was called "Lost Lake" because it was difficult for people to find. In the early 20th century, citizens of Bend, Oregon, asked that the name of the lake be changed to avoid confusion with several other Oregon lakes with the same name. In 1922, the name of the lake was officially changed to Todd Lake, honoring John Y. Todd, an early pioneer in central Oregon who immigrated to the state in 1852. In 1860, he built the first bridge across the Deschutes River and later became a successful cattle rancher. Todd founded the Farewell Bend Ranch, which gave the city of Bend its name.

Todd Lake and the surrounding forest are part of the Bend-Fort Rock Ranger District, an administrative sub-division of the Deschutes National Forest. In 1964, the United States Congress created the Three Sisters Wilderness surrounding the Three Sisters mountains in Oregon's Cascade Range. Todd Lake is just outside the southern boundary of the wilderness. As a result, Todd Lake is a major wilderness access point for hikers.

Road access to Todd Lake has always been via Forest Road 46 (also known as the Cascade Lakes Highway). In 1989, the Forest Service designated the road as a National Forest Scenic Byway. In 1997, the State of Oregon made the road an Oregon state scenic byway. A year later, the federal government officially designated the highway as a national scenic byway, calling it the Cascade Lakes Scenic Byway. Many travel guides for the Cascade Lakes Scenic Byway mention Todd Lake, highlighting its location as the first Cascade lake along the byway.

== Geology and geography ==
Todd Lake is located on the east side of the Cascade Range in central Oregon, 24 miles (39 km) southwest of Bend. It is situated in a small glacial valley at the base of Broken Top, south of the peak. The glacier that created the valley melted away about 13,000 years ago, leaving a glacial cirque. As a result, the lake is relatively deep for its size. The lake's elevation is 6,150 feet (1,870 m) above sea level.

Most of the lake water comes from snow melt. The only year-round inflow is drainage from Bare Lake, a very small natural lake located 0.5 miles (0.80 km) southwest of Todd Lake. The lake's only outlet is Todd Creek, which begins at the south end of the lake. Todd Creek disappears in a lava field approximately 2 miles (3.2 km) southwest of the lake.

== Environment ==
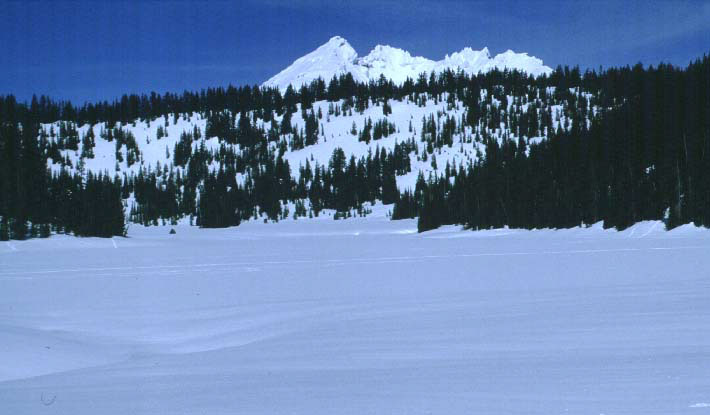
Todd Lake, frozen and covered with snow

The watershed that drains into Todd Lake, covering only 0.9 square miles (2.3 km^{2}), is covered by a dense conifer forest. Mountain hemlock, lodgepole pine, and various fir species dominate the forest around the lake. However, there is a narrow strip of meadow land along the south and west side of the lake, and a large meadow at the north end.

Todd Lake is a natural lake that covers 45 acres (0.18 km^{2}). It is approximately 0.5 miles (0.8 km) long and 0.15 miles (240 m) wide. The lake has an average depth of 21 feet (6.4 m) with a maximum depth of 60 feet (18 m) near its south end.

Because of its sheltered location, Todd Lake has distinct thermal stratification levels within its water column. As a result, water below 15 feet (4.6 m) in depth remains extremely cold even during the summer. The alkalinity level is typical of other high-elevation lakes in the Cascade Range. The lake's water transparency is good, with a Secchi disk depth of 23 feet (7 m). Concentration of chlorophyll in the lake is low. A 1982 study showed that Todd Lake had a high concentration of phosphorus, which is typical of mountain lakes in the central Cascades. Based on available data, the lake's trophic state is classified as oligotrophic.

== Flora ==
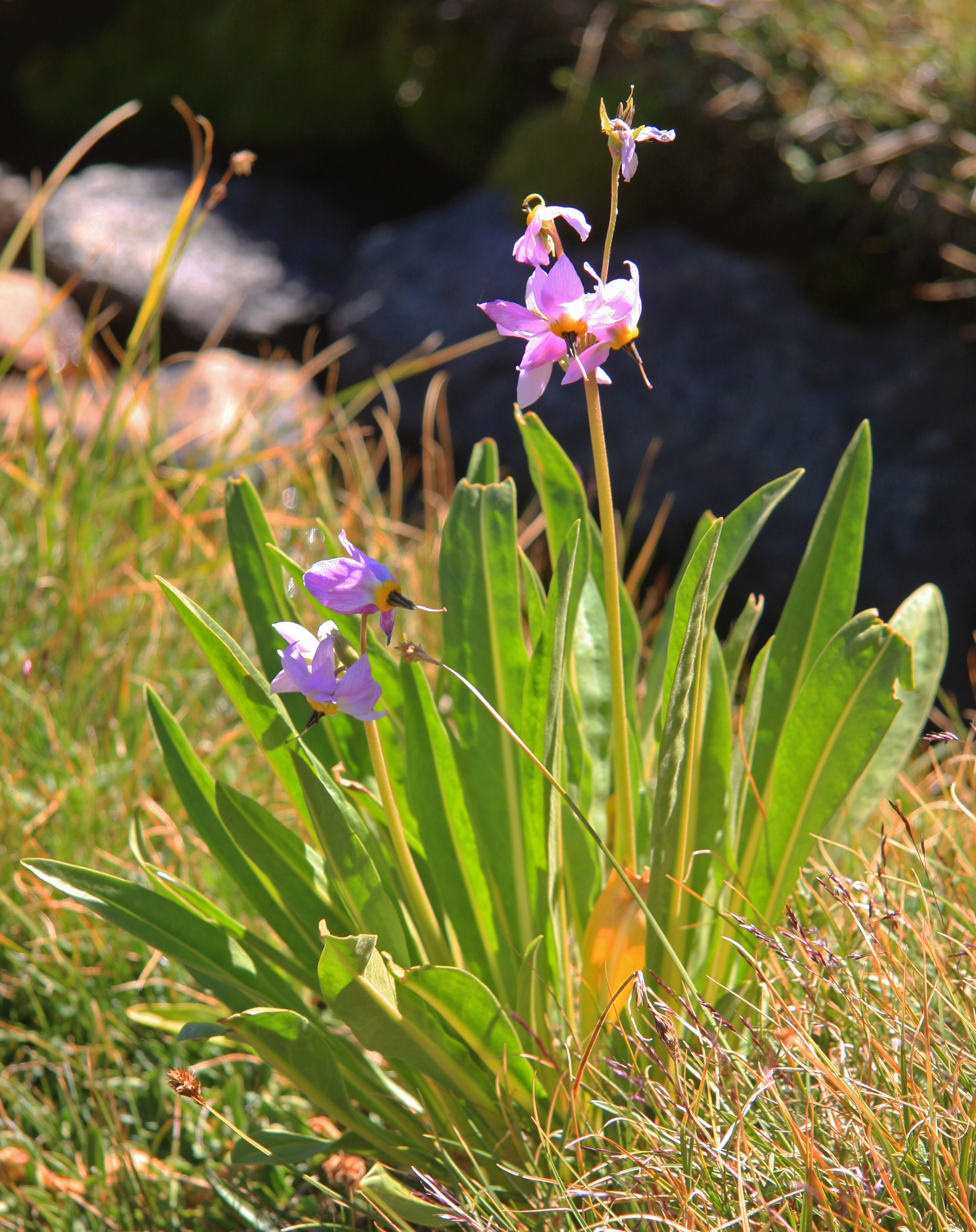
Jeffrey's shooting star

There is a great diversity of plant life in the areas around Todd Lake. The conifer forest that surrounds the lake is dominated by mountain hemlock, lodgepole pine, and various fir species. Ground cover in the shaded parts of the forest includes bog huckleberry, whortleberry, smooth woodrush, Brewer's mitrewort, and sidebells. In open areas of the forest Jacob's ladder, alpine lake agoseris, and larkspur are common ground cover.

The meadow areas around Todd Lake are well known for their wildflowers, which bloom from late June through mid-August. The peak of the wildflower display is in mid-July. Many wildflowers continue to bloom throughout the summer, making Todd Lake an ideal place for nature viewing. As a result, the Forest Service has designated the lake as a Pacific Northwest Region wildflower viewing area.

The wildflower show begins in late June when the Jeffrey's shooting star and white marsh marigold bloom in the wet meadows and riparian areas. Newberry's knotweed is an early bloomer on the well-drained slopes above the lake. Then, elephanthead and other alpine plants begin to bloom in the meadows and along the lake shore.

Common meadow wildflowers include Jeffrey's shooting star, elephanthead, Gorman's buttercup, alpine asters, American alpine speedwell, Indian paintbrush, small-flowered paintbrush, high mountain cinquefoil, Gray's ligusticum, green false hellebore, swamp laurel, and white bog orchid (Habenaria dilatata). Also, Jeffrey's shooting star and marsh marigold grow close to the lake shore. In the moist riparian area near the lake's outlet, there are Gorman's buttercup, yellow monkeyflower, Lewis monkey flower, arrowleaf groundsel, and false asphodel. Oregon saxifrage lives in some of the boggy areas around the lake.

On the edge of the meadows near the forest and along the Bare Creek drainage, there are high mountain cinquefoil, Gray's ligusticum, Sitka valerian, cobwebby Indian paintbrush, harsh Indian paintbrush, broadleaf lupine, and alpine lake agoseris. On drier slopes above the lake, Newberry's knotweed, larkspur, bracted lousewort, peregrine fleabane, dwarf lupine, sulphur flower, Martindale's lomatium, pussypaws, pink mountain heather, and Brewers mountain heather are common along with alpine lake agoseris.

== Fauna ==
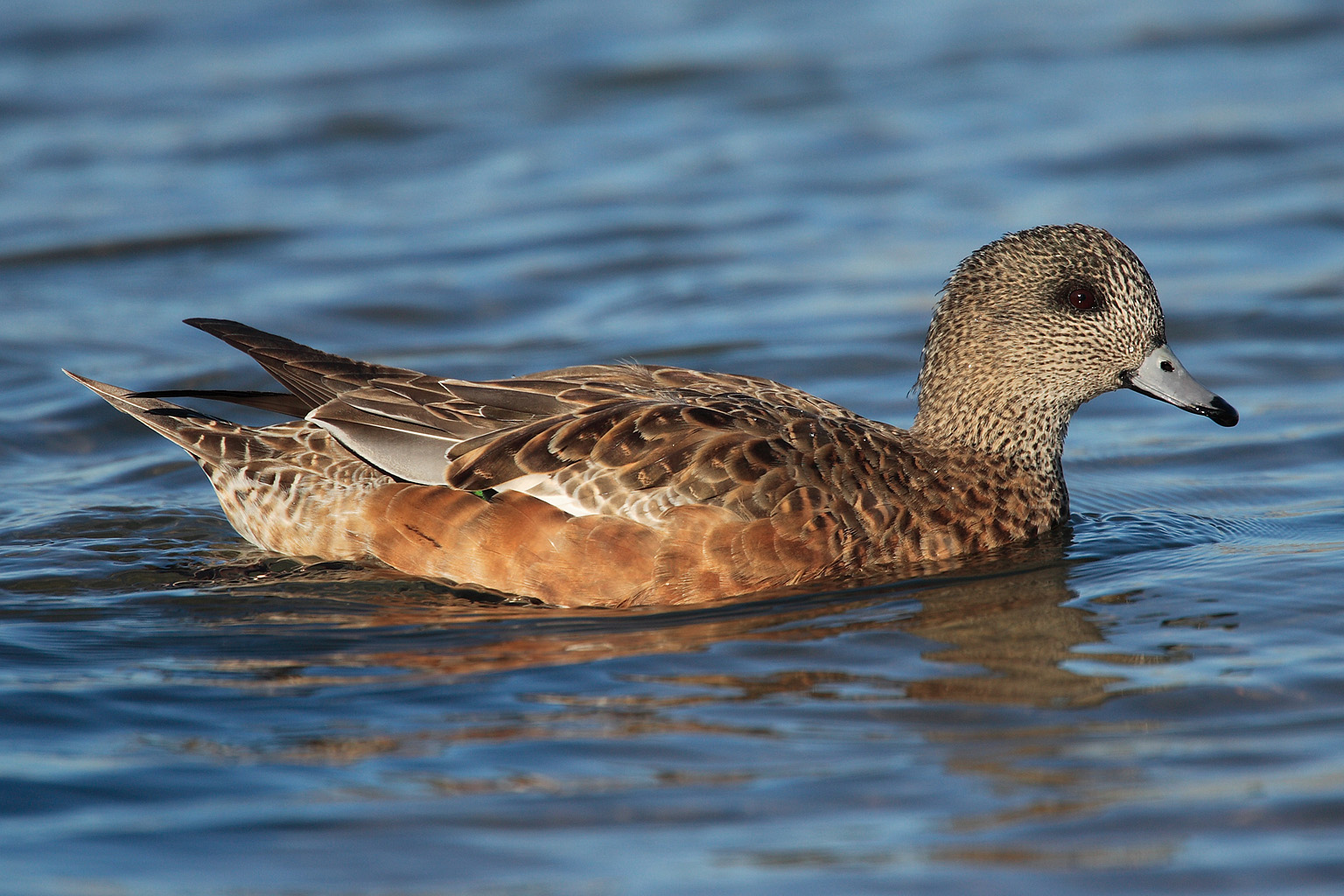
American wigeon

The Oregon Department of Fish and Wildlife regularly stocks Todd Lake with brook trout. These are the only game fish found in the lake. The trout average 8 to 10 inches (20 to 25 cm) in length and some reach 15 inches (380 mm).

There are a number of reptiles and amphibians found in and around Todd Lake. Reptiles include the common garter snake and northern alligator lizard. Amphibians include the western toad, Cascade frog, Oregon spotted frog, Pacific chorus frog, Pacific giant salamander, northwestern salamander, Oregon slender salamander, clouded salamander, Dunn's salamander, long-tailed salamander, and rough-skinned newt. The western toad and the Cascade frog are threatened species. Both species are under the protection of the Oregon Department of Fish and Wildlife. It is illegal to harm or collect these species.

The Todd Lake area is also home to over 160 bird species. In the general area of the lake, birdwatchers can see a wide variety of waterfowl, songbirds, forest birds, and birds of prey. Waterfowl include mallards, wood duck, American wigeon, northern shoveler, American coot, Barrow's goldeneye, common merganser, hooded mergansers, and Canada geese. Common shore and wetland birds include American dipper, spotted sandpiper, black tern, double-crested cormorant, great blue heron, and sandhill crane.

The meadows and forest around the lake are home to American goldfinch, Cassin's finch, pine siskin, red crossbill, Brewers sparrow, house sparrow, song sparrow, yellow-rumped warbler, olive-sided flycatcher, Cordilleran flycatcher, Hammond's flycatcher, dusky flycatcher, mountain chickadee, black-capped chickadee, evening grosbeak, dark-eyed junco, western tanager, American robin, western bluebird, mountain bluebird, hermit thrush, Townsend's solitaire, sage thrasher, golden-crowned kinglet, ruby-crowned kinglet, warbling vireo, house wren, cedar waxwing, barn swallow, cliff swallow, and tree swallow. Other forest birds found in the area include northern flicker, Clark's nutcracker, red-breasted nuthatch, Brown creeper, brown-headed cowbird, pinyon jay, Steller's jay, Brewer's blackbird, common raven, and California quail. Local woodpecker species include American three-toed woodpecker, downy woodpecker, Pileated woodpecker, and hairy woodpecker. There are also two hummingbird species found in the area, Rufous hummingbirds and Calliope hummingbirds.

The lake also attracts a wide variety of birds of prey. There are seven owl species—northern pygmy owl, flammulated owl, boreal owl, spotted owl, barn owl, great gray owl, and great horned owl. There are also American kestrels, peregrine falcons, northern goshawks, Cooper's hawks, red-tailed hawks, osprey, golden eagles, bald eagles, and turkey vultures.

The mixed conifer forest around Todd Lake is home to numerous mammals. The large mammals include black-tailed deer, Roosevelt elk, coyotes, American black bear, bobcats, and cougars. Some of the small mammals found in the Todd Lake area include American badger, North American beaver, mountain beaver, porcupine, raccoon, striped skunk, western spotted skunk, American marten, mink, long-tailed weasel, western gray squirrel, American pika, least chipmunk, Townsend's chipmunk, bushy-tailed woodrat, and deer mouse, as well as several shrew and vole species. There are also three bat species that live near Todd Lake.

== Recreation ==
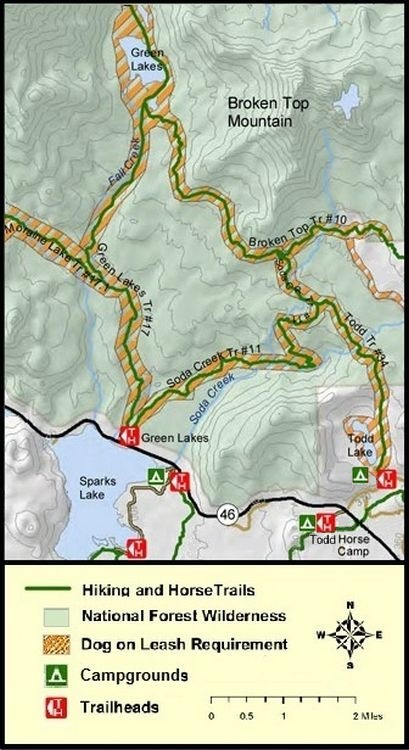
Trail network from Todd Lake

Today, Todd Lake is a very popular recreation site. The Forest Service carefully manages the area in order to provide recreational opportunities for visitors while ensuring that the sensitive lake environment is protected. During the summer, the lake is a favorite place for picnicking, swimming, fishing, hiking, and nature viewing. No motorized boats are allowed on the lake, so watercraft use is limited to canoes, kayaks, rafts, inner tubes, and other non-motorized craft. There is a day-use area and a rustic campground on the west shore of the lake. The day-use facilities include picnic tables, fire pits, and a vault toilet. The campground has three tent-only campsites and a vault toilet. There is no potable water at the lake. From May through September, the Forest Service charges a modest fee for using the Todd Lake recreation area.

There are also a variety of trails near the lake for hiking and horseback riding. Because Todd Lake is located just outside the Three Sisters Wilderness, it is a major access point for hikers and campers heading into the wilderness. The trailhead for Todd Trail #34 is located at the south end of the lake. Todd Trail connects to Soda Creek Trail #11 from Sparks Lake. It then joins Broken Top Trail #10 running along the south side of Broken Top to Green Lakes Trail #17, which leads north to the Green Lakes at the base of the South Sister. During the summer, dogs must be kept on a leash when hiking on trails in the Three Sisters Wilderness, including all the trails mentioned above. The leash rules also apply to the Todd Lake day-use area, campground, and the trail that follows the shore around the lake.

In the winter, the highway to Todd Lake is closed due to snow. However, the trails around Todd Lake are very popular routes for cross-country skiing and snowshoeing. The closest road access is from the Mount Bachelor Nordic Center or Dutchman Sno-park, which are both near Mount Bachelor ski area, approximately 1.8 miles (2.9 km) east of the lake.

== See also ==
- List of lakes in Oregon
