= Doris Lake =

Lake in Oregon, United States

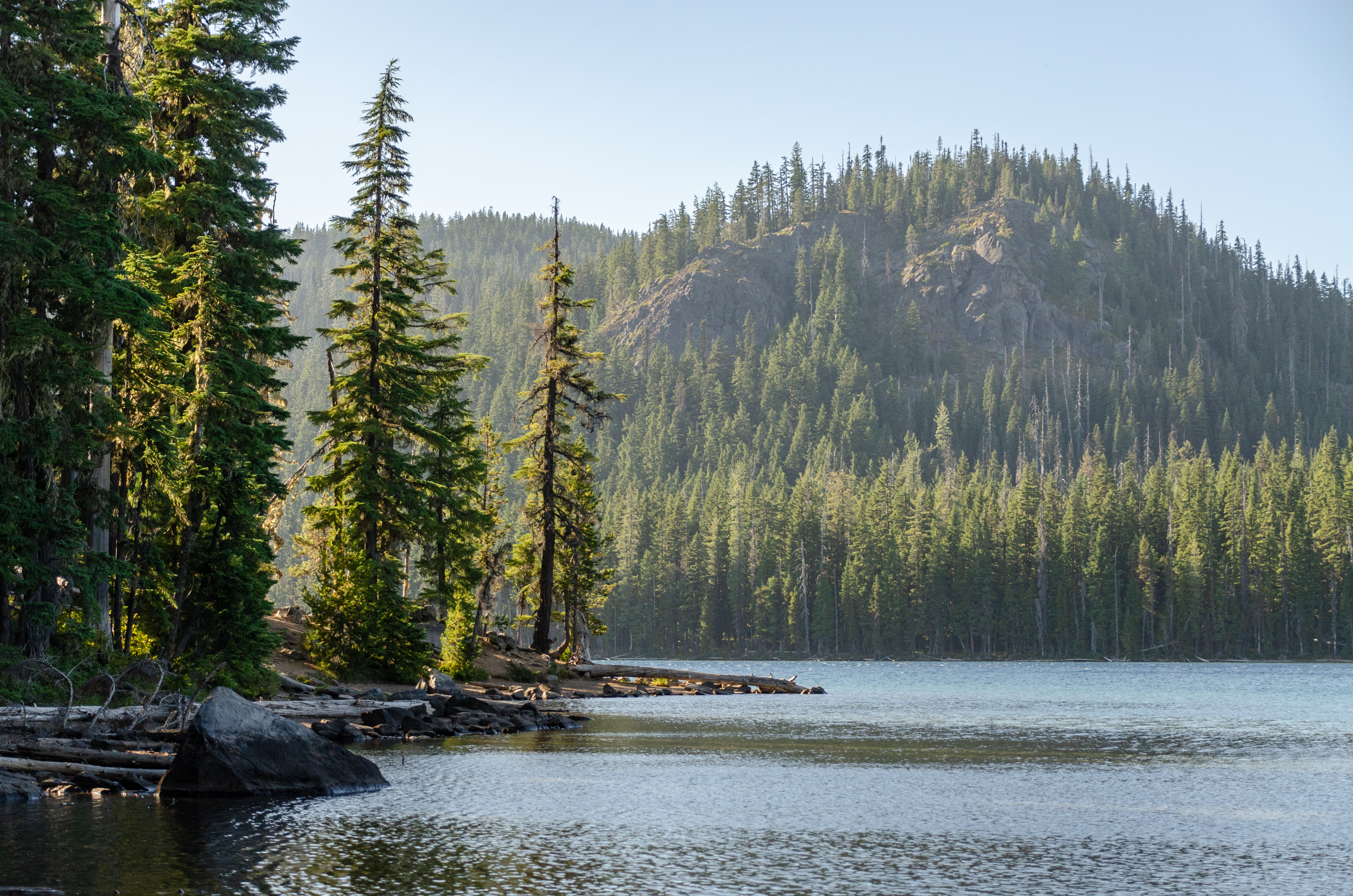
- Late afternoon light on Doris Lake

- Location within Oregon Location within the United States
- Location: Deschutes County, Oregon
- Coordinates: 43°57′03″N 121°50′33″W
- Lake type: Natural, ultraoligotrophic
- Catchment area: 1.1 square miles (2.8 km^{2})
- Basin countries: United States
- Surface area: 69 acres (28 ha)
- Average depth: 24 feet (7.3 m)
- Max. depth: 95 feet (29 m)
- Water volume: 1,600 acre-feet (2.0×10^{6} m^{3})
- Residence time: 1.4 years
- Shore length^{1}: 1.7 miles (2.7 km)
- Surface elevation: 5,308 feet (1,618 m)
- Settlements: Bend
- ^{1} Shore length is not a well-defined measure.

Doris Lake is a natural body of water in the Three Sisters Wilderness of the central Cascade Range in the U.S. state of Oregon. At 5,300 feet (1,600 m) above sea level, the lake is part of a volcanic landscape 27 miles (43 km) southwest of Bend and about 3 miles (5 km) by trail west of the Cascade Lakes Scenic Byway.

Doris Lake is west-southwest of Blow Lake and Elk Lake in the Deschutes National Forest. Other nearby lakes include Senoj and Leech. Doris Lake lies slightly east of the Lane County border and the Mink Lake Basin.

The lake is up to 95 feet (29 m) deep in a small basin carved by Pleistocene glaciers. No perennial streams enter or leave the lake, which is thought to gain and lose water through seepage.

== Recreation ==
The Six Lakes Trail, which runs by Doris Lake, connects the scenic byway to the east with the Pacific Crest Trail to the west. The trail offers opportunities for day hikes, backpacking, and horse riding.

Brook trout, stocked annually in the lake, grow to 14 inches (36 cm) here. Fishing is said to be "fair". Much of the lake is difficult to fish without a raft or float tube brought in along the trail.

== See also ==
- List of lakes in Oregon
