= Elmer Davis Lake =

- Location within Kentucky
- Location: Owen County, Kentucky
- Coordinates: 38°29′54″N 84°52′26″W
- Type: reservoir
- Primary inflows: Severn Creek
- Primary outflows: Severn Creek
- Basin countries: United States
- Surface area: 149 acres (60 ha)
- Average depth: 21 ft (6.4 m)
- Max. depth: 59 ft (18 m)
- Surface elevation: 721 ft (220 m)

Elmer Davis Lake is a 149-acre (0.60 km^{2}) reservoir in Owen County, Kentucky. It was created in 1958 by the Kentucky Department of Fish and Wildlife Resources, and was named for a former commissioner of that department.
