= Little Cultus Lake =

Lake in Oregon, United States

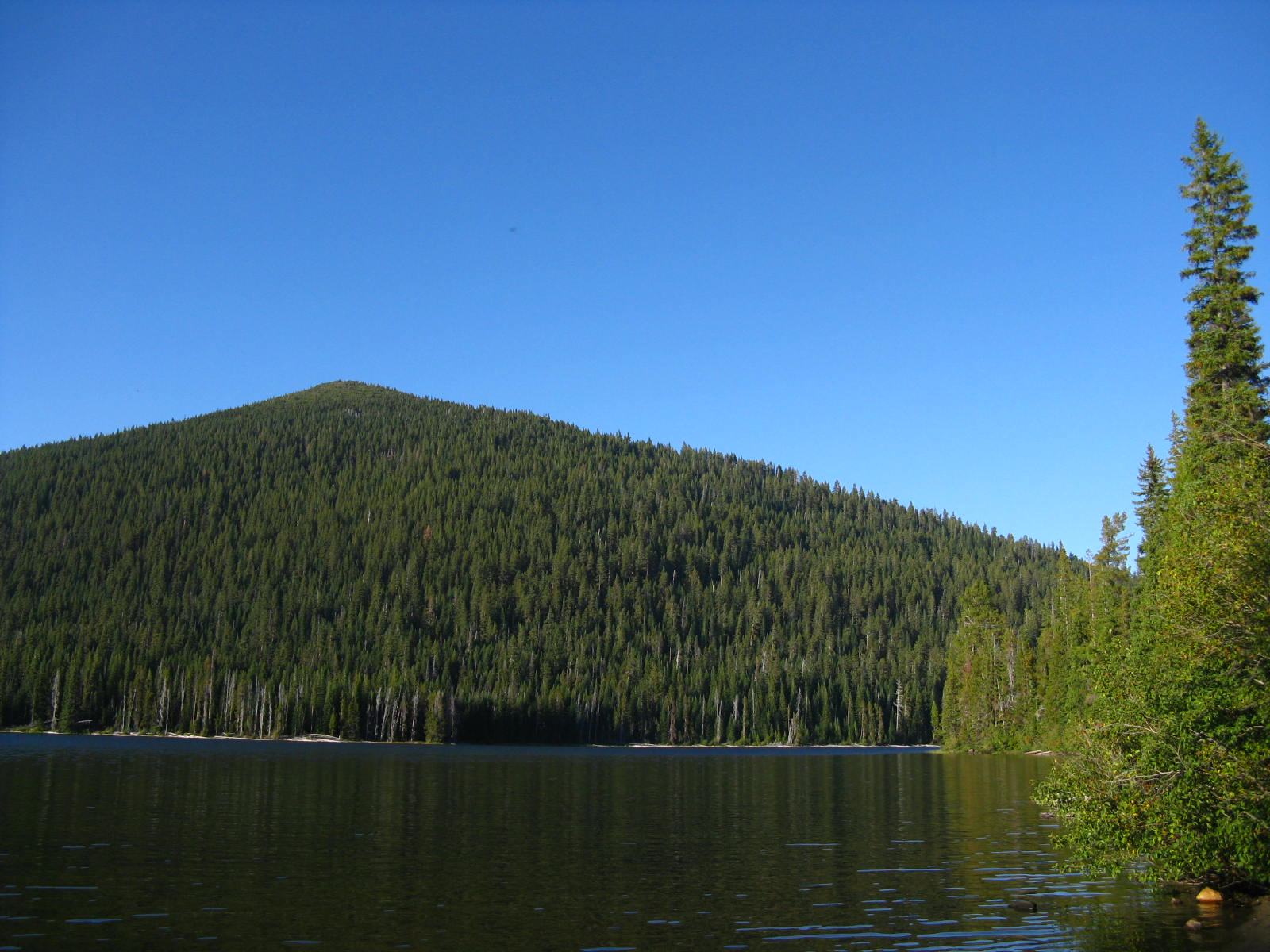
- Little Cultus Lake

- Location within Oregon Location within the United States
- Location: Deschutes County, Oregon
- Coordinates: 43.803°N 121.873°W
- Basin countries: United States
- Max. length: 1 mi (1.6 km)
- Max. width: 0.25 mi (0.40 km)
- Surface area: 170 acres (69 ha)
- Max. depth: 60 ft (18 m)
- Shore length^{1}: 15,275 ft (4,656 m)
- Surface elevation: 4,768 ft (1,453 m)
- ^{1} Shore length is not a well-defined measure.

Little Cultus Lake is a natural lake in Deschutes County, Oregon, United States. Near its larger and more popular twin Cultus Lake to the north on the other side of Cultus Mountain, it is located in the Deschutes National Forest in the Cascade Range. Like Cultus Lake, it is named after the Chinook Jargon word "cultus", meaning "in vain" or "worthless".

== Location ==
Little Cultus Lake is located a little more than 2 miles (3.2 km) directly south of Cultus Lake, and 50 miles (80 km) southwest of Bend. It is located off of the Cascade Lakes Scenic Byway, which winds through the terrain featuring similar natural lakes.

== Activities ==
Little Cultus Lake is known for its fishing of Rainbow trout and brook trout, the latter of which was stocked by the Oregon Department of Fish and Wildlife until in 1997. Fly fishing, bank fishing, and trolling are the most common fishing methods on the lake. Since the brook trout are no longer stocked, they are a bit more rare than the rainbows. They are usually 8 to 12 inches (20 to 30 cm) but are occasionally as long as 16 inches (41 cm).

Little Cultus Lake has a campground with 31 campsites, as well as a paved boat launch. It is located toward the southeast side of the lake.

To aid the fishing experience, Little Cultus Lake has a speed limit of 10 miles per hour (16 kilometres per hour). This also makes fishing in the lake available to people in kayaks or float tubes.

== See also ==
- List of lakes in Oregon
