= Davis Lake volcanic field =

Volcanic field in Oregon, United States

- Volcanic field
- Lava flow at the north end of Davis Lake
- Interactive map of Davis Lake volcanic field
- Location: Deschutes / Klamath counties, Oregon, U.S.
- Range: Cascades
- Age: Holocene
- Geology: Scoria cones, lava flows
- Volcanic arc: Cascade Volcanic Arc
- Last eruption: ~ 3000–3500 BCE

The Davis Lake volcanic field is a volcanic field consisting of a group of three young cinder cones and their associated andesitic lava flows. The field is located just east of the crest of the Cascade Range in Oregon, United States. The northernmost lava flow created Davis Lake by blocking Odell Creek.

== Other nearby volcanoes ==
Name	Elevation	Coordinates
Davis Mountain	6,624 ft (2,019 m)	43°37′45″N 121°46′00″W
Odell Butte	7,011 ft (2,137 m)	43°28′15″N 121°51′50″W

== See also ==
- List of volcanoes in the United States of America
- List of volcanic fields
- Cascade Volcanoes
- Davis Lake
