= North and South Twin Lakes (Oregon) =

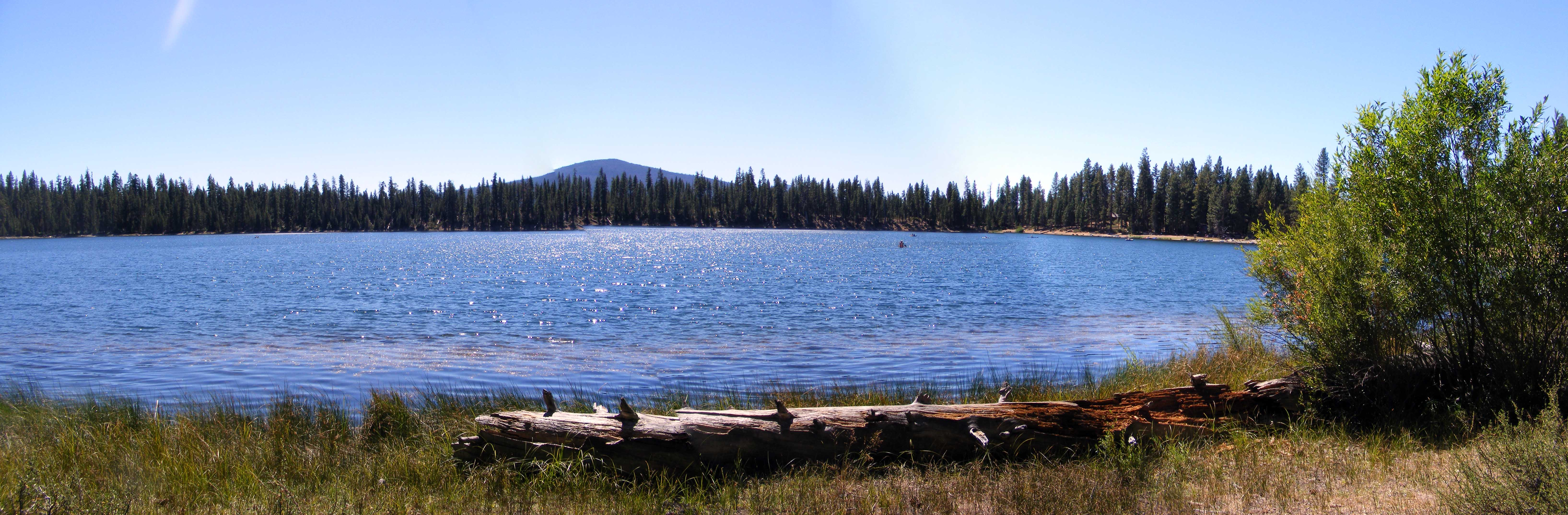
- Interactive map of North and South Twin Lakes
- Location: Deschutes County, Oregon
- Coordinates: 43°43′15″N 121°45′49″W
- Type: Natural lakes
- Basin countries: United States
- Surface area: 112 acres (45 ha) North; 99 acres (40 ha) South
- Average depth: 40 ft (12.2 m) North; 33 ft (10.1 m) South
- Max. depth: 60 ft (18.3 m) North; 58 ft (17.7 m). South
- Surface elevation: 4,340 ft (1,322.8 m), North; 4,334 ft (1,321.0 m). South

North and South Twin Lakes are two nearly identical natural lakes in Deschutes County, Oregon. Both were formed around 20,000 years ago when a rising magma reservoir reached groundwater, creating violent steam explosions. Two craters were formed, later filling with water.

North Twin Lake has an elevation of 4,340 feet (1,322.8 m), while South Twin Lake is 6 feet (1.8 m) lower, at 4,334 feet (1,321.0 m). North is larger, having a surface area of 112 acres (45 ha), compared to South's 99 acres (40 ha). North is also deeper, with an average depth of 40 feet (12.2 m) and a maximum depth of 60 feet (18.3 m). South is shallower, with an average depth of 33 feet (10.1 m) and a maximum depth of 58 feet (17.7 m).

In 1987, the Oregon Department of Fish and Wildlife poisoned South Twin Lake to remove rough fish. The lake is stocked with fingerlings and rainbow trout. North Twin Lake was illegally stocked with catfish some time before 2008. The largest recorded rainbow trout caught from South Twin Lake weighed over 13.5 pounds (6.1 kg). The trout average 10 to 14 inches (25 to 36 cm) long, with 18-inch (46 cm) fish common.

The Twin Lakes have surprisingly calm winds compared to other Cascade Lakes. South Twin Lake is completely tree-lined except for the beach day-use area. Water levels vary little over the season. The lake is rich with weedbeds.

== See also ==
- List of lakes in Oregon
- Maar
