= Cascade Lakes Scenic Byway =

Byway in Oregon

Forest Route 46
- Cascade Lakes Scenic Byway
- Cascade lakes Scenic Byway highlighted in red

Route information
- Maintained by Oregon Department of Transportation
- Length: 66 mi (106 km)
- Restrictions: Closed December–March

Major junctions
- North end: US 97 in Bend
- South end: OR 58 40 miles (64 km) southeast of Oakridge

Location
- Country: United States
- State: Oregon
- Counties: Deschutes & Klamath

Highway system
- Forest Highway System; Oregon Highways; Interstate; US; State; Named; Scenic

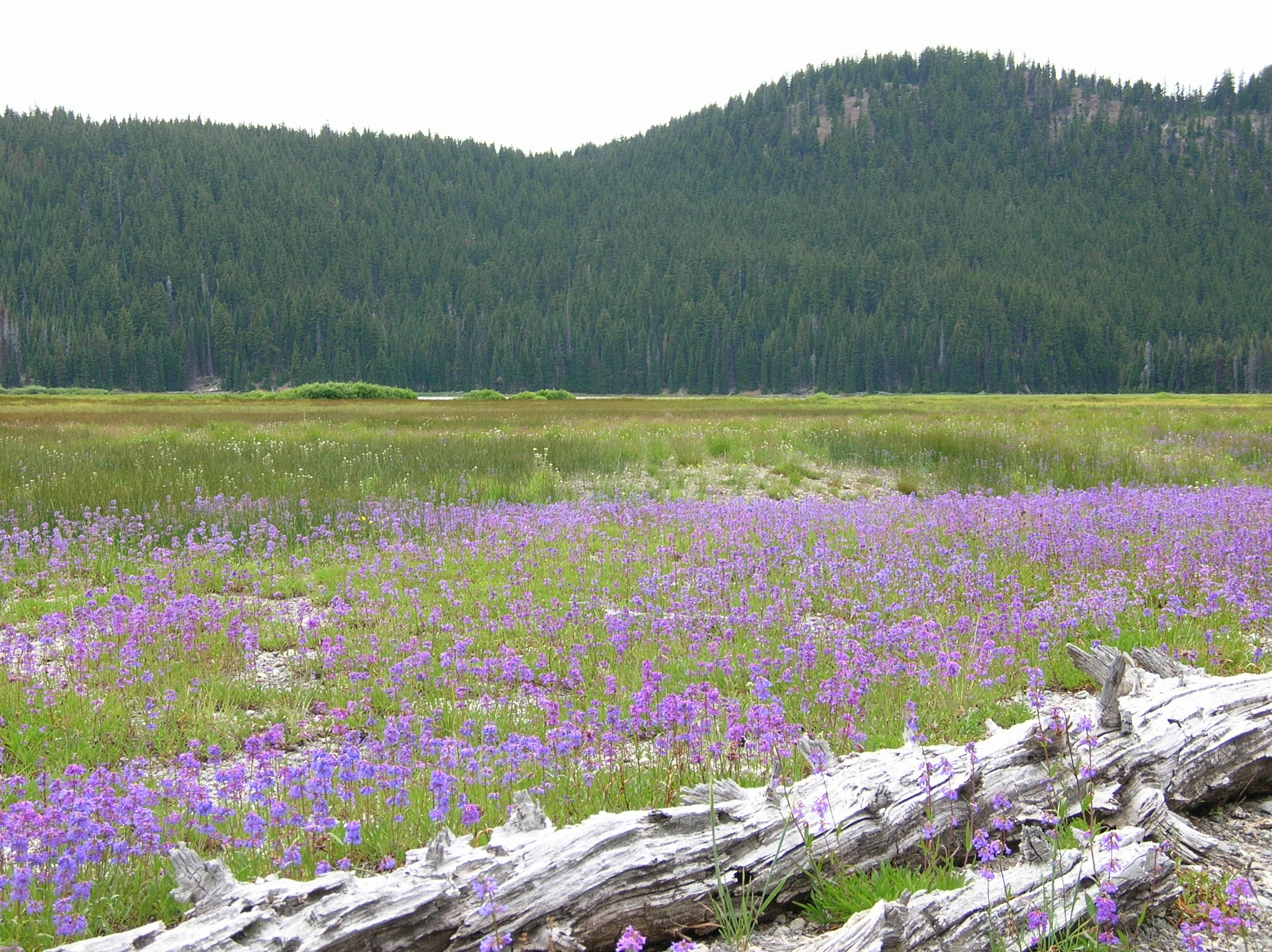
Sparks Meadow in July, 2005

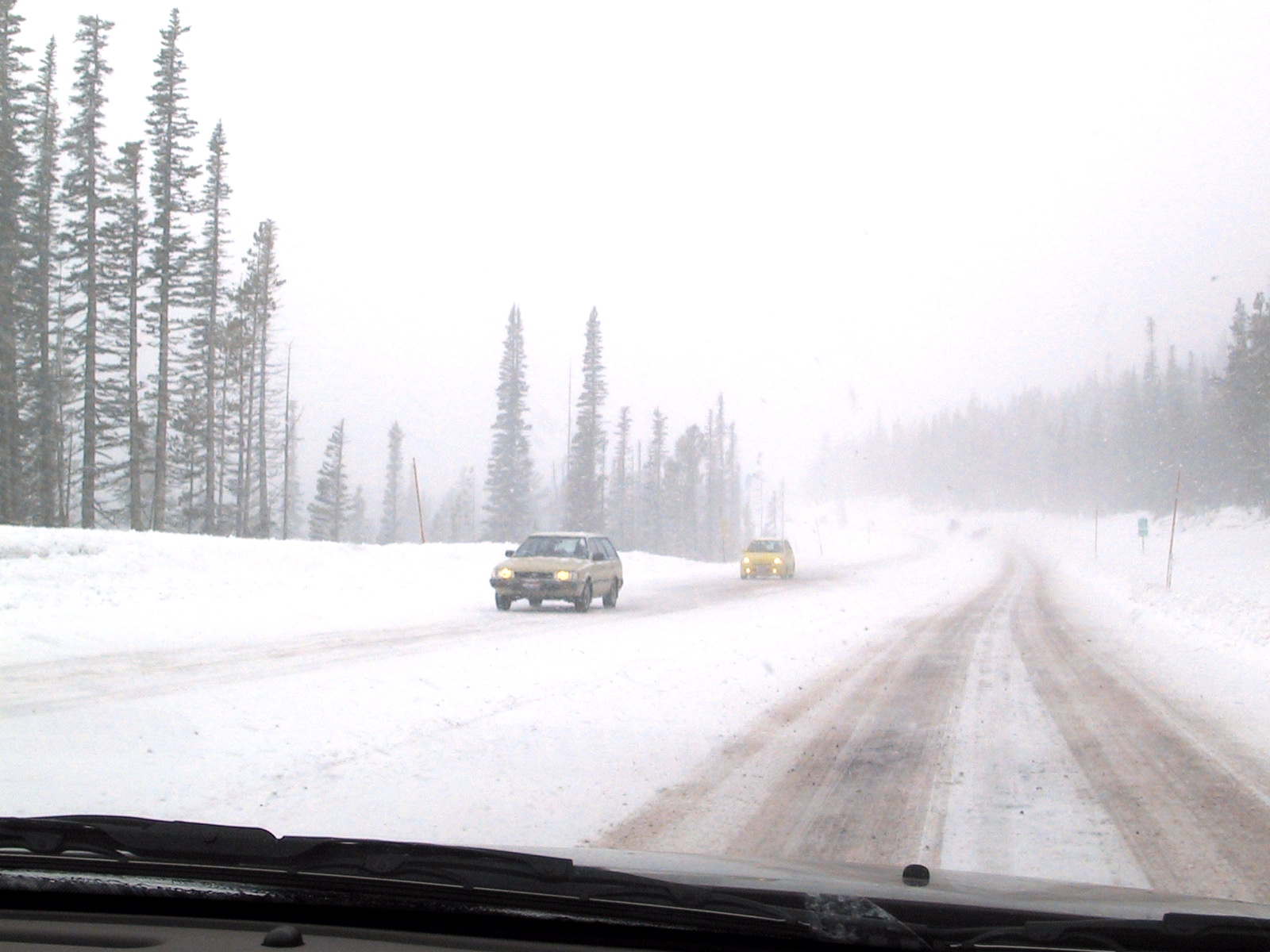
The byway in winter

The Cascades Lakes Scenic Byway (Forest Route 46) is a National Scenic Byway in central Oregon in the United States. It runs for 66 miles (106 km) in the rugged country of Deschutes and Klamath counties on the east side of the Cascade Range. It offers particularly good views of Mount Bachelor, Broken Top, and the Three Sisters (Oregon) mountains and provides access to many recreational facilities in central Oregon. The route is so named because it weaves past a number of small natural lakes along the Cascades as well as several reservoirs on the upper Deschutes River.

== Route description ==
The northern terminus of the route is in Bend, at NW Century Drive. It follows the two-lane Century Drive Highway south out of the city, then west into the Deschutes National Forest and past the Mt. Bachelor Ski Area, then south along the Cascades into northern Klamath County, where it terminates on its southern end at its junction with Oregon Route 58, approximately 40 mi (64 km) southeast of Oakridge. Along the way, Century Drive (not the Century Drive Highway) turns east to Sunriver.

Originally named Century Drive, begins at an interchange with US 97 (the Bend Parkway) in Bend. It heads west along Colorado Avenue and Century Drive, which it follows to the entrance to the Mount Bachelor Ski Resort, where Century Drive Highway ends. It was named Century Drive when it was paved with red volcanic rock for Oregon's centennial.

The Cascade Lakes Scenic Byway continues south along the west side of Mount Bachelor. Beyond Mount Bachelor Ski Area, the byway passes Todd Lake, Sparks Lake, Devils Lake, Elk Lake, Hosmer Lake, Lava Lake, Little Lava Lake, and Cultus Lake. South of Crane Prairie Reservoir, the two routes split, with the scenic byway continuing to head south towards its terminus at Oregon Route 58. Century Drive instead heads back to the east, north of the Wickiup Reservoir, and then heads northeast parallel to the western shore of the Deschutes River. It eventually crosses the river, runs north for several miles, and then terminates at an intersection with US 97 near the resort community of Sunriver.
