= Davis Lake =

Lake in Oregon, United States of America

- Davis Lake & lava flow

- Location within Oregon Location within the United States
- Location: Deschutes National Forest, Klamath and Deschutes counties, Oregon
- Coordinates: 43°36′57″N 121°50′39″W
- Lake type: Natural, mesotrophic
- Primary inflows: Odell Creek; Ranger Creek
- Primary outflows: Seepage
- Catchment area: 118 square miles (310 km^{2})
- Basin countries: United States
- Surface area: 1,000 to 3,906 acres (405 to 1,581 ha)
- Average depth: 9 ft (2.7 m)
- Max. depth: 22 ft (6.7 m)
- Water volume: 35,940 acre-feet (44,330,000 m^{3})
- Residence time: 4 months
- Surface elevation: 4,386 ft (1,337 m)

Davis Lake straddles the border between Deschutes County and Klamath County in the U.S. state of Oregon. A relatively large and shallow lake in the Deschutes National Forest, it is located toward the south end of the Cascade Lakes Scenic Byway, near Oregon Route 58 and U.S. 97. The lake is known as one of Oregon's best bass lakes.

== History ==
Davis Lake was formed by a lava flow within the nearby volcanic field blocking Odell Creek. The blockage results in the lake, which can cover over 3,000 acres (1,200 ha) acres in the winter months. In the summer, however, the inflow from Odell and Ranger creeks cannot fill up the lake as fast as the water escapes through the lava blockage, resulting in the lake covering a much smaller area. It is unknown where the water goes that escapes through the lava dam.

Davis Lake is known for its fishing. Only fly fishing with artificial flies is permitted. Rainbow trout are planted to assist natural reproduction. The piscivorous trout, native to the lake, feeds on the invasive Tui chub.

In the 1980s and 1990s, years of drought lowered the levels and warmed the waters of the lake, affecting the trout, which thrive during high-water years. In 1995, largemouth bass were illegally put into the lake, feeding off of the smaller trout. Now, the bass population is greater than the trout population.

== Amenities ==
Davis Lake is a fly-fishing lake only. Motors are allowed, and per the 2013 Oregon Sport Fishing Regulations trolling is allowed. Speed is limited to 10 mph (16 km/h). There is boat ramp located on the west side of Odell Creek and at South Davis Campground higher up Odell Creek. Boat launching at Lava Flow campground is also an option. There are three campgrounds on the shores of the lake—one each on the west and east sides, and one near the lava flow—which comprise 70 individual campsites. All three campgrounds provide firepits, picnic tables, and toilets, and the east and west side campgrounds provide water.

== See also ==
- Lake Davis
- List of lakes in Oregon
