= Sparks Lake =

Lake in Oregon, United States

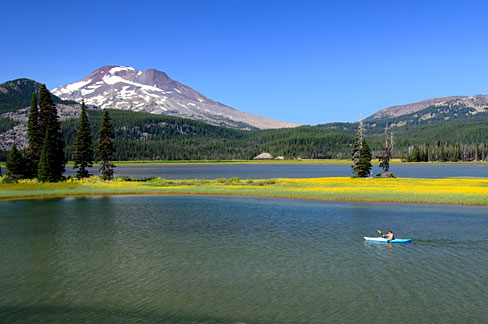
- Sparks Lake and South Sister

- Location within Oregon Location within the United States
- Location: Deschutes County, Oregon
- Coordinates: 44°00′56″N 121°44′43″W
- Type: Natural, oligotrophic, with dam
- Primary inflows: Goose, Fall, and Soda creeks
- Catchment area: 37 square miles (96 km^{2})
- Basin countries: United States
- Surface area: 779 acres (315 ha)
- Average depth: 1 foot (0.3 m)
- Max. depth: 7 feet (2 m)
- Water volume: 1,000 acre-feet (1,200,000 m^{3})
- Shore length^{1}: 10 miles (16 km)
- Surface elevation: 5,433 feet (1,656 m)
- Settlements: Bend
- ^{1} Shore length is not a well-defined measure.

Sparks Lake is a natural body of water near the crest of the central Cascade Range in Deschutes County in the U.S. state of Oregon. The lake is about 26 miles (42 km) west-southwest of Bend along the Cascade Lakes Scenic Byway in Deschutes National Forest. Named for a 19th-century rancher, "Lige" Sparks, the water body is a remnant of a bigger lake that has partly filled with sediment and vegetation.

Many of the region's mountain peaks, such as Mount Bachelor, Three Sisters, and Broken Top, are visible from the lake. Other lakes in the vicinity include Todd, Elk, Hosmer, Blow, and Doris.

== Hydrology ==
Sparks lake lies in a closed basin formed by lava flows of the Three Sisters and Mt. Bachelor volcanic systems which occurred in the early Holocene or late Pleistocene eras. Sparks Lake is fed by snow melt from South Sister and Broken Top mountains. While Sparks Lake has no visible outflow into the Deschutes River basin, the lake can be observed flowing into crevasses and outcrops along the South West shores. The waters of Sparks Lake likely feed springs in the tributaries above Crane Prairie Reservoir

== Recreation ==
The United States Forest Service maintains a boat launch at Sparks Lake. The site has a parking area, a lake trail, and dispersed camping at locations accessible by boat. A more formal campground run by the Forest Service is nearby along Soda Creek.

Sparks Lake supports populations of brook trout and stocked cutthroat trout. Fly fishing is the only kind of angling allowed on the lake. Motorboats may be used for transportation, but fishing is allowed from them only when their motors are turned off.

== See also ==
- List of lakes in Oregon
