= Williamson Mountain =

Mountain peak in Oregon

- Location within Oregon

Highest point
- Elevation: 6,304 ft (1,921 m) NGVD 29
- Prominence: 1,024 ft (312 m)
- Coordinates: 43°55′25″N 121°49′29″W

Geography
- Location: Deschutes County, Oregon, U.S.
- Parent range: Cascades
- Topo map: USGS Elk Lake

Geology
- Mountain type: Shield volcano
- Last eruption: Pleistocene

Climbing
- Easiest route: Hiking

Williamson Mountain, elevation 6,304 feet (1,921 m), is a peak in the Cascade Range in the U.S. state of Oregon. It is named after Lt. Robert S. Williamson, who with Lt. Philip Sheridan took part in the Pacific Railroad Surveys in central Oregon in 1855. The United States Board on Geographic Names approved the name in 1931. Before that, the peak was known by its Chinook Jargon name of Leloo Mountain (Wolf Mountain), derived from the French le loup (the wolf).

The mountain lies slightly east of the border between Lane County and Deschutes County in the Deschutes National Forest and the Three Sisters Wilderness, southwest of Mount Bachelor. The Six Lakes Trail crosses the mountain between Lucky Lake to the southeast and Senoj Lake to the northwest. Forest Road 46 (Lava Lake Road) is about 2 miles (3.2 km) east of the mountain.
