= Devils Lake (Deschutes County, Oregon) =

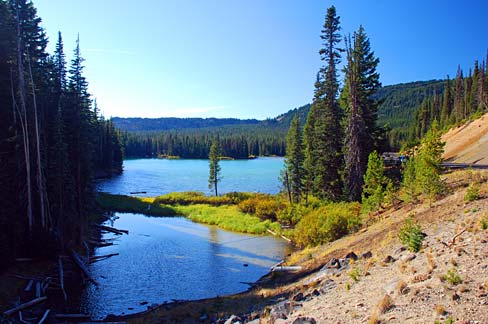

- Location within Oregon Location within the United States
- Location: Deschutes County, Oregon
- Coordinates: 44°02′04″N 121°45′42″W
- Type: natural freshwater lake
- Basin countries: United States
- Max. length: 1,540 feet (470 m)
- Max. width: 920 feet (280 m)
- Surface area: 23 acres (9.3 ha)
- Average depth: 3 feet (0.91 m)
- Max. depth: 10 feet (3.0 m)
- Surface elevation: 5,446 feet (1,660 m)

Devils Lake is a shallow, 23 acre lake located in Deschutes County, Oregon, along the Cascade Lakes Scenic Byway and found at an elevation of 5,446 feet (1,660 m). The lake is named for the "devilishly" green or blue hue to its water.
