= Crane Prairie Reservoir =

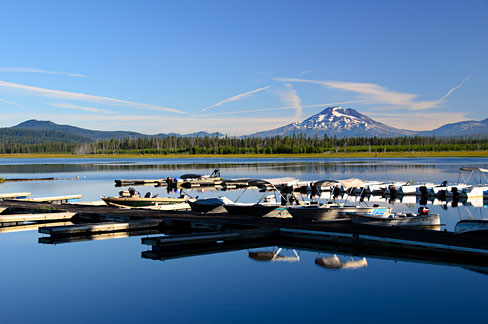
- Crane Prairie Reservoir

- Location of Crane Prairie Reservoir in Oregon, USA. Crane Prairie Reservoir (the United States)
- Location: Deschutes County, Oregon
- Coordinates: 43°46′50″N 121°48′02″W
- Type: Reservoir
- Primary inflows: Deschutes River
- Primary outflows: Deschutes River
- Catchment area: 185 mi^{2} (480 km^{2})
- Basin countries: United States
- Designation: Wildlife Management Area within the Deschutes National Forest
- Built: 1922, 1940
- Surface area: 3,420 acres (1,380 ha)
- Average depth: 15.5 ft (4.7 m)
- Max. depth: 20 ft (6.1 m)
- Water volume: 55,300 acre⋅ft (68,200,000 m^{3})
- Shore length^{1}: 22 mi (35 km)
- Surface elevation: 4,452 ft (1,357 m)
- ^{1} Shore length is not a well-defined measure.

Crane Prairie Reservoir is a man-made lake located about 42 miles (68 km) southwest of Bend in Deschutes County, Oregon, United States. The reservoir is named for the cranes that thrive in its habitat and for the upper Deschutes River prairie that once covered the area before the dam on the Deschutes was constructed in 1922. Eighteen years later, in 1940, the dam was rebuilt by the Bureau of Reclamation. The reservoir now serves as one of Oregon's largest rainbow trout fisheries. The heaviest fish ever caught in the lake was a 19-pound (8.6 kg) trout.

The Deschutes River, which originates at Little Lava Lake, flows south for 8.4 miles (13.5 km) to Crane Prairie Reservoir. The river leaves the reservoir via the dam and continues south to Wickiup Reservoir.

== See also ==
- List of lakes in Oregon
