= Cultus Lake (Oregon) =

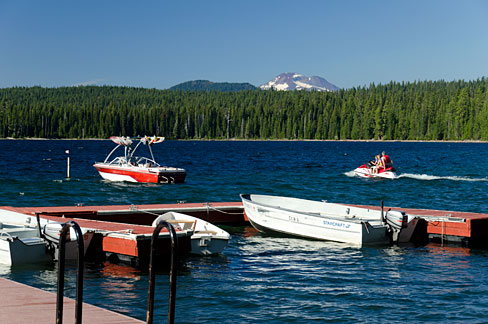
- Cultus Lake boat dock

- Location within Oregon Location within the United States
- Location: Deschutes County, Oregon
- Coordinates: 43°50′16″N 121°51′36″W
- Type: Natural lake
- Basin countries: United States
- Max. length: 2 mi (3.2 km)
- Surface area: 1,145.7 acres (4.636 km^{2})
- Max. depth: 211 ft (64 m)
- Shore length^{1}: 8.1 mi (13.0 km)
- Surface elevation: 4,672 ft (1,424 m)
- ^{1} Shore length is not a well-defined measure.

Cultus Lake is a natural lake in Deschutes County in the U.S. state of Oregon. Formed by a glacier, it is located in the high Cascade Range in the Deschutes National Forest. The name is from the Chinook Jargon and means variously bad or worthless, or simply "in vain". In the early 19th century, the lakes in this area abounded with beavers. The earliest explorers to this area were primarily on a quest for furs.

== Description ==
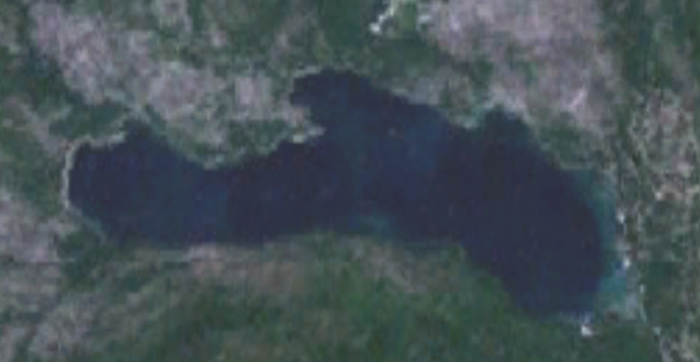
Satellite image of Cultus Lake

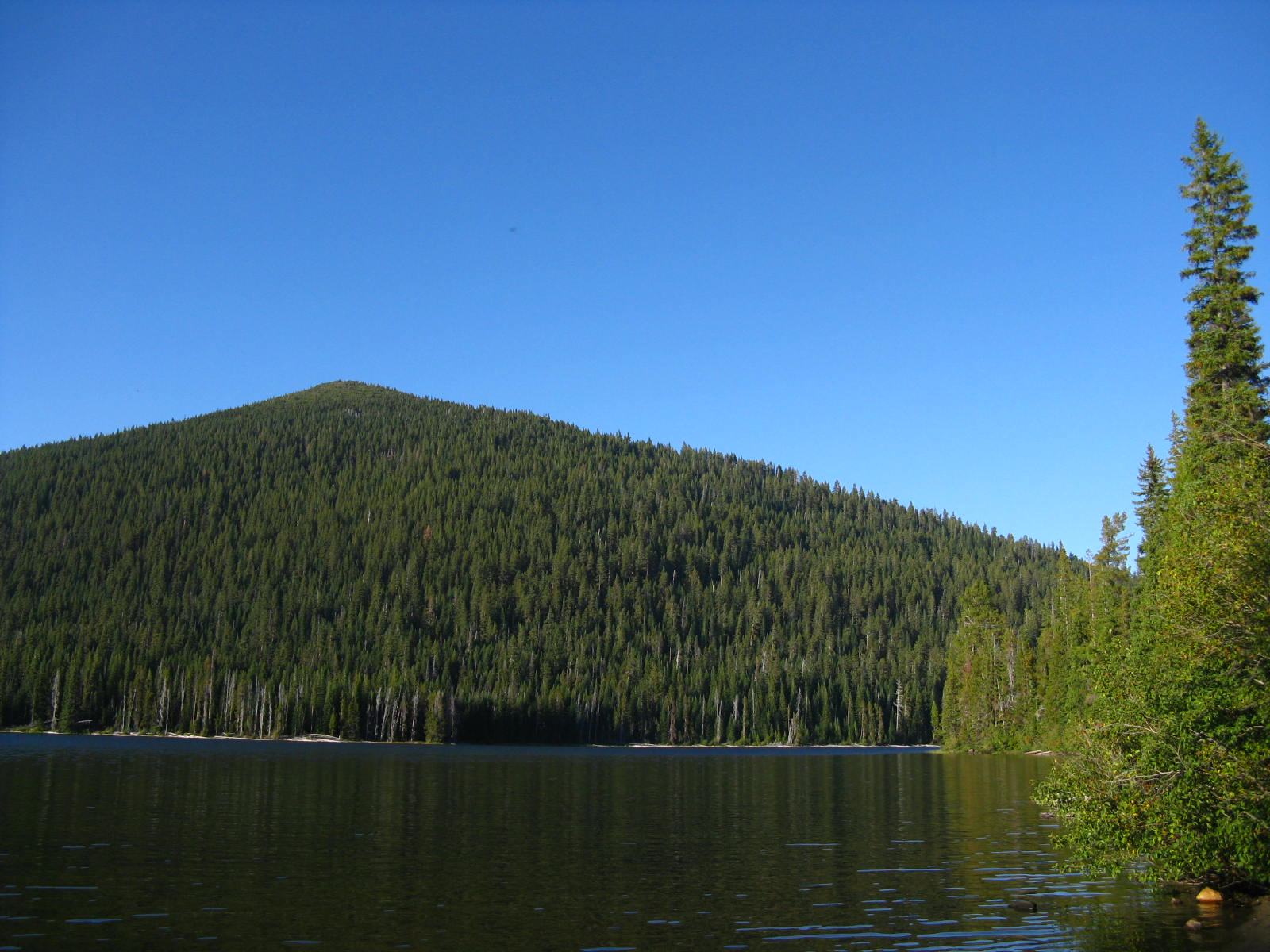
Cultus Mountain seen from Little Cultus Lake

Cultus Lake lies at the base of the Cultus Mountain. The lake itself is natural and is 211 feet (64 m) at its deepest point and about 2 miles (3.2 km) long. Several species of fish inhabit the lake, including rainbow trout, lake trout (mackinaw) and brook trout.

The lake also receives several streams inhabited by younger fish. The largest is Winopee Creek, which enters through the marsh on the northwestern side, a popular fly fishing spot. Two miles south is a smaller lake called Little Cultus Lake. The two lakes are divided by Cultus Mountain. The lake empties to the east via Cultus Creek, which flows into Crane Prairie Reservoir.

The area around Cultus Lake is known for its large ponderosa pine, Douglas-fir and western white pine, sometimes rising to 120 feet (37 m) tall. However, according to the U.S. Fish and Wildlife Service, the large pines are being weakened by competing understory fir trees and mountain pine beetle attacks. If the trend is not reversed, there will be a shift in tree species (and tree size) from pine and Douglas-fir to white fir.

The service recommends the selective thinning of white fir understory trees around selected ponderosa and western white pine to increase light, and the availability of nutrients, allowing the selected pines to grow more vigorously and increase their resistance to bark beetles.

== Management policies ==
The Oregon Department of Fish and Wildlife manages the lake for the natural and hatchery production of rainbow trout and brook trout. They also manage the natural production of Mountain Whitefish and lake trout.

== Amenities ==
Cultus is a recreational lake and is also popular for water skiing, sailing, jet skiing and boating.

The lake has a resort with 23 cabins and a lodge with a restaurant and a store. There are also three other campsites for people to set up tents or park RVs.

== See also ==
- List of lakes in Oregon
