= Lava Lake (Oregon) =

Lake in the United States

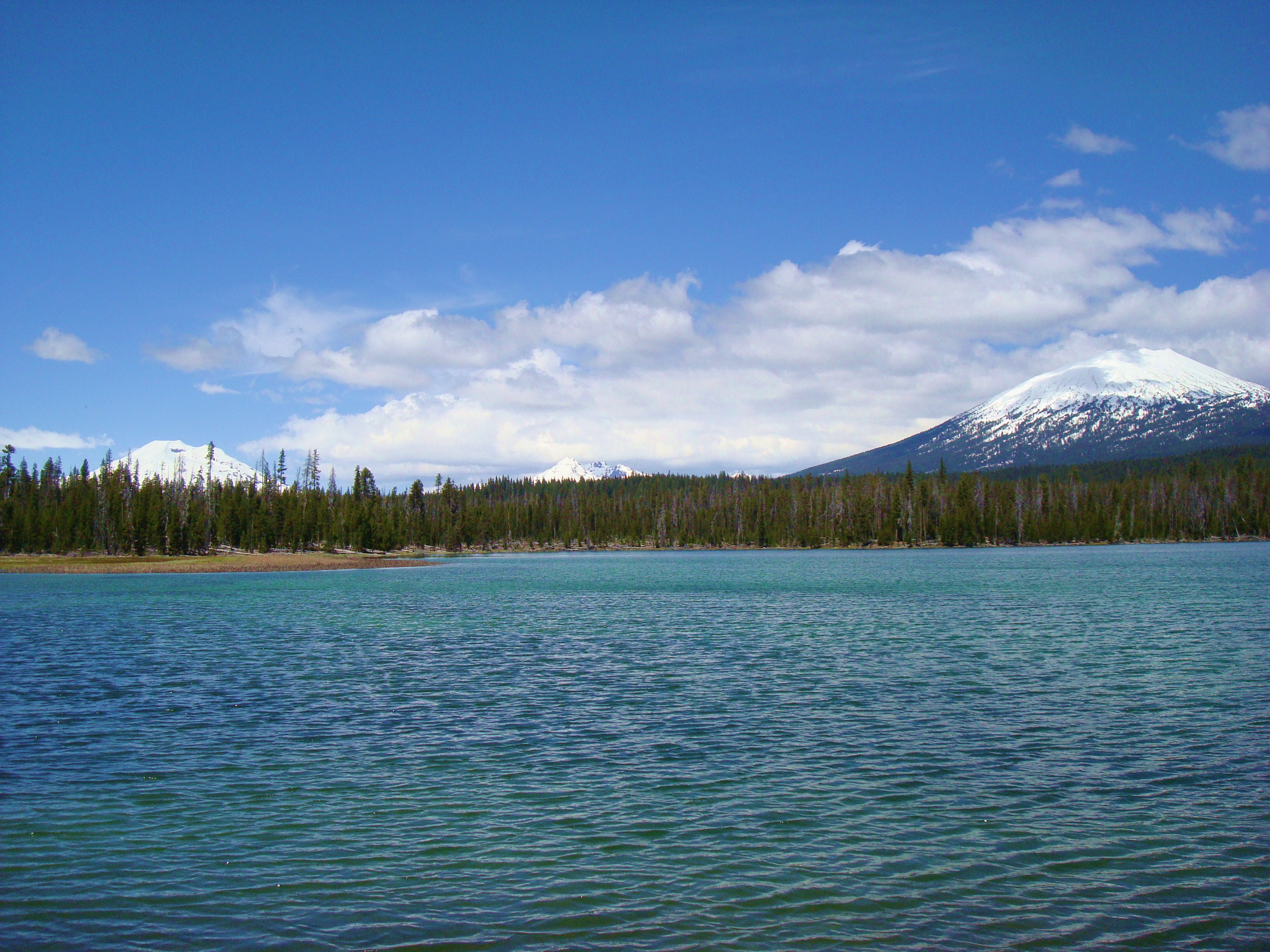
- View east across the lake

- Location within Oregon Location within the United States
- Location: Deschutes County, Oregon
- Coordinates: 43°55′13″N 121°46′22″W
- Type: Volcanogenic, oligotrophic
- Primary inflows: seeps and springs
- Primary outflows: none usually but some to Little Lava Lake during high water
- Catchment area: 8 square miles (21 km^{2})
- Basin countries: United States
- Surface area: 368 acres (149 ha)
- Average depth: 20 feet (6.1 m)
- Max. depth: 34 feet (10 m)
- Water volume: 7,200 acre-feet (8,900,000 m^{3})
- Residence time: 1.3 years
- Shore length^{1}: 3.3 miles (5.3 km)
- Surface elevation: 4,740 feet (1,440 m)
- ^{1} Shore length is not a well-defined measure.

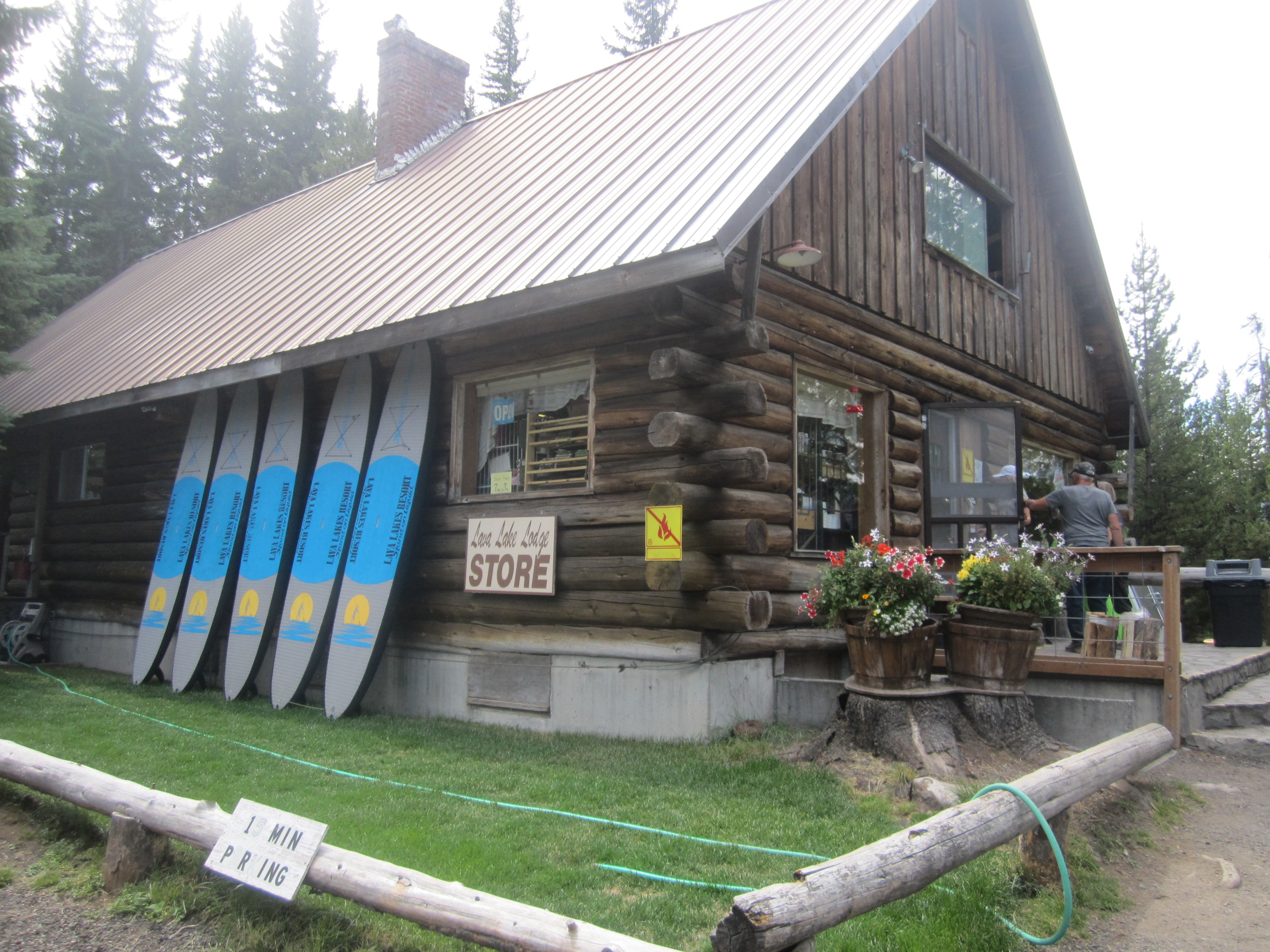
Lava Lake store and lodge

Lava Lake lies in the Cascade Range about 25 miles (40 km) west-southwest of Bend in the U.S. state of Oregon. It is a close neighbor of Little Lava Lake, from which it is separated by solidified lava. Lava Lake is at an elevation of 4,740 feet (1,440 m) in the Deschutes National Forest. The lake covers 368 acres (149 ha) to an average depth of 20 feet (6.1 m).

Lava Lake, Little Lava Lake, and other nearby lakes are volcanogenic, having formed after lava flows from Mount Bachelor altered drainage patterns in the area. Solidified lava flows are visible along the shorelines of both lakes, and the volcanic peaks Broken Top and South Sister can be seen to the north.

== Recreation ==
Fish in the lake include rainbow trout that grow to 24 inches (61 cm) and brook trout that sometimes reach 19 inches (48 cm). Controlled populations of tui chub also live in the lake.

A United States Forest Service campground and a private resort are near the lake, and Little Lava Lake also has campsites. Amenities around the lake include parking areas, two boat ramps, and a fish cleaning station.

Trails in the area offer opportunities for hiking. One trail follows the east side of the lake, while another heads south into Three Sisters Wilderness and on to Williamson Mountain.

== See also ==
- List of lakes in Oregon
