= Little Lava Lake =

Lake in Oregon, United States

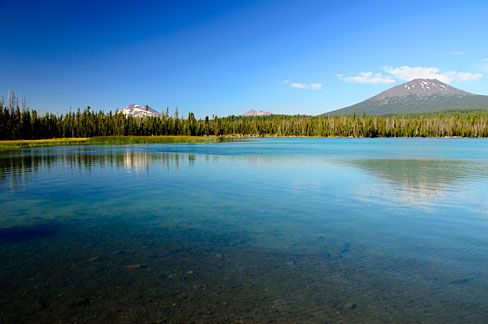

- Location within Oregon Location within the United States
- Location: Deschutes County, Oregon
- Coordinates: 43.910394°N 121.756698°W
- Type: Volcanogenic, mesotrophic
- Primary inflows: subsurface springs and occasional overflow from Lava Lake
- Primary outflows: Deschutes River
- Catchment area: 18 square miles (47 km^{2})
- Basin countries: United States
- Surface area: 138 acres (56 ha)
- Average depth: 8 feet (2.4 m)
- Max. depth: 20 feet (6.1 m)
- Water volume: 1,100 acre-feet (1,400,000 m^{3})
- Residence time: 2 months
- Shore length^{1}: 2.8 miles (4.5 km)
- Surface elevation: 4,744 feet (1,446 m)
- ^{1} Shore length is not a well-defined measure.

Little Lava Lake lies in the Cascade Range about 26 miles (42 km) west-southwest of Bend in the U.S. state of Oregon. A close neighbor of Lava Lake, from which it is separated by solidified lava, Little Lava Lake is at an elevation of 4,744 feet (1,446 m) in the Deschutes National Forest. Generally considered the source of the Deschutes River, the lake covers 138 acres (56 ha) to an average depth of 8 feet (2.4 m).

Lava Lake, Little Lava Lake, and other nearby lakes formed after lava flows from Mount Bachelor altered drainage patterns in the area. Solidified lava flows are visible along the shorelines of both lakes, and the volcanic peaks Broken Top and South Sister can be seen to the north.

== Recreation ==
Fish in the lake include stocked rainbow trout, wild brook trout, and tui chub. Caught trout average 10 to 12 inches (25 to 30 cm) and sometimes reach 17 inches (43 cm). In addition to fishing, the lake is used for canoeing, rafting, and swimming.

A United States Forest Service campground is near the lake, and Big Lava Lake, about 1/4 mile (0.40 km) away, also has campsites. The Little Lava Lake campground has 13 campsites, two tent-only sites for large groups, and a boat ramp.

Trails in the area offer opportunities for hiking and horseback riding. One trail follows the west side of Little Lava Lake and leads south into Three Sisters Wilderness and on to Williamson Mountain.

== Murders ==
In January 1924 the triple-murder of fur trappers, Edward Nickols, Roy Wilson, and Dewey Morris, occurred near the lake. Their bodies were discovered in Little Lava Lake in April 1924, where they had been deposited under the surface ice. The murders are unsolved.

== See also ==
- List of lakes in Oregon
- Lava Lake murders
