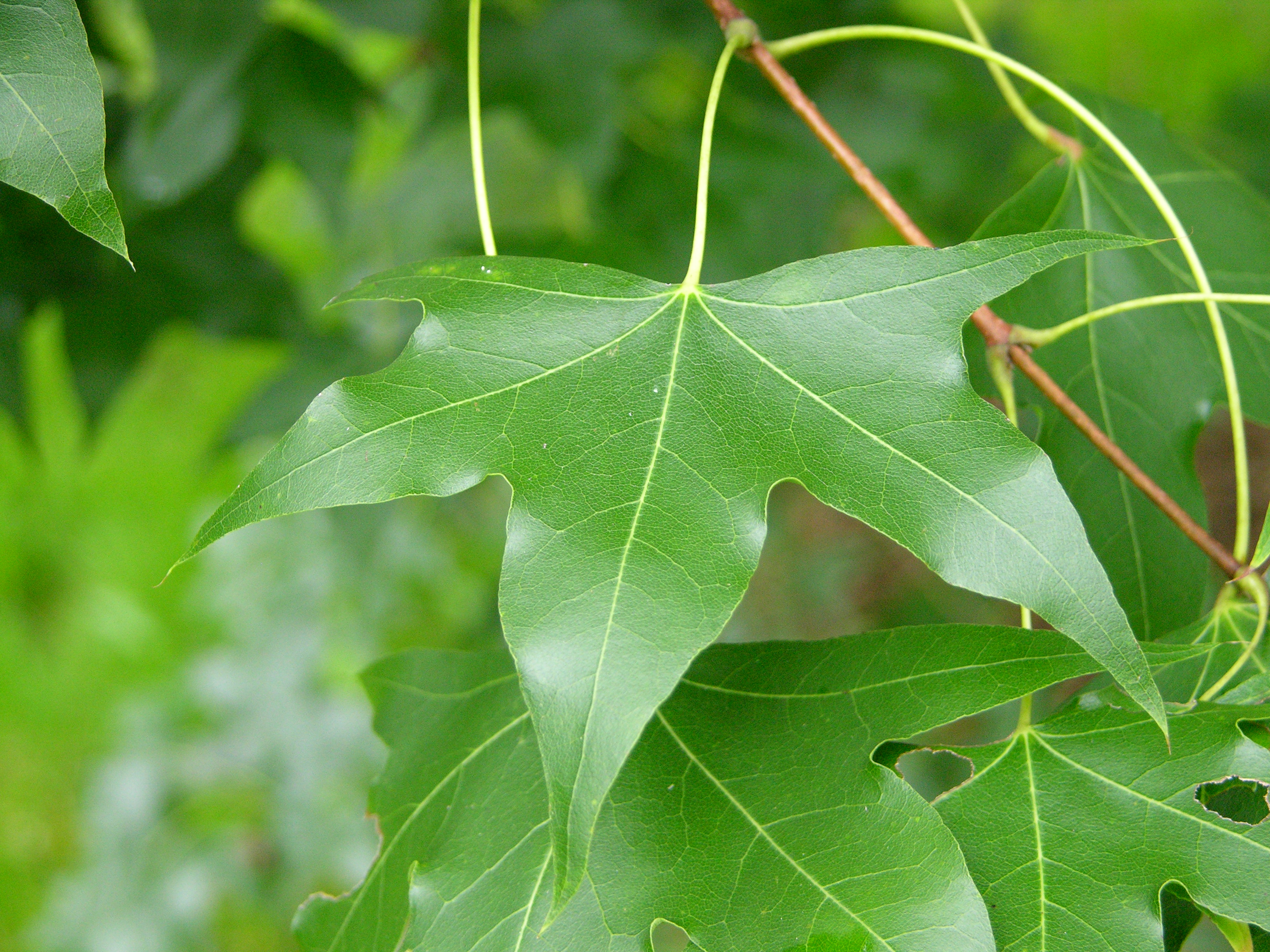
- Foliage

Conservation status
- Least Concern (IUCN 3.1)

Scientific classification
- Kingdom: Plantae
- Clade: Embryophytes
- Clade: Tracheophytes
- Clade: Spermatophytes
- Clade: Angiosperms
- Clade: Eudicots
- Clade: Rosids
- Order: Sapindales
- Family: Sapindaceae
- Genus: Acer
- Section: Acer sect. Platanoidea
- Species: A. truncatum

Binomial name
- Acer truncatum Bunge

= Acer truncatum =

Species of maple

Acer truncatum, the Shantung maple, Shandong maple, or purpleblow maple, is a maple native to northern China, in the provinces of Gansu, Hebei, Henan, Jiangsu, Jilin, Liaoning, Inner Mongolia, Shaanxi, Shandong, Shanxi, and to Korea.

It is a medium-sized deciduous tree growing to 15 metres (49 ft) tall with a broad, rounded crown. The bark is smooth on young trees, becoming shallowly ridged with age. The leaves are opposite, palmately lobed with five lobes, 5 centimetres (2.0 in) to 12 centimetres (4.7 in) long and 7 centimetres (2.8 in) to 11 centimetres (4.3 in) broad, with a 3 centimetres (1.2 in) to 10 centimetres (3.9 in) petiole; the lobes are usually entire, but occasionally with a pair of teeth on the largest central lobe, and the margin is often wavy. The petiole bleeds a milky latex when broken. The flowers are in corymbs, yellow-green with five petals 5 millimetres (0.20 in) to 7 millimetres (0.28 in) long; flowering occurs in early spring. The fruit is a double samara with two winged seeds, the seeds are disc-shaped, slightly flattened, 13 millimetres (0.51 in) to 18 millimetres (0.71 in) across. The wings are 2 centimetres (0.79 in) long, widely spread, approaching a 180° angle. The bark is greenish-grey, smooth in young trees, becoming shallowly grooved in mature. It is drought and heat resistant.

It is closely related to, and often difficult to distinguish from, Acer amplum, Acer cappadocicum, and Acer pictum subsp. mono, which replace it further south and west in China, and in Japan. From Acer cappadocicum it is best distinguished by the shoots which turn brown by their first winter, not remaining green for several years. From Acer mono (syn. A. pictum auct. non Thunb.) it is best distinguished by the larger, thicker (less flattened) seeds. Acer truncatum is very unusual among maples in showing hypogeal germination.

== Cultivation and uses ==
Shantung maple is grown as an ornamental plant in Europe and North America.

A number of cultivars have been selected, including 'Akikaze Nishiki' with variegated leaves, 'Fire Dragon' with very bright autumn colour. The cultivar 'Keithsform' (Norwegian Sunset) is a hybrid between Acer truncatum and Acer platanoides (Norway Maple).

== Gallery ==
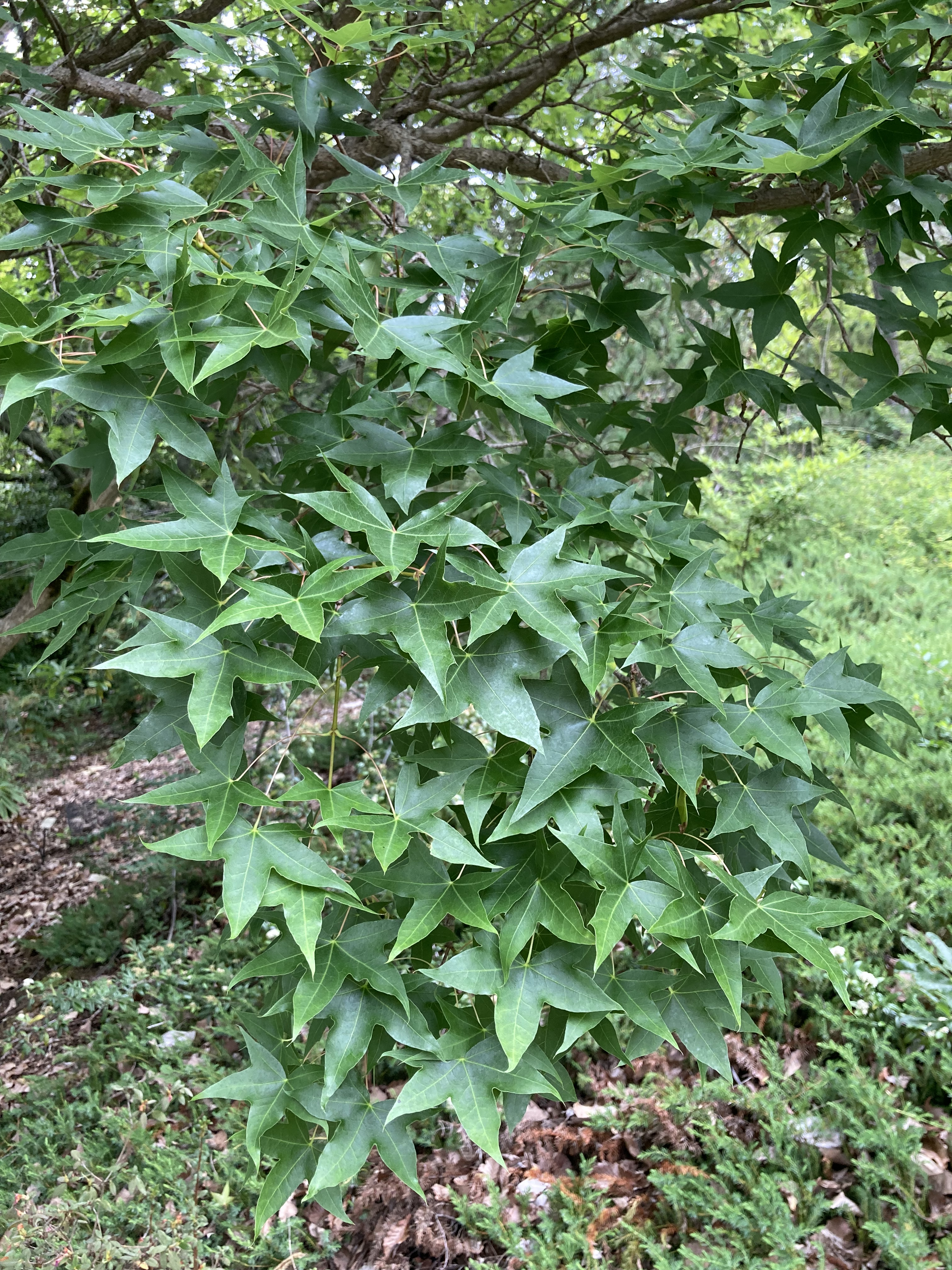
The leaves

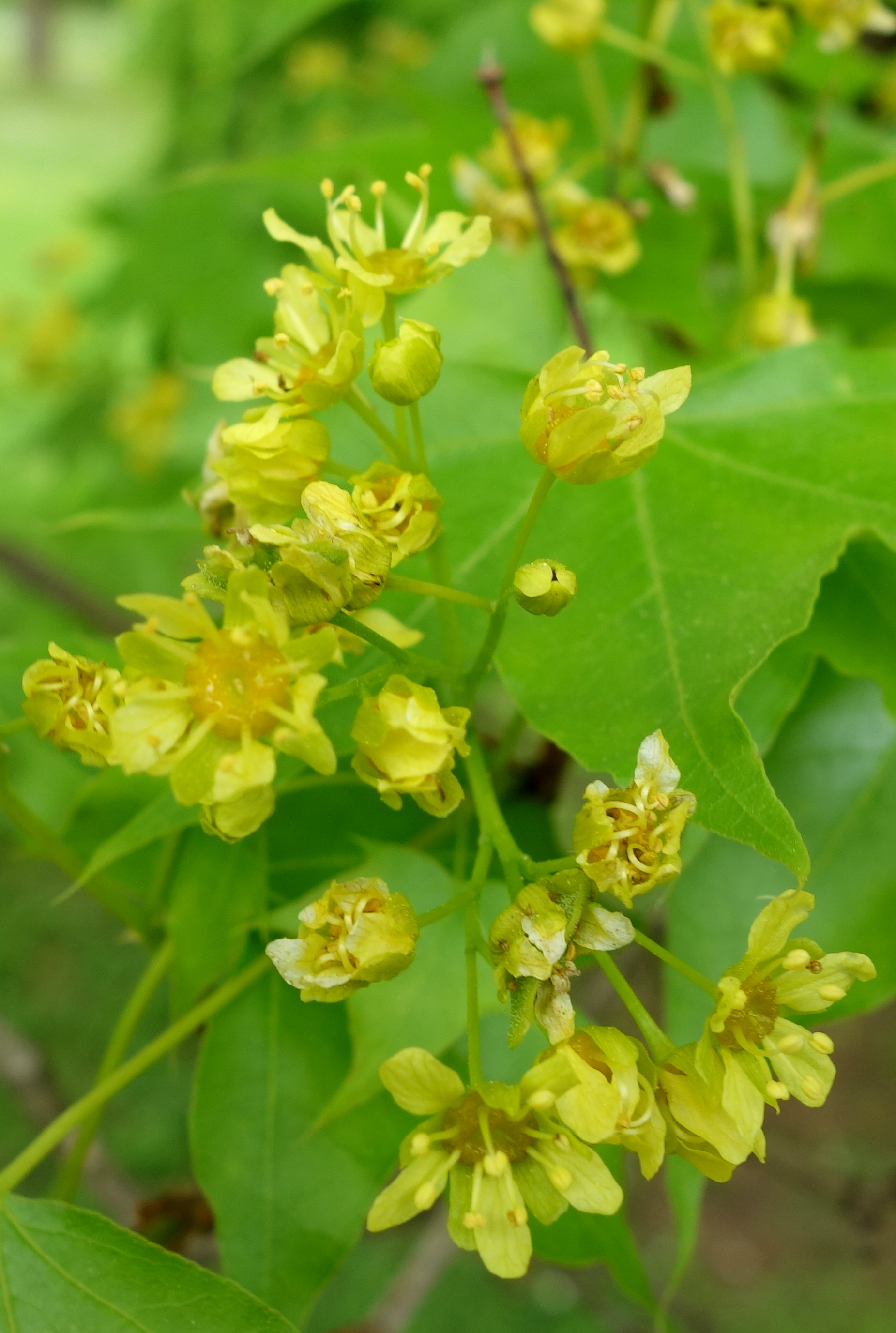
Detail of the flowers

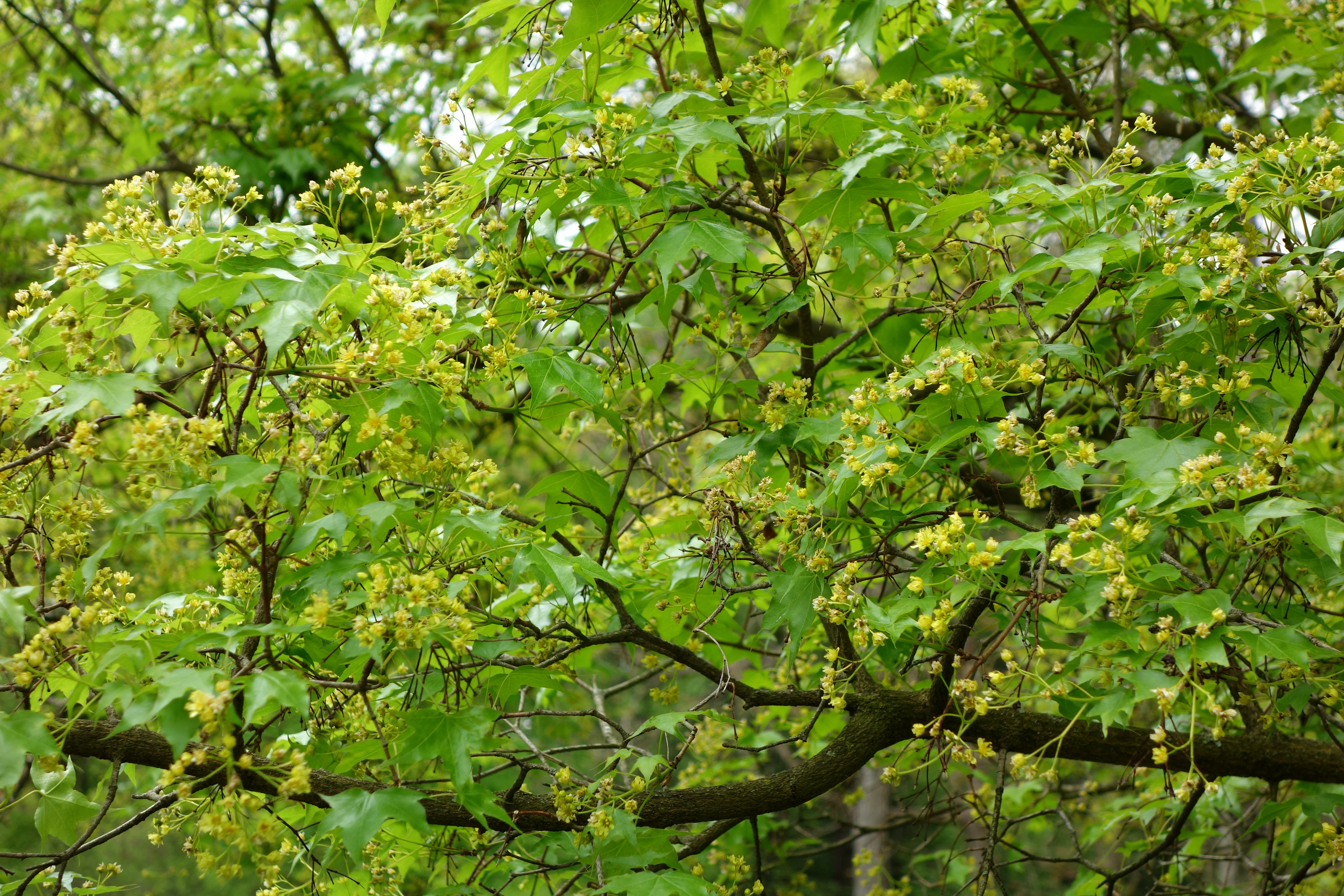
At the Morris Arboretum

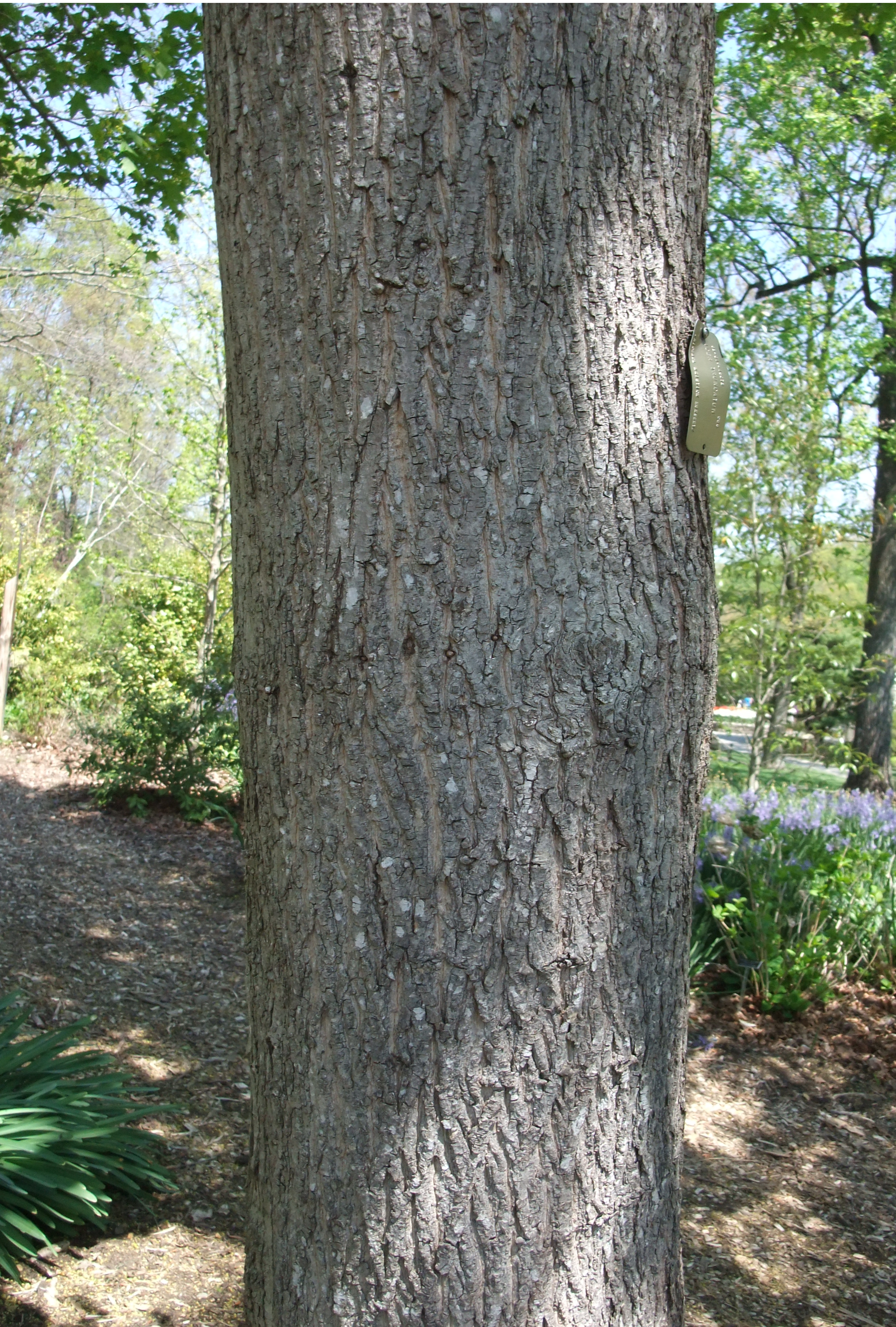
Detail of the bark
