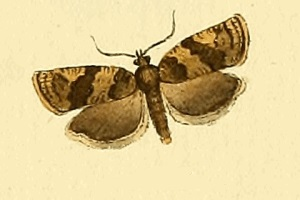

Scientific classification
- Kingdom: Animalia
- Phylum: Arthropoda
- Clade: Pancrustacea
- Class: Insecta
- Order: Lepidoptera
- Family: Tortricidae
- Genus: Choristoneura
- Species: C. diversana

Binomial name
- Choristoneura diversana (Hubner, [1814-1817])

Synonyms
- Tortrix diversana Hubner, [1814-1817]; Paedisca alfredana Duponchel, 1846; Tortrix transitana Guenee, 1845; Tortrix viduana Frolich, 1828

= Choristoneura diversana =

Species of moth

Choristoneura diversana is a species of moth of the family Tortricidae. It is found in Great Britain, France, Belgium, the Netherlands, Germany, Denmark, Austria, Switzerland, Italy, the Czech Republic, Slovakia, Slovenia, Poland, Bulgaria, Hungary, Romania, Norway, Sweden, Finland, the Baltic region, Russia and the Near East. In the east, the range extends to China (Heilongjiang), Korea and Japan. The habitat consists of gardens, scrub and fens.

The wingspan is 15–20 mm for males and 19–23 mm for females. Adults have been recorded on wing from June to August in western Europe.

The larvae feed on Acer pictum, Achillea (including Achillea millefolium), Alnus (including Alnus hirsuta), Betula, Lonicera (including Lonicera periclymenum), Trifolium, Quercus (including Quercus acutissima, Quercus robur), Syringa, Populus (including Populus nigra), Salix, Ulmus (including Ulmus davidiana, Ulmus laciniata), Prunus and Pyrus species, as well as Morus bombycis, Abies concolor, Abies holophylla, Abies sachalinensis, Larix kaempferi, Picea jezoensis, Rhamnus cathartica, Malus pumila and Malus sylvestris. They live within spun or rolled leaves of their host plant.
