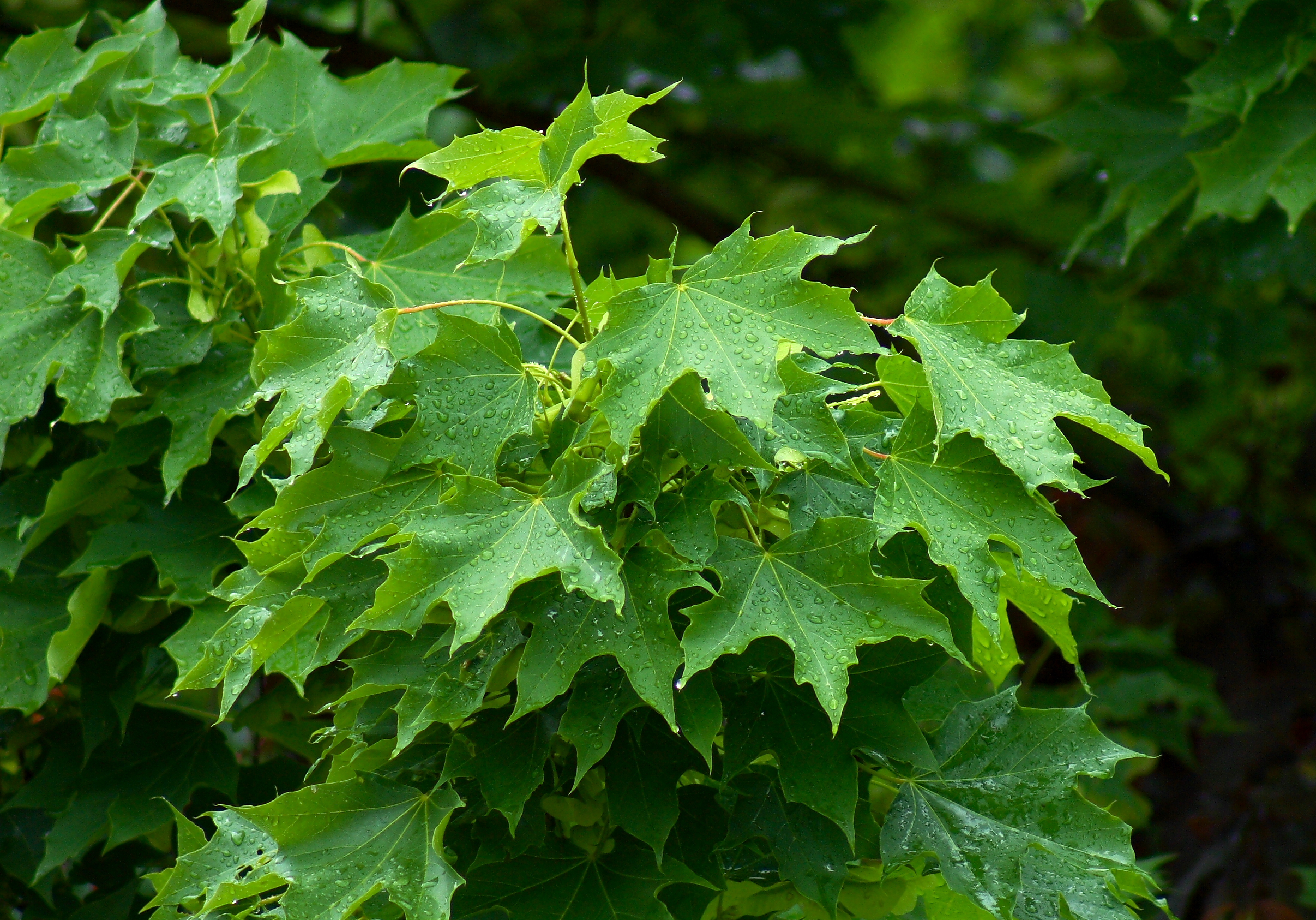

Conservation status
- Least Concern (IUCN 3.1)

Scientific classification
- Kingdom: Plantae
- Clade: Tracheophytes
- Clade: Angiosperms
- Clade: Eudicots
- Clade: Rosids
- Order: Sapindales
- Family: Sapindaceae
- Genus: Acer
- Section: Acer sect. Platanoidea
- Species: A. platanoides

Binomial name
- Acer platanoides L.
- Distribution map (native habitat)

Synonyms
- List: Acer cappadocicum subsp. turkestanicum (Pax) A.E.Murray; Acer dieckii (Pax) Pax; Acer dieckii f. integrilobum Schwer.; Acer dieckii f. monstrosum Schwer.; Acer fallax Pax; Acer laciniatum Borkh. ex Tratt.; Acer lactescens Pers.; Acer laetum var. cordifolium R.Uechtr. & Sint.; Acer lobelii var. dieckii Pax; Acer lobergii Dippel; Acer palmatifidum Tausch ex Steud.; Acer platanifolium Stokes; Acer reitenbachii Dippel; Acer rotundum Dulac; Acer schwedleri K.Koch; Acer vitifolium Opiz ex Tausch.; Euacer acutifolium Opiz; Euacer platanoides (L.) Opiz; Acer lipskyi Rehder ex Lipsky; Acer pseudolaetum Radde-Fom.; Acer turkestanicum Pax

= Acer platanoides =

Norway maple

Species of flowering plant in the soapberry family

Acer platanoides, commonly known as the Norway maple, is a species of maple native to eastern and central Europe and western Asia, from Spain east to Russia, north to southern Scandinavia and southeast to northern Iran. It was introduced to North America in the mid-1700s as a shade tree. It is a member of the family Sapindaceae.

== Description ==
Acer platanoides is a deciduous tree, growing to 20–30 m (65–100 ft) tall with a trunk up to 1.5 m (5 ft) in diameter, and a broad, rounded crown. The bark is grey-brown and shallowly grooved. Unlike many other maples, mature trees do not tend to develop a shaggy bark. The shoots are green at first, soon becoming pale brown. The winter buds are shiny red-brown.

The leaves are opposite, palmately lobed with five lobes, 7–14 cm (2 3/4–5 1/2 in) long and 8–25 cm (3 1/4–9 3/4 in) across; the lobes each bear one to three side teeth, and an otherwise smooth margin. The leaf petiole is 8–20 cm (3 1/4–7 3/4 in) long, and secretes a milky juice when broken. The autumn colour is usually yellow, occasionally orange-red.

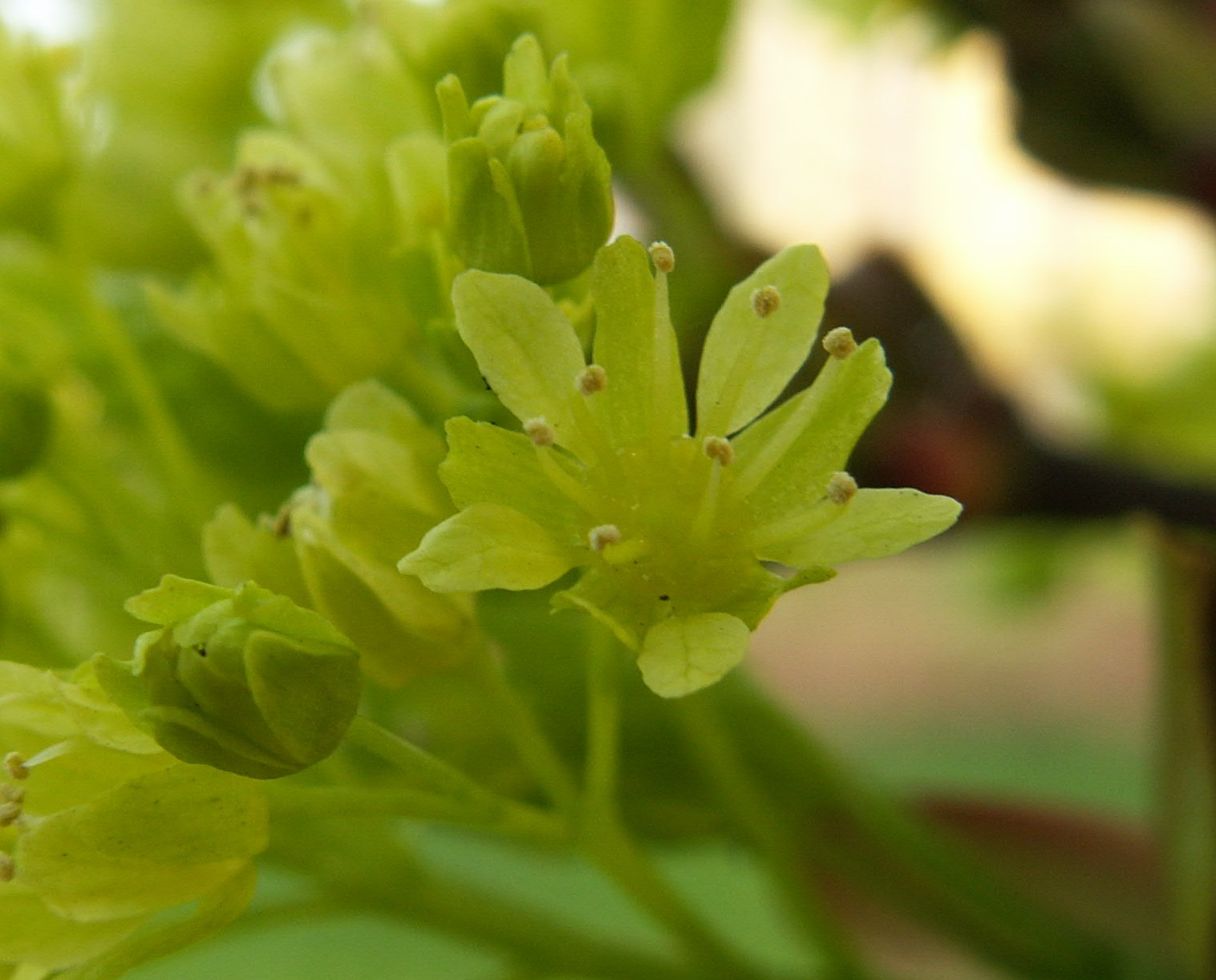
Flower, close-up

The flowers are in corymbs of 15–30 together, yellow to yellow-green with five sepals and five petals 3–4 mm (1/8–3/16 in) long; flowering occurs in early spring before the new leaves emerge. The fruit is a double samara with two winged seeds. the seeds are disc-shaped, strongly flattened, 10–15 mm (3/8–5/8 in) across and 3 mm (1/8 in) thick. The wings are 3–5 cm (1 1/4–2 in) long, widely spread, approaching a 180° angle. It typically produces a large quantity of viable seeds.

Under ideal conditions in its native range, Norway maple may live up to 250 years, but often has a much shorter life expectancy; in North America, for example, sometimes only 60 years. Especially when used on streets, it can have insufficient space for its root network and is prone to the roots wrapping around themselves, girdling and killing the tree. In addition, their roots tend to be quite shallow and thereby they easily out-compete nearby plants for nutrient uptake. Norway maples often cause significant damage and cleanup costs for municipalities and homeowners when branches break off in storms as they do not have strong wood.

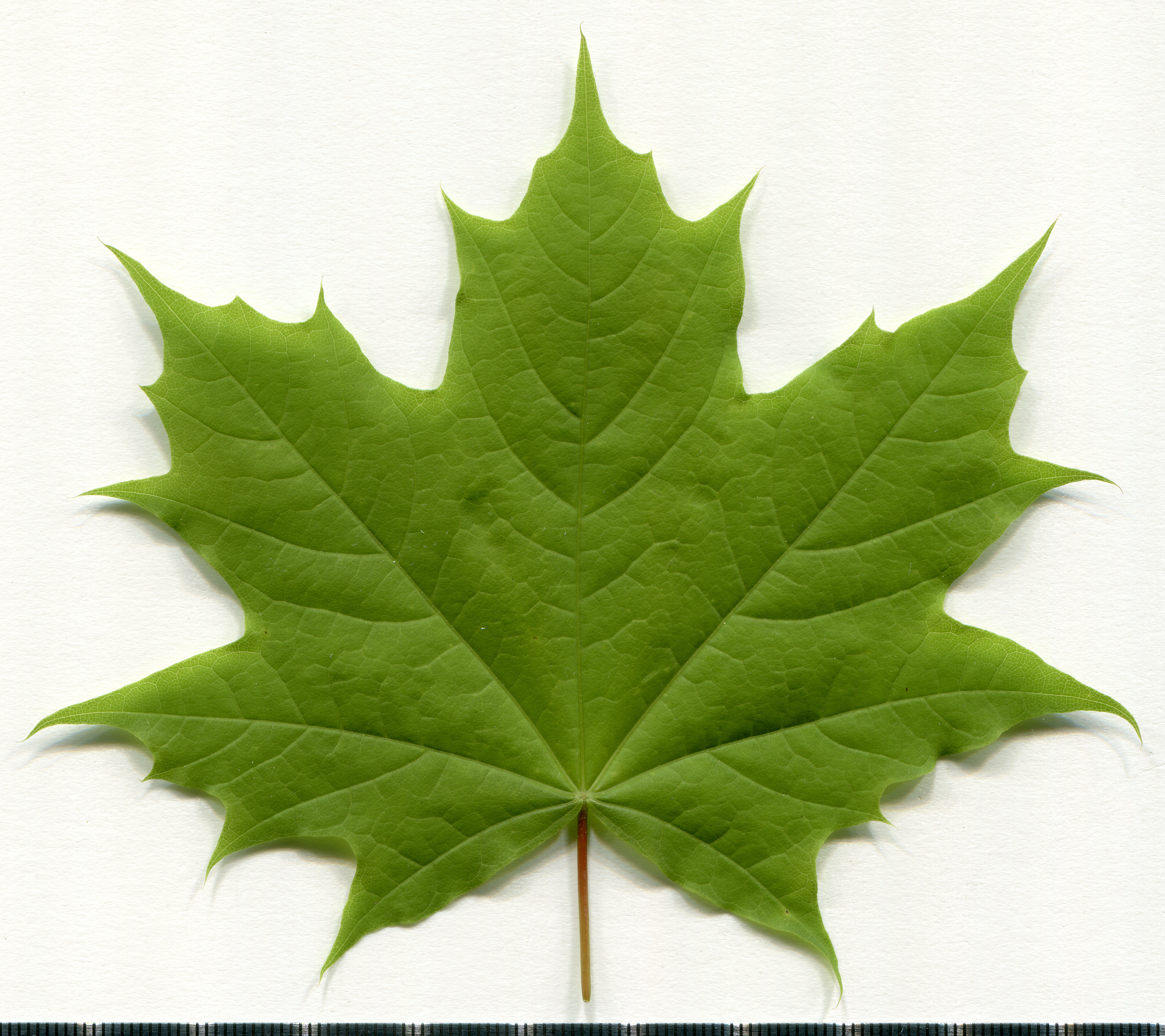
Leaf, adaxial side

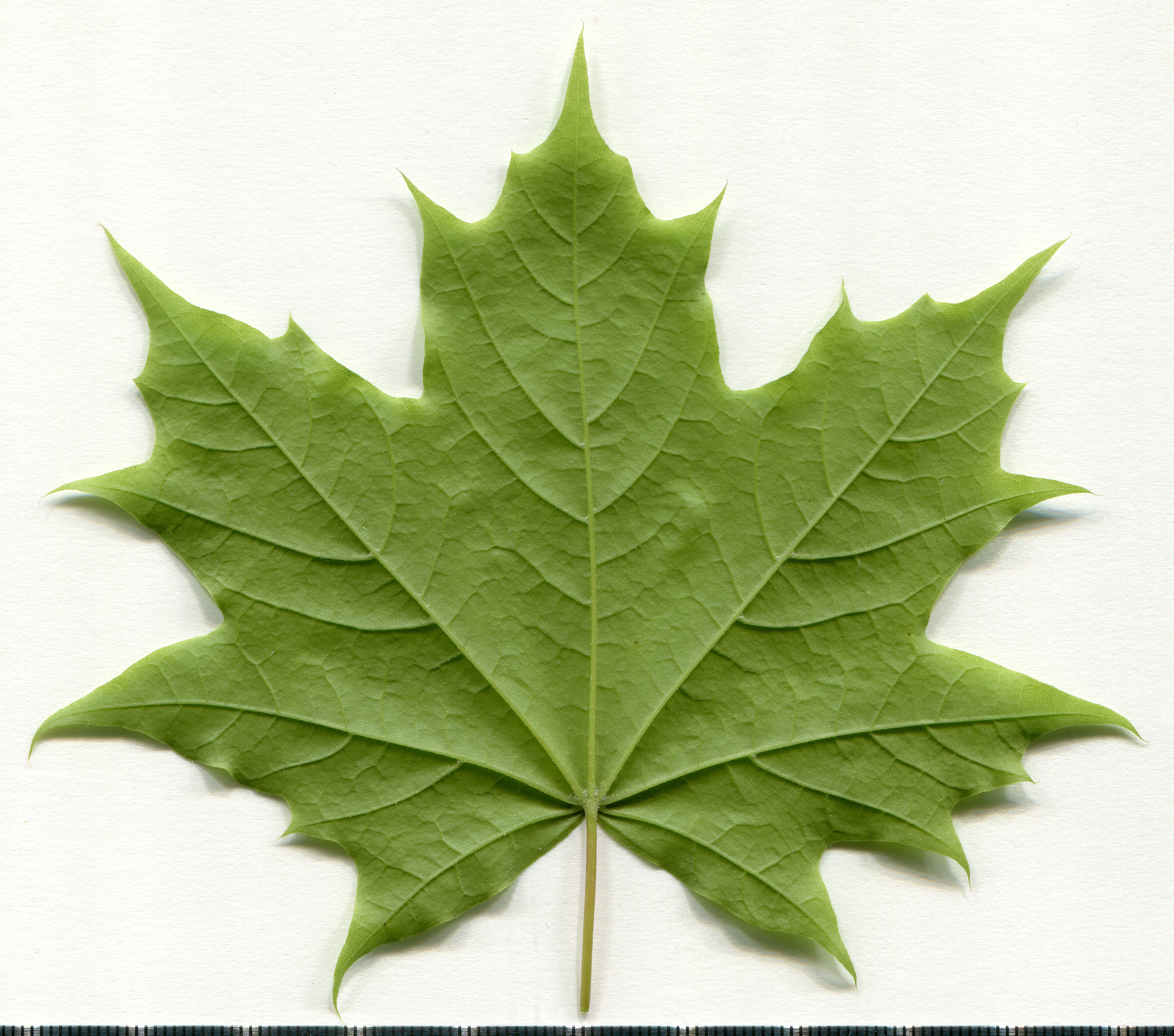
Leaf, abaxial side

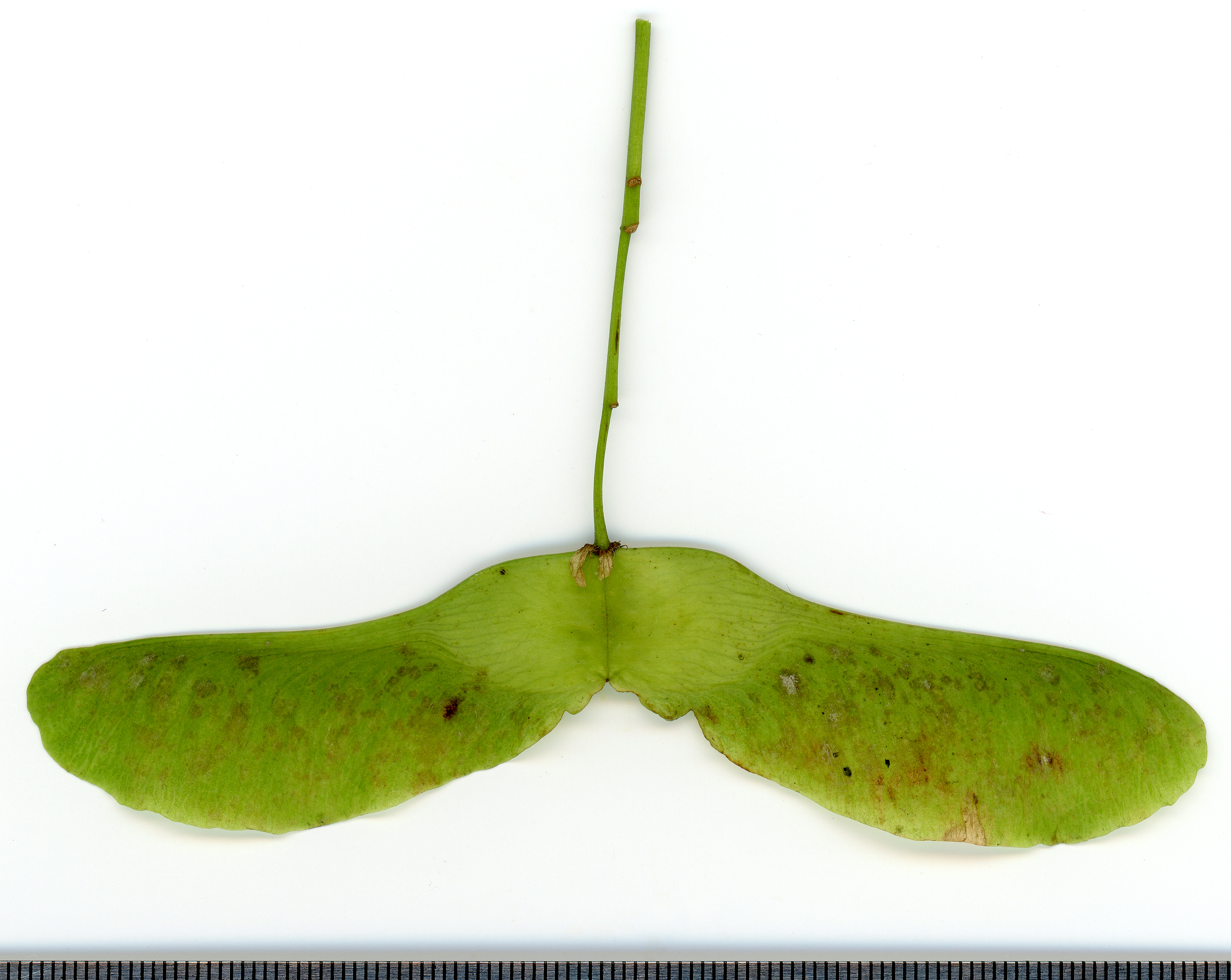
Fruit

== Classification and identification ==
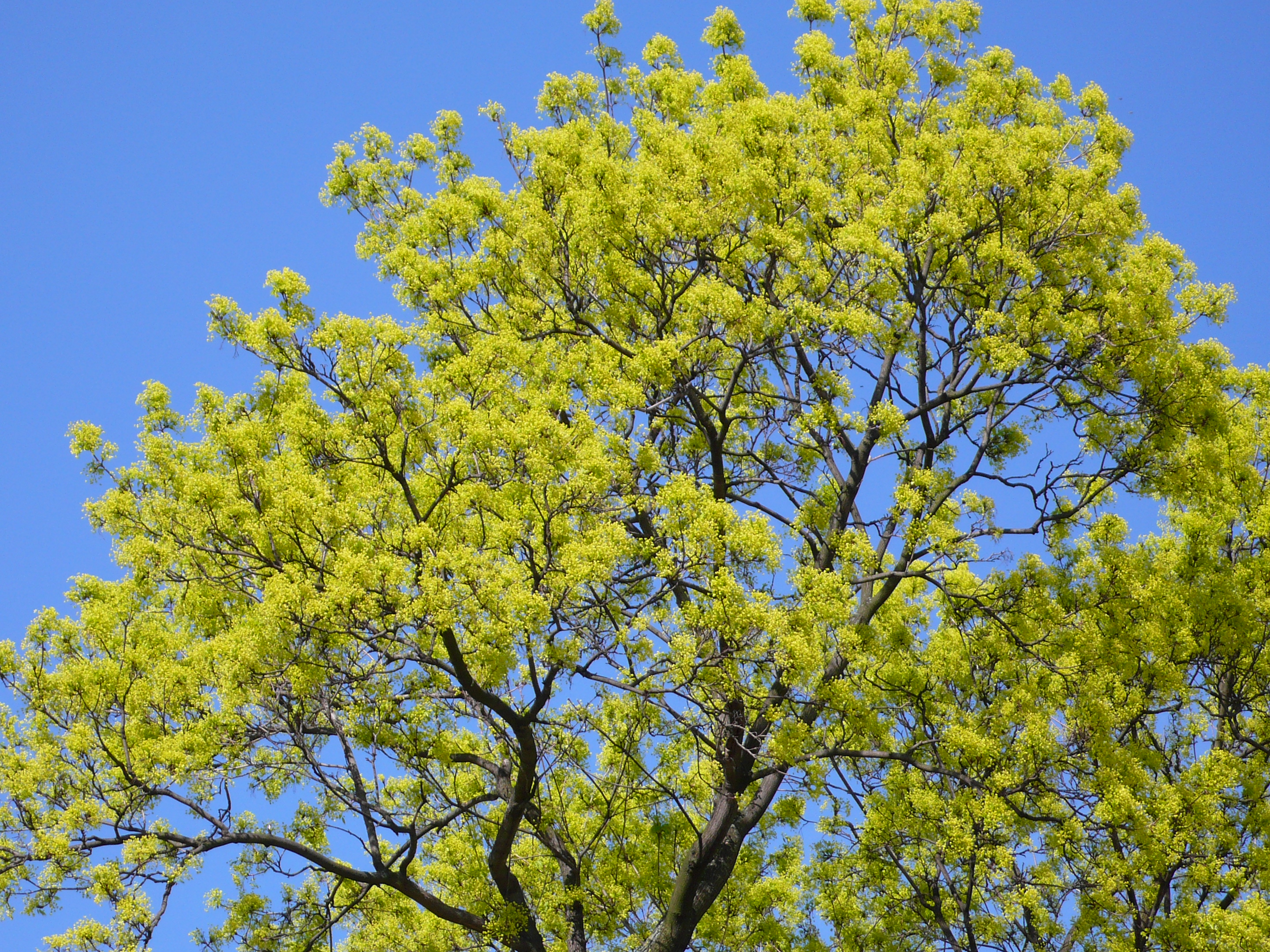
Tree in flower

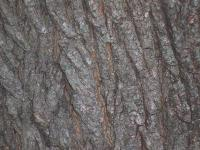
Bark

The Norway maple is a member (and is the type species) of the section Platanoidea Pax, characterised by flattened, disc-shaped seeds and the shoots and leaves containing milky sap. Other related species in this section include Acer campestre (field maple), Acer cappadocicum (Cappadocian maple), Acer lobelii (Lobel's maple), and Acer truncatum (Shandong maple). From the field maple, the Norway maple is distinguished by its larger leaves with pointed, not blunt, lobes, and from the other species by the presence of one or more teeth on all of the lobes.

It is also frequently confused with the more distantly related Acer saccharum (sugar maple). The sugar maple is easy to differentiate by clear sap in the petiole (leaf stem); Norway maple petioles have white, milky sap. The tips of the points on Norway maple leaves reduce to a fine "hair", while the tips of the points on sugar maple leaves are, on close inspection, rounded. On mature trees, sugar maple bark is more shaggy, while Norway maple bark has small, often criss-crossing grooves. While the shape and angle of leaf lobes vary somewhat within all maple species, the leaf lobes of Norway maple tend to have a more triangular (acuminate) shape, in contrast to the more finely toothed lobes of sugar maples, that narrow towards the base. Flowering and seed production begins at ten years of age; however, large quantities of seeds are not produced until the tree is 20. The Norway maple is heterodichogamous—meaning there are both protogynous and protandrous trees (and, more rarely, duodichogamous trees)—and individual trees may change sexual expression from year to year.

The fruits of Norway maple are paired samaras with widely diverging wings, distinguishing them from those of sycamore, Acer pseudoplatanus, which are at 90 degrees to each other. Norway maple seeds are flattened, while those of sugar maple are globose. The sugar maple usually has a brighter orange autumn color, where the Norway maple is usually yellow, although some of the red-leaved cultivars appear more orange.

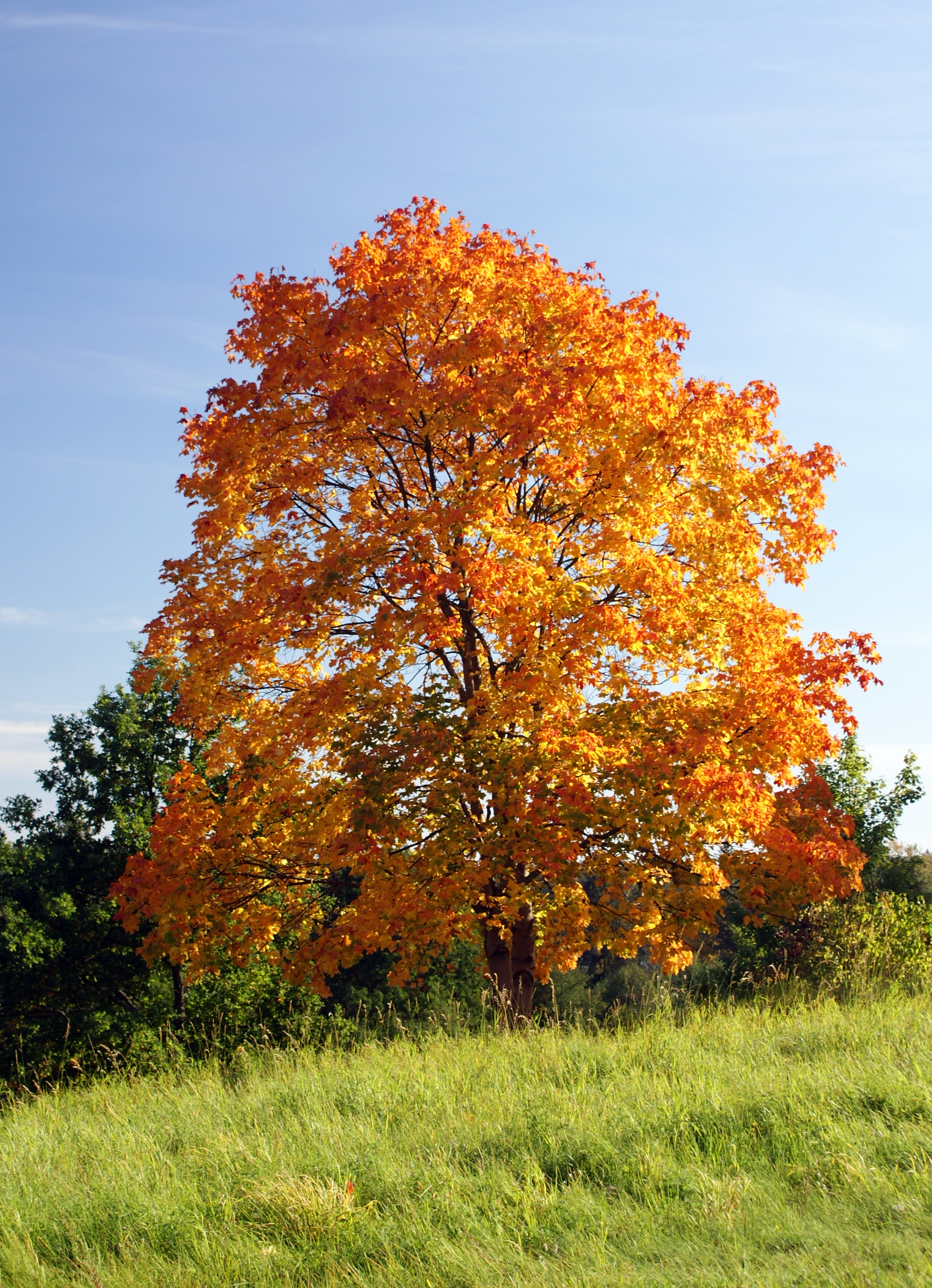
Norway maple in autumn

The flowers emerge in spring before the leaves and last 2–3 weeks. Leafout of Norway maple occurs roughly when air temperatures reach 55°F (12°C) and there is at least 13 hours of daylight. Leaf drop in autumn is initiated when day lengths fall to approximately 10 hours. Depending on the latitude, leaf drop may vary by as much as three weeks, beginning in the second week of October in Scandinavia and the first week of November in southern Europe. Unlike some other maples that wait for the soil to warm up, A. platanoides seeds require only three months of exposure to temperatures lower than 4 °C (40 °F) and will sprout in early spring, around the same time that leafout begins. Norway maple does not require freezing temperatures for proper growth; however, it is adapted to higher latitudes with long summer days and does not perform well when planted south of the 37th parallel, the approximate southern limit of its range in Europe. Further, most North American Norway maples are believed descended from stock brought from Germany, at approximately 48°N to 54°N, not the more southerly ecotypes found in Italy and the Balkans that evolved for similar lighting conditions as the continental United States. The heavy seed crop and high germination rate contributes to its invasiveness in North America, where it forms dense monotypic stands that choke out native vegetation. The tree is also capable of growing in low lighting conditions within a forest canopy, leafs out earlier than most North American maple species, and its growing season tends to run longer as the lighting conditions of the United States (see above) result in fall dormancy occurring later than it does in the higher latitude of Europe. It is one of the few introduced species that can successfully invade and colonize a virgin forest. By comparison, in its native range, Norway maple is rarely a dominant species and instead occurs mostly as a scattered understory tree.

== Cultivation and uses ==
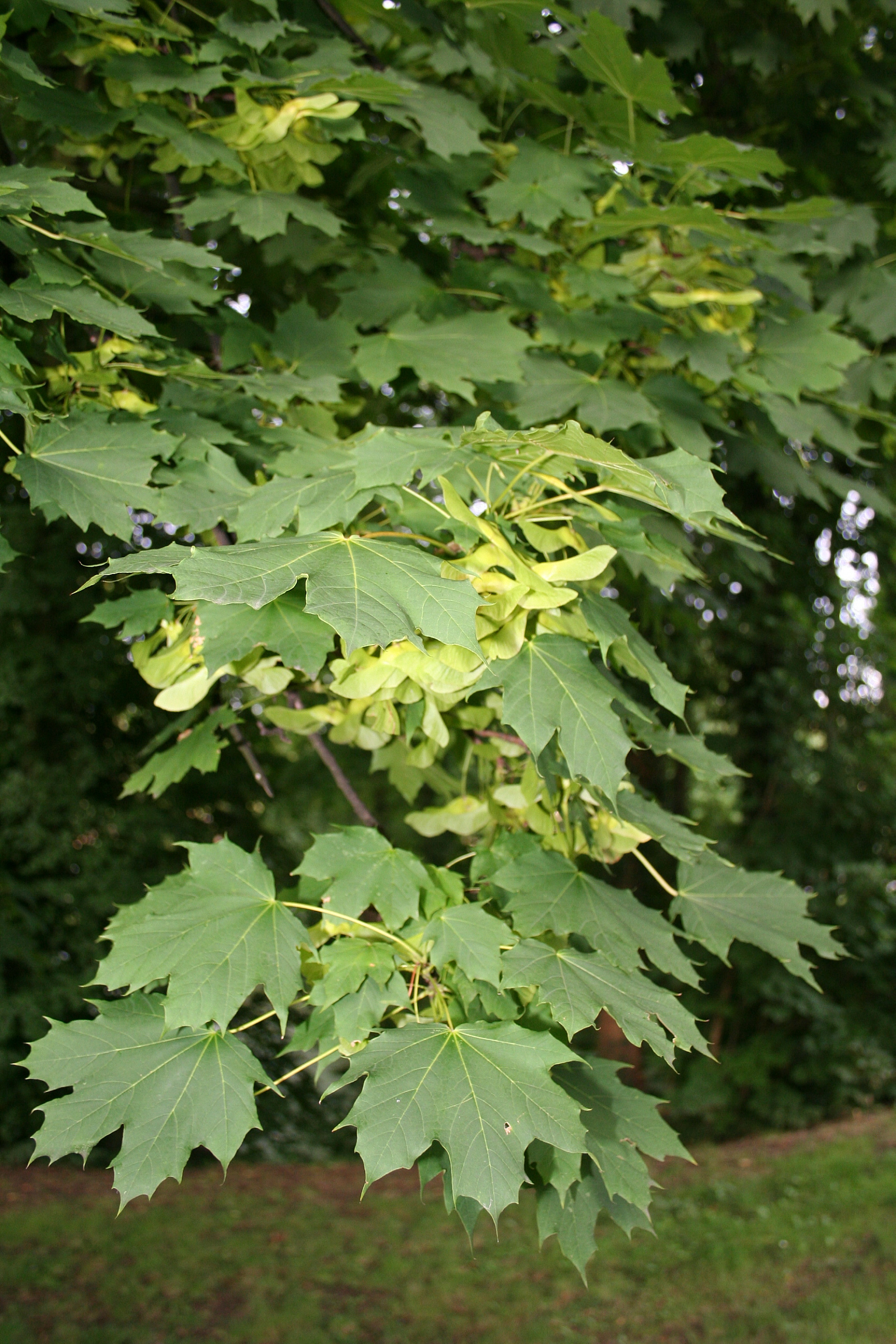
Foliage and fruits; the fruit are an important characteristic for identification of this species.

The wood is hard, yellowish-white to pale reddish, with the heartwood not distinct; it is used for furniture and woodturning. Norway maple sits ambiguously between hard and soft maple with a Janka hardness of 1,010 lbf or 4,500 N. The wood is rated as non-durable to perishable in regard to decay resistance. In Europe, it is used for furniture, flooring and musical instruments, especially for violins.

Norway maple has been widely taken into cultivation in other areas, including western Europe northwest of its native range. It grows north of the Arctic Circle at Tromsø, Norway. In North America, it is planted as a street and shade tree as far north as Anchorage, Alaska. In Ontario, it is common in cultivation north to Sault Ste. Marie and Sudbury; although not considered reliably hardy northward, it has been established at Kapuskasing and Iroquois Falls, and even at Moose Factory. It is most recommended in USDA Hardiness Zones 4 to 7 but will grow in warmer zones (at least up to Zone 10) where summer heat is moderate, as along the Pacific coast south to the Los Angeles Basin. They tend to prefer wetter Oceanic climates. During the 1950s–60s it became popular as a street tree due to the large-scale loss of American elms from Dutch elm disease.

It is favored due to its tall trunk and tolerance of poor, compacted soils and urban pollution, conditions in which the sugar maple has difficulty. It has become a popular species for bonsai in Europe, and is used for medium to large bonsai sizes and a multitude of styles. Norway maples are not typically cultivated for maple syrup production due to the lower sugar content of the sap compared to sugar maple.

== Cultivars ==
Many cultivars have been selected for distinctive leaf shapes or colorations, such as the dark purple of 'Crimson King' and 'Schwedleri', the variegated leaves of 'Drummondii', the light green of 'Emerald Queen', and the deeply divided, feathery leaves of 'Dissectum' and 'Lorbergii'. The purple-foliage cultivars have orange to red autumn colour. 'Columnare' is selected for its narrow upright growth. The cultivars 'Crimson King' and 'Prigold' (Princeton Gold) have gained the Royal Horticultural Society's Award of Garden Merit.

=== As an invasive species in North America ===
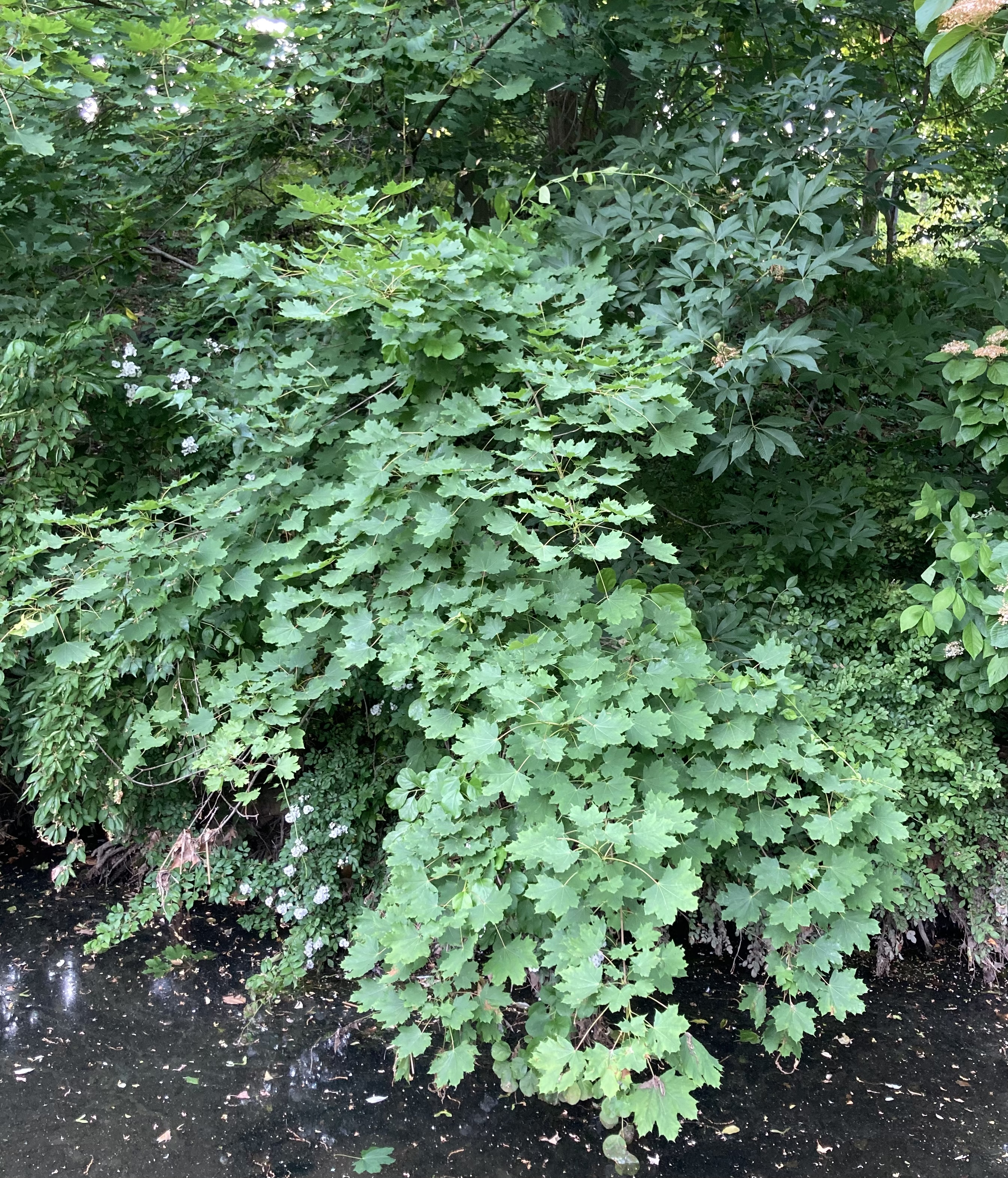
Feral Norway maple in Philadelphia.

The Norway maple was introduced to northeastern North America between 1750 and 1760 as an ornamental shade tree. It was brought to the Pacific Northwest in the 1870s. Today, Norway maples tend to be most common in the Pacific Northwest, in southern Ontario, and along the Kennebec river in southern Maine. The roots of Norway maples grow very close to the ground surface, starving other plants of moisture. For example, lawn grass (and even weeds) will usually not grow well beneath a Norway maple, but English ivy, with its minimal rooting needs, may thrive. In addition, the dense canopy of Norway maples can inhibit understory growth. Some have suggested Norway maples may also release chemicals to discourage undergrowth, although this claim is controversial. A. platanoides has been shown to inhibit the growth of native saplings as a canopy tree or as a sapling. The Norway maple also suffers less herbivory than the sugar maple, allowing it to gain a competitive advantage against the latter species. As a result of these characteristics, it is considered invasive in some states, and has been banned for sale in New Hampshire, New Jersey, and Massachusetts. The state of New York has classified it as an invasive plant species. Despite these steps, the species is still available and widely used for urban plantings in many areas.

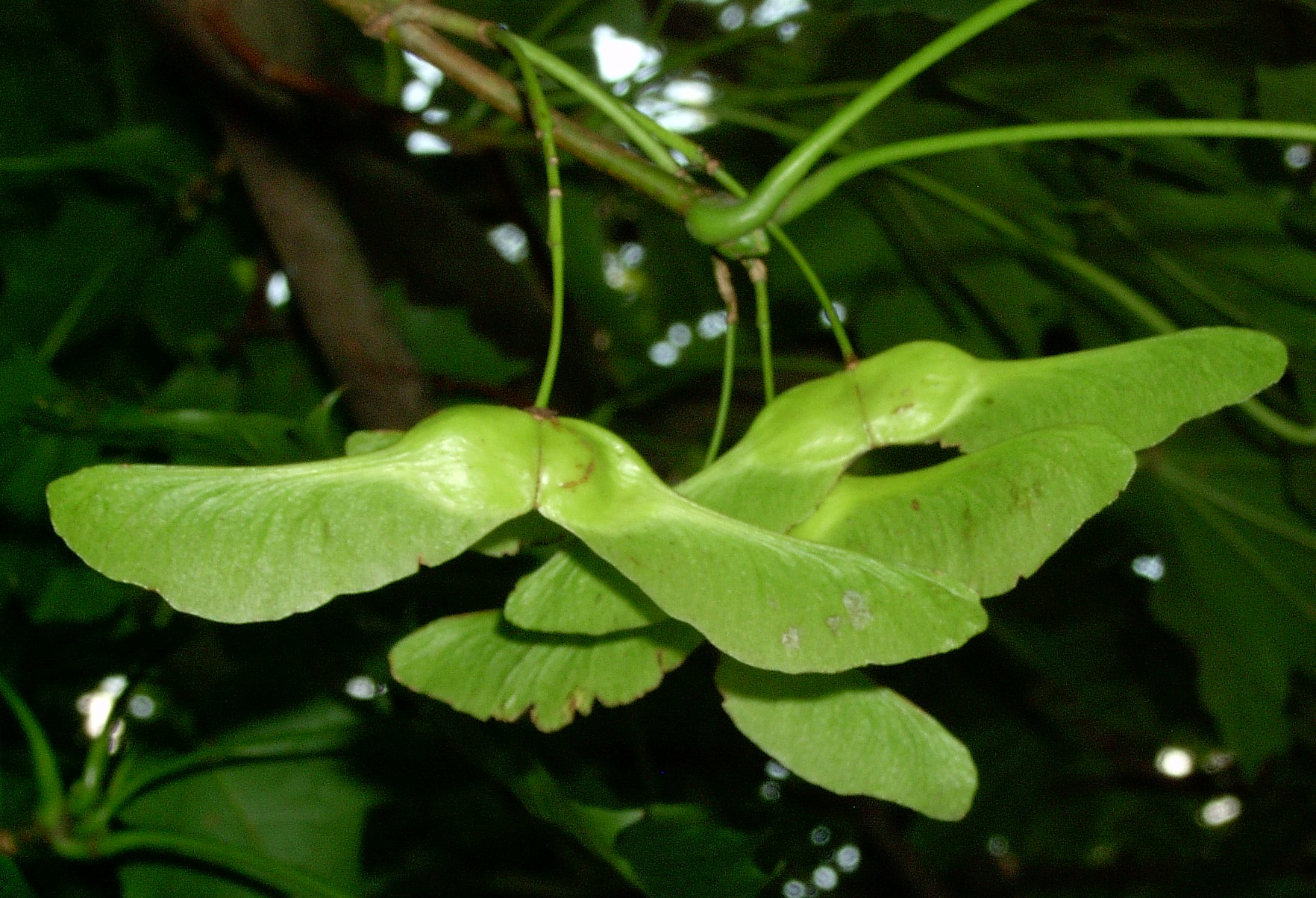
Fruit (samara): note the flat seed capsule and the angle of the "wings"

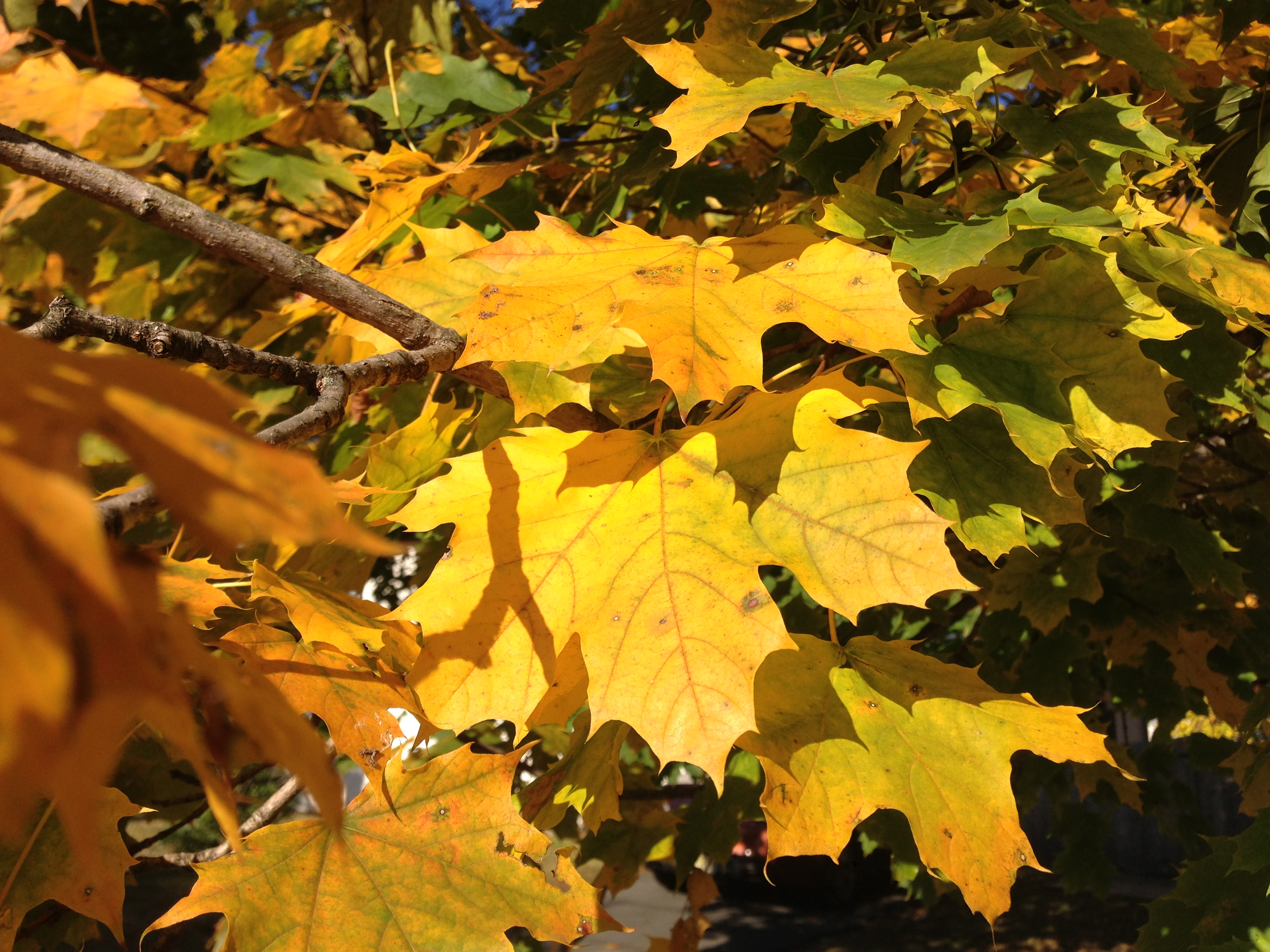
Typical yellow fall foliage

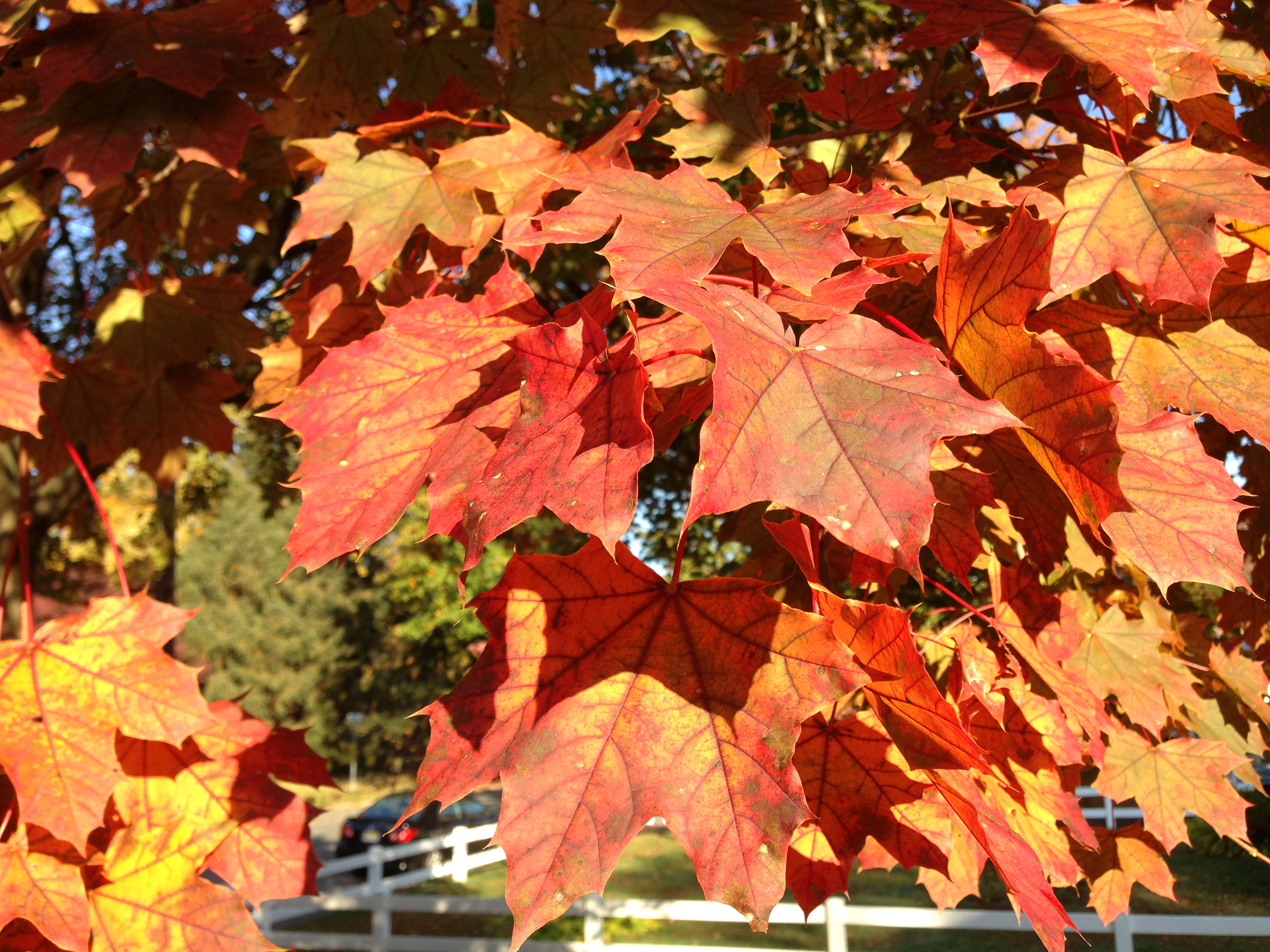
Atypical orange-red fall colour

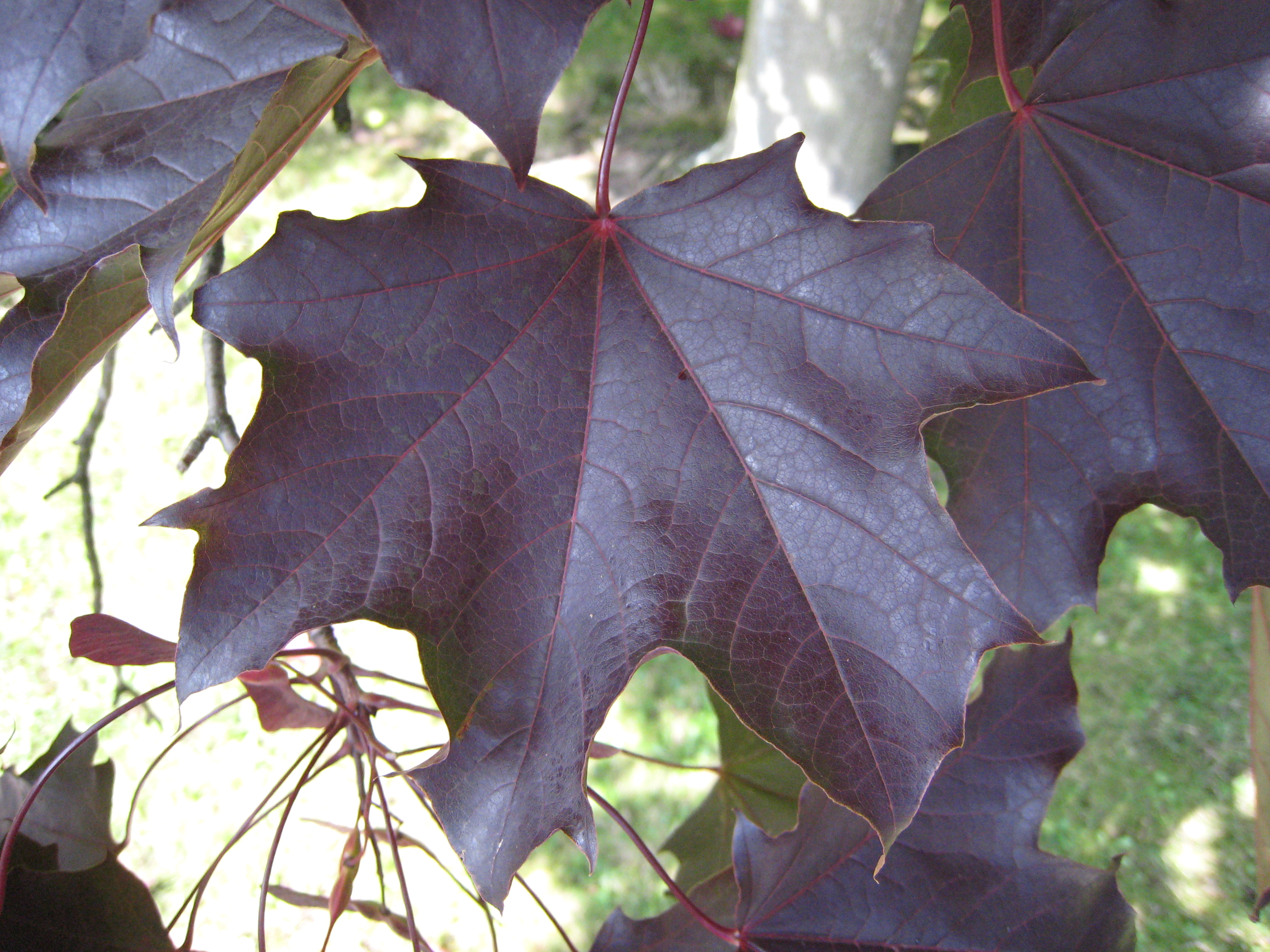
Purple leaves of cultivar 'Schwedleri'

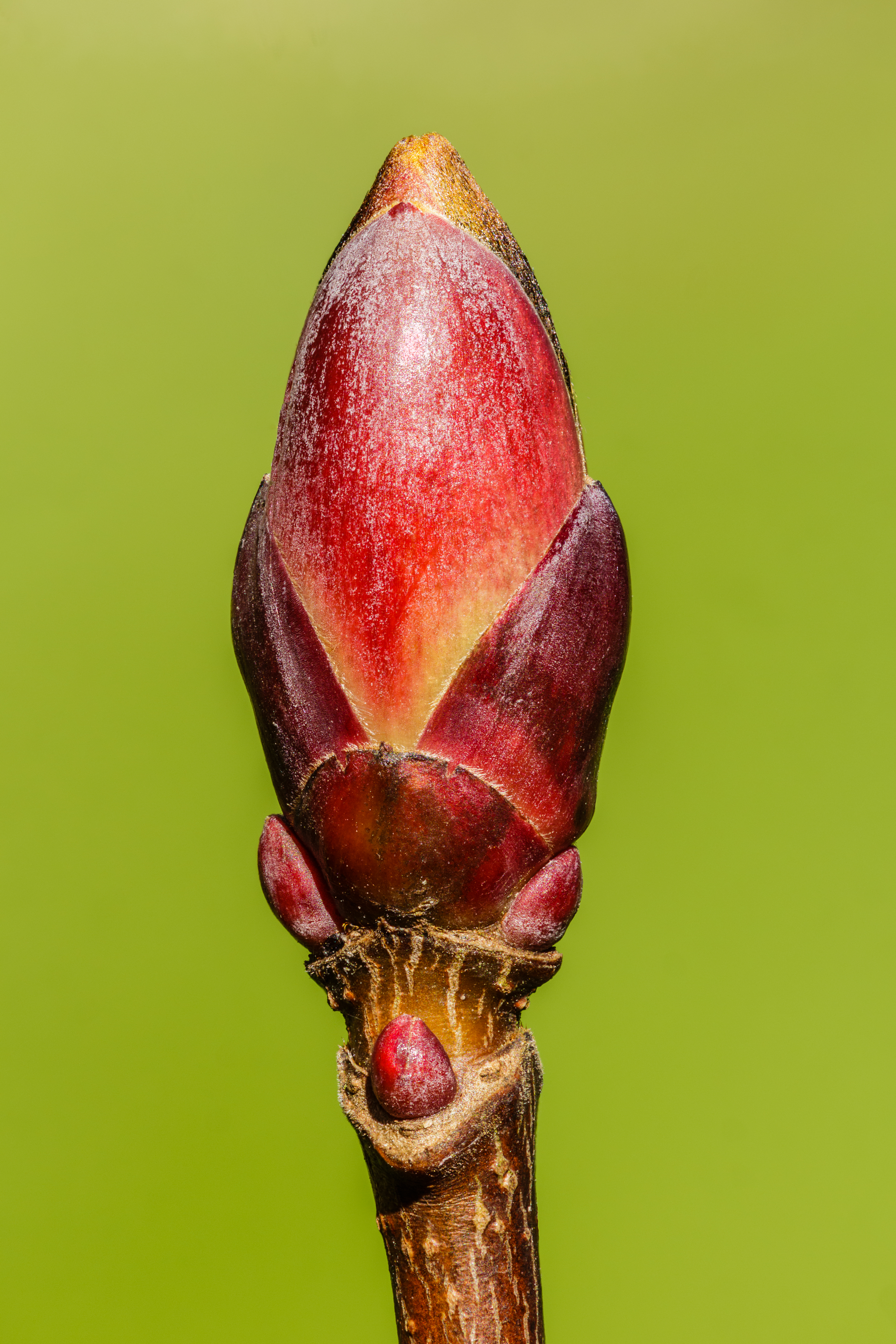
Leaf bud.

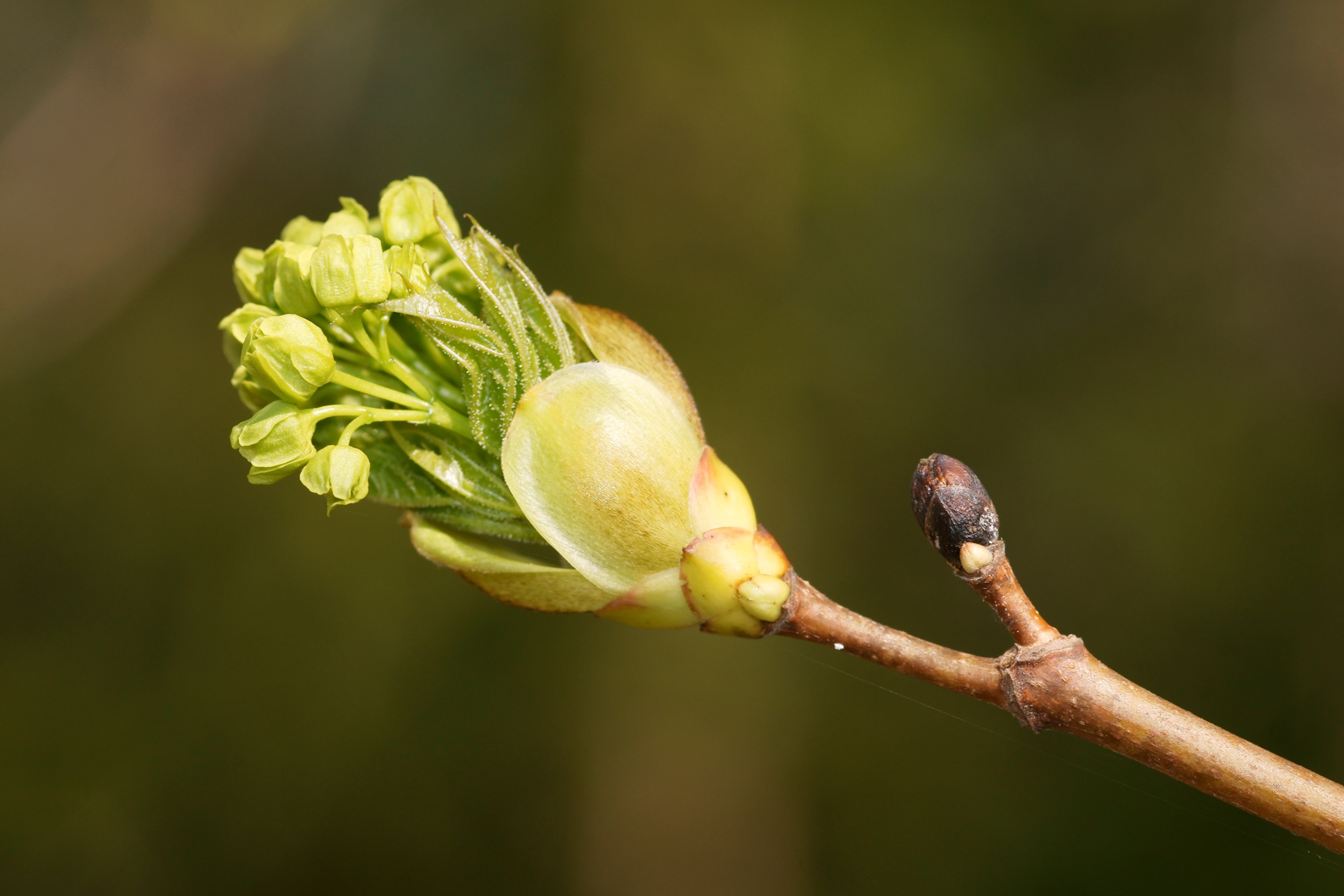
Flower buds contain also leaves

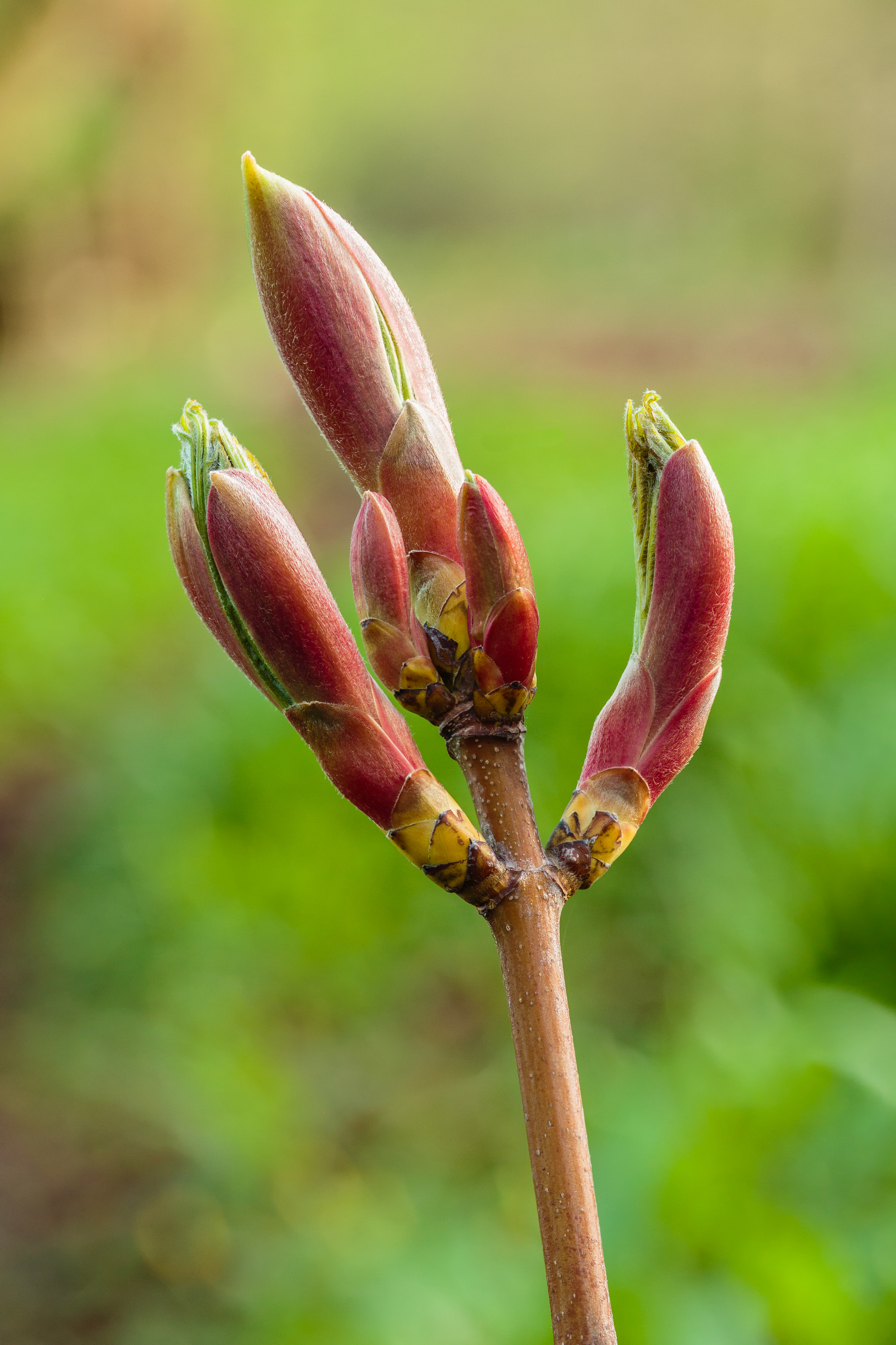
Red-tipped buds of a Acer platanoides.

== Natural enemies ==
The larvae of a number of species of Lepidoptera feed on Norway maple foliage. Ectoedemia sericopeza, the Norway maple seedminer, is a moth of the family Nepticulidae. The larvae emerge from eggs laid on the samara and tunnel to the seeds. Norway maple is generally free of serious diseases, though can be attacked by the powdery mildew Uncinula bicornis, and verticillium wilt disease caused by Verticillium spp. "Tar spots" caused by Rhytisma acerinum infection are common but largely harmless. Aceria pseudoplatani is an acarine mite that causes a 'felt gall', found on the underside of leaves of both sycamore maple (Acer pseudoplatanus) and Norway maples.
