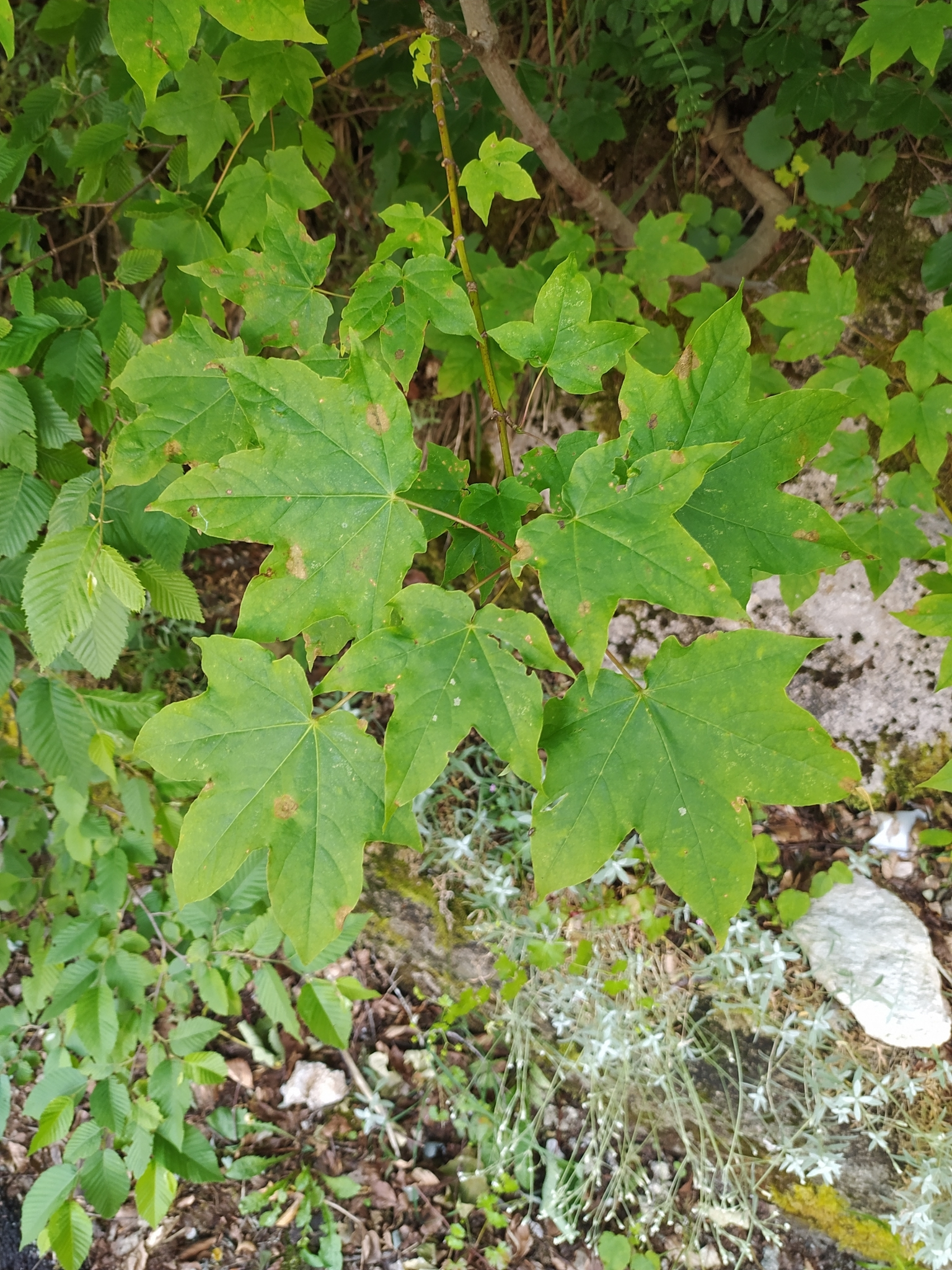
- Foliage, in Campania, southern Italy

Conservation status
- Least Concern (IUCN 3.1)

Scientific classification
- Kingdom: Plantae
- Clade: Embryophytes
- Clade: Tracheophytes
- Clade: Spermatophytes
- Clade: Angiosperms
- Clade: Eudicots
- Clade: Rosids
- Order: Sapindales
- Family: Sapindaceae
- Genus: Acer
- Section: Acer sect. Platanoidea
- Species: A. lobelii

Binomial name
- Acer lobelii Ten.

Synonyms
- List: Acer cappadocicum subsp. lobelii (Ten.) A.E.Murray (1982); Acer pictum subsp. tenorei Pax (1886), not validly published; Acer platanoides var. lobelii (Ten.) Loudon (1838); Acer atheniense G.Gordon (1874); Acer cappadocicum var. dissectum (Wesm.) A.E.Murray (1977); Acer lobelii var. dissectum Wesm. in unknown publication; Acer lobelii f. striatum Schwer. (1893); Acer platanoides var. integrilobum Tausch (1829)

= Acer lobelii =

Species of maple

Acer lobelii, known as Lobel's maple or L'Obel's maple, or the Calabrian maple, is a rare species of maple (Acer) in the soapberry family Sapindaceae. It is native to southern Italy. It is named after the Flemish botanist Matthias de l'Obel. The species is closely related to Norway maple (Acer platanoides) and Cappadocian maple (Acer cappadocicum), and has often been treated as a subspecies of either of those, as Acer platanoides subsp. lobelii and Acer cappadocicum subsp. lobelii. More recently, it has been considered to be particularly close to the latter, which has also been confirmed by phylogenetic studies. Thus, A. lobelii most likely represents the westernmost member within the A. cappadocicum complex.

== Taxonomy ==
Acer lobelii is closely related to, and in some respects intermediate between, Acer cappadocicum, from southwestern Asia, and Acer platanoides, from further north in Europe, hence the synonyms cited above. The suggestion has even been made that it could be a natural hybrid between them. Nonetheless, A. lobelii is clearly very close to A. cappadocicum in particular: in one phylogenetic study by Nikzat-Siahkolaee and colleagues (2021), A. lobelii clustered fully between samples of A. cappadocicum, suggesting that the species is a western vicariant within that species, and making a treatment as a subspecies seem more appropriate. Still, as of April 2026, Plants of the World Online recognises it as an independent species.

== Description ==
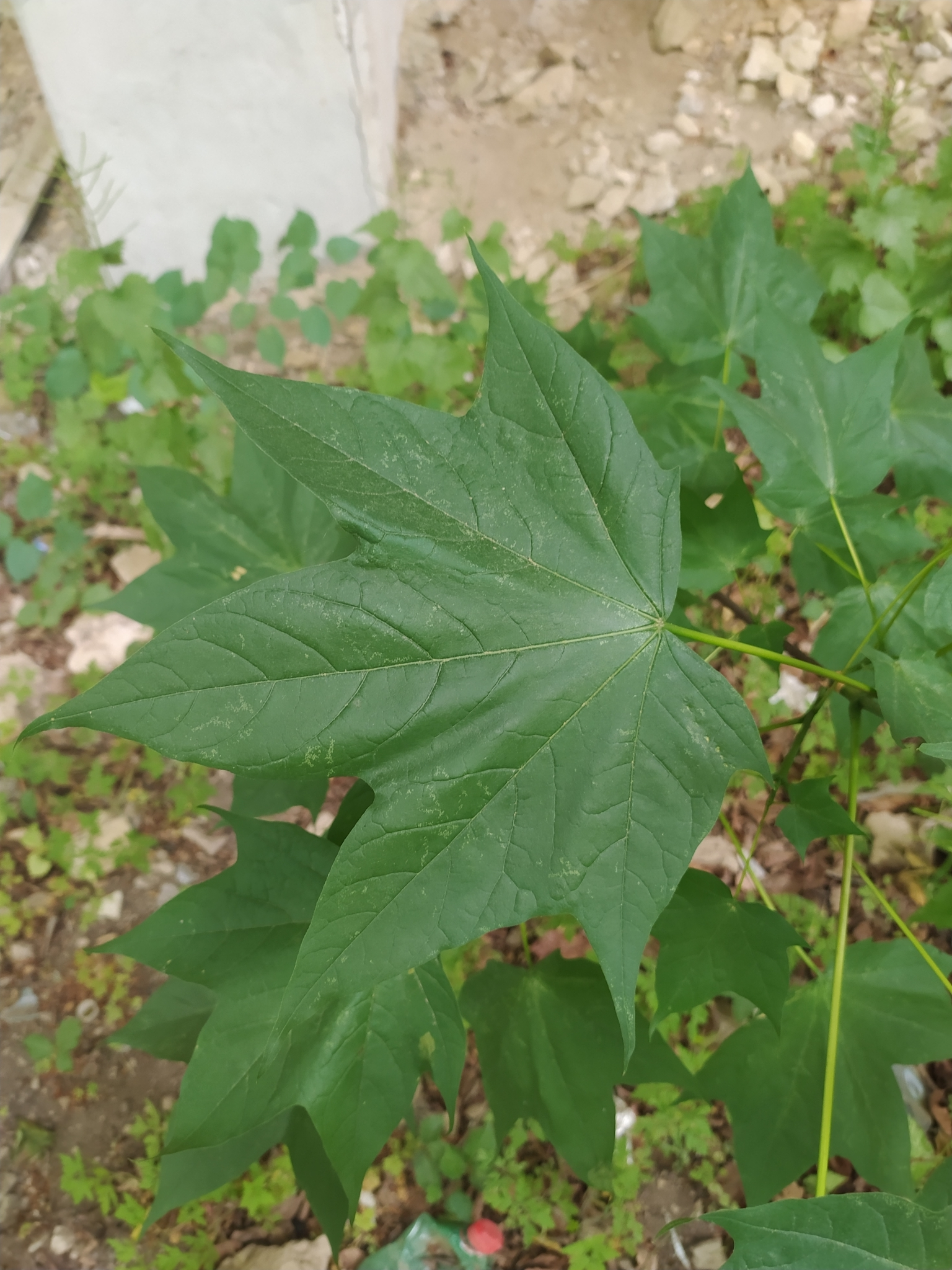
A. lobelii leaf

Acer lobelii is a medium-sized deciduous tree growing 20–25 metres (66–82 ft) tall. Trees in cultivation are often narrow, with an erect, fastigiate crown. The bark is greenish-grey, smooth in young trees, becoming browner and shallowly furrowed in mature trees. The shoots are often green covered by a thick glaucous blue-white wax at first, this wearing off within a year but the older shoots remaining green for several years.

The leaves are opposite, palmately lobed with five lobes, 6–12 centimetres (2.4–4.7 in) long and 6–15 centimetres (2.4–5.9 in) across; the lobes are entire or with one or two irregular teeth. As with its relatives Acer cappadocicum and Acer platanoides, the leaf stems bleed a milky latex when broken.

The flowers are in corymbs, yellow-green with five sepals 3–4 millimetres (0.12–0.16 in) long; flowering occurs in early spring. The fruit is a double samara with two winged seeds, the seeds are disc-shaped, strongly flattened, 6–11 millimetres (0.24–0.43 in) across and 2–3 millimetres (0.079–0.118 in) thick. The wings are 2.5 centimetres (0.98 in) long, widely spread, approaching a 180° angle.

Some of the features used to differentiate the species from its close relative A. cappadocicum have proven to be more variably pronounced than previously assumed, making them unreliable. While trees in cultivation are often distinctly narrow as compared to the usually rounder A. cappadocicum, the species can be more broad spreading in the wild, and A. cappadocicum can conversely be very upright as well. The glaucous bloom on young shoots, while more consistently shown by A. lobelii, can also be found in A. cappadocicum. Features that appear to more consistently distinguish A. lobelii from A. cappadocicum are the five rather than seven-lobed leaves of mature trees, shorter peduncles on its inflorescences, as well as the lack of a suckering habit in A. lobelii. Older A. lobelii in cultivation are, however, often grafted on A. cappadocicum, and may therefore have A. cappadocicum suckers surrounding them.

== Distribution ==
The species is rare and endangered in Italy, only occurring scattered in small groups in Italian sclerophyllous and semi-deciduous forest habitats between 200 and 1750 m altitude in the southern Apennine Mountain chain, particularly in beech forests. It is found in the Abruzzo, Basilicata, Calabria, Campania, Lazio and Molise provinces, reaching south into Sila National Park, Calabria. Some sources also consider it to be native to the western Balkans, however, this is unconfirmed, and may have its roots in an erroneous attribution.

== Cultivation and uses ==
Lobel's maple is grown as an ornamental tree in northern Europe, valued for its narrow crown which makes it suitable for planting in confined spaces. Many of the trees in cultivation are grafted on Acer cappadocicum rootstocks, shown by the numerous root sprouts with Acer cappadocicum foliage.

The horticultural hybrid maple Acer × zoeschense is often cited as having Acer lobelii as one of its parents, though more likely Acer cappadocicum.
