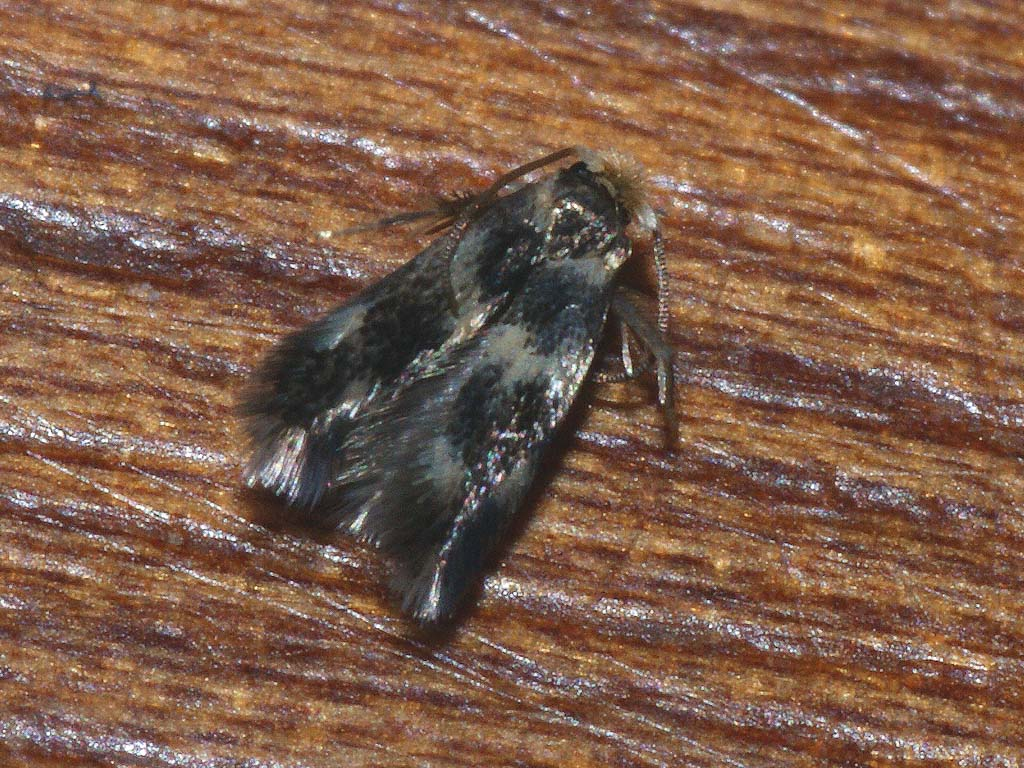

Scientific classification
- Kingdom: Animalia
- Phylum: Arthropoda
- Class: Insecta
- Order: Lepidoptera
- Family: Nepticulidae
- Genus: Ectoedemia
- Species: E. sericopeza

Binomial name
- Ectoedemia sericopeza (Zeller, 1839)

Synonyms
- List: Lyonetia sericopeza Zeller, 1839; Nepticula acerella Goureau, 1860; Tinea maryella Duponchel, 1843; Oecophora sericopezella Duponchel, 1843

= Ectoedemia sericopeza =

Species of moth

Ectoedemia sericopeza, the Norway maple seedminer, is a moth of the family Nepticulidae, found in Europe and North America. It was described by the German entomologist, Philipp Christoph Zeller in 1839.

== Description ==
The wingspan is 6–9 mm. Edward Meyrick gives this description: Head ferruginous-orange, collar ochreous-whitish. Antennal eyecaps ochreous-whitish. Forewings blackish; a basal spot, a bent fascia before middle, a tornal spot, and opposite costal spot yellow-whitish. Hindwings grey. The moths fly in May and August.

The larvae feed on Norway maple (Acer platanoides).

== Distribution ==
It is found from Fennoscandinavia to the Pyrenees, Italy, and Greece and from Great Britain to Russia and Ukraine. It is also present in North America, where it has been recorded from Delaware, Massachusetts, Ontario and Quebec.
