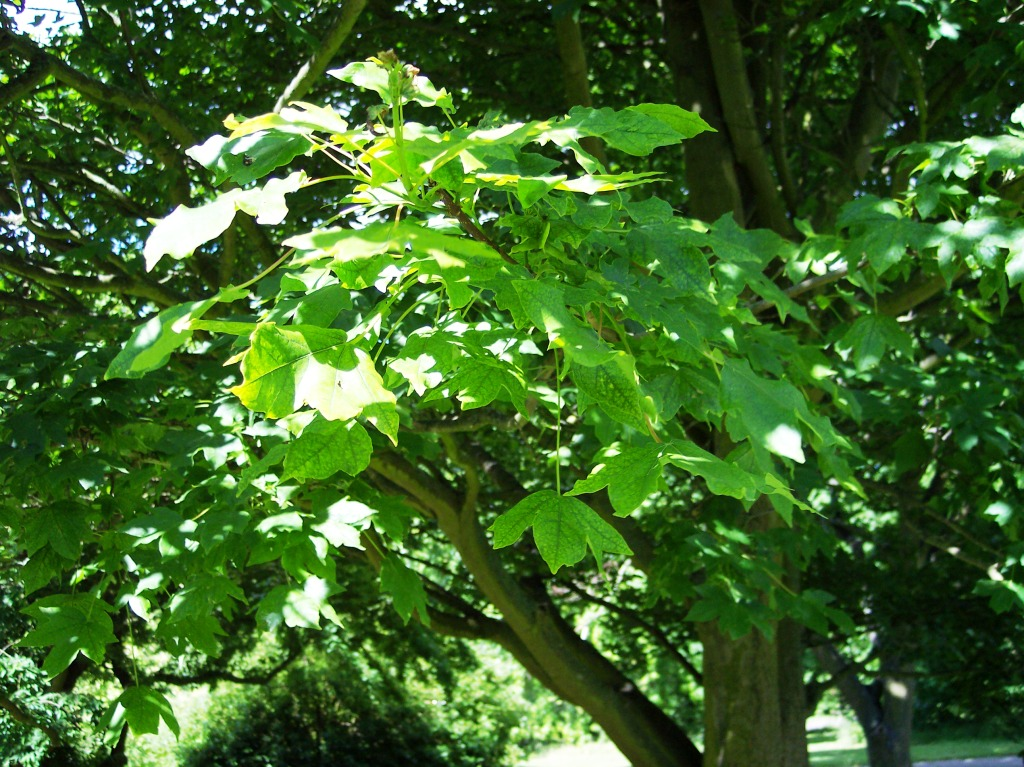

Scientific classification
- Kingdom: Plantae
- Clade: Tracheophytes
- Clade: Angiosperms
- Clade: Eudicots
- Clade: Rosids
- Order: Sapindales
- Family: Sapindaceae
- Genus: Acer
- Section: Acer sect. Platanoidea
- Species: A. × zoeschense

Binomial name
- Acer × zoeschense Pax

Synonyms
- A. neglectum Lange (non Hoffmannsegg)

= Acer × zoeschense =

Maple hybrid

Acer × zoeschense, the Zöschen maple, is a hybrid maple, a cross between Acer campestre (field maple), and either Acer lobelii (L'Obel's maple) or Acer cappadocicum (Cappadocian maple). While field maple parentage is universally accepted, the second parent is uncertain, though the tree's extensive production of root sprouts favours A. cappadocicum over A. lobelii. It takes its name from Zöschen Nurseries in Germany, where it first appeared as a garden hybrid (as opposed to a hybrid occurring in nature) at some time before 1870.

== Description ==
Acer × zoeschense is a medium-sized tree growing up to 20 m (66 feet) tall, and almost as wide. The shiny, five-lobed leaves are 10–11 cm long and up to 14 cm broad, dark green, often with purplish edges. The petioles produce a milky latex when broken. The flowers are produced in open corymbs 5–10 cm diameter, each flower small, pale yellow-green, with five sepals but no petals. The fruit is a paired samara 5 cm across; the two seeds are usually sterile.

== Cultivation ==
One cultivar, A. zoeschense 'Annae', was popular as a street tree in previous generations. In the United Kingdom, a mature and notable specimen of 'Annae' can be viewed in Westonbirt Arboretum. The Japanese cultivar, 'Kinka', has variegated foliage.
