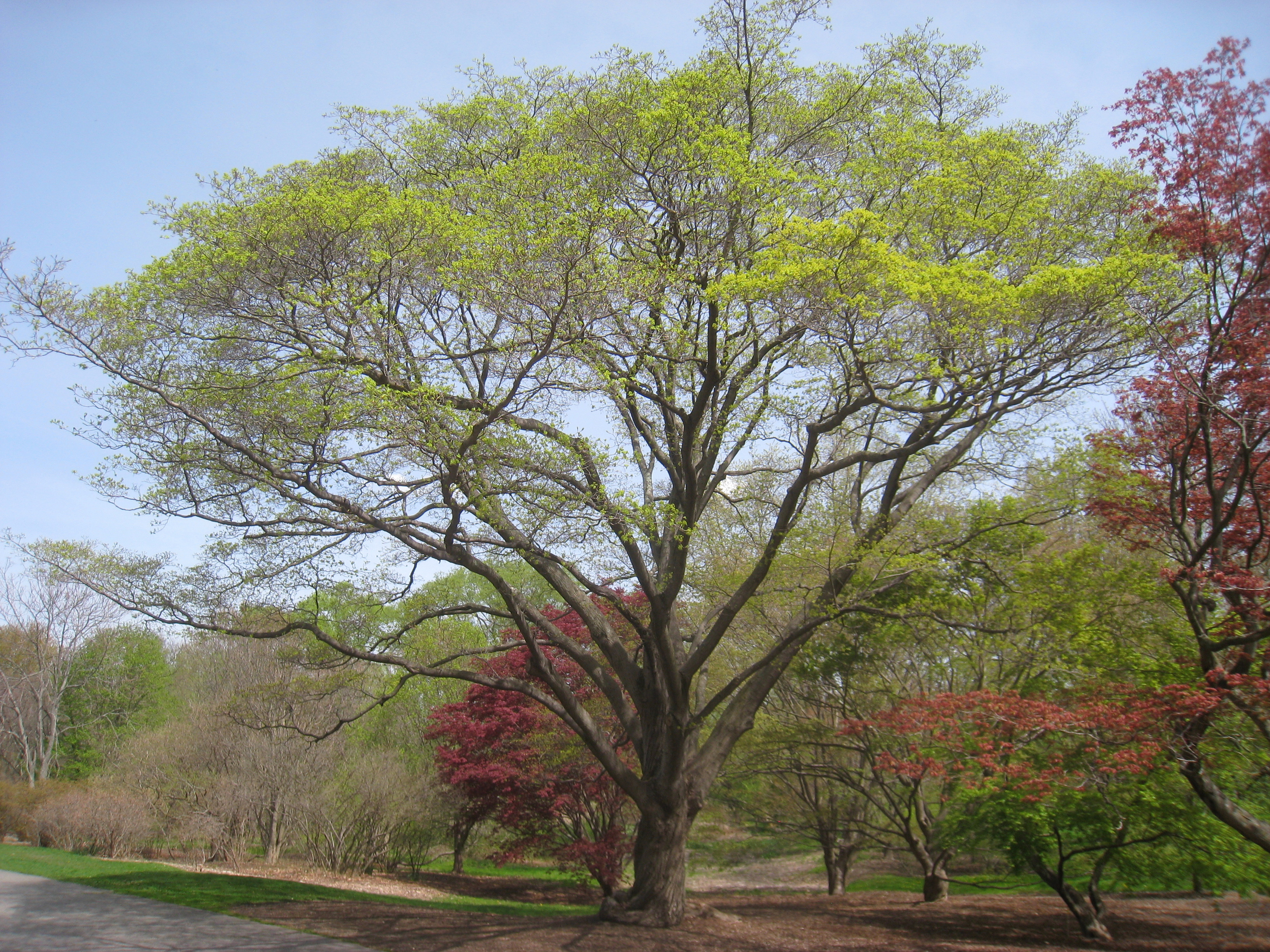

Scientific classification
- Kingdom: Plantae
- Clade: Tracheophytes
- Clade: Angiosperms
- Clade: Eudicots
- Clade: Rosids
- Order: Sapindales
- Family: Sapindaceae
- Genus: Acer
- Species: A. pictum
- Subspecies: A. p. subsp. mono

Trinomial name
- Acer pictum subsp. mono (Maxim.) H.Ohashi

= Acer pictum subsp. mono =

Subspecies of maple

Acer pictum subsp. mono, commonly known as painted maple or mono maple in English, itayakaede (板屋楓) or ezoitaya (蝦夷板屋) in Japan, wu jiao feng (五角楓) in China, or gorosoe (고로쇠) or gorosoenamu (고로쇠나무) in Korea, is a species of maple.

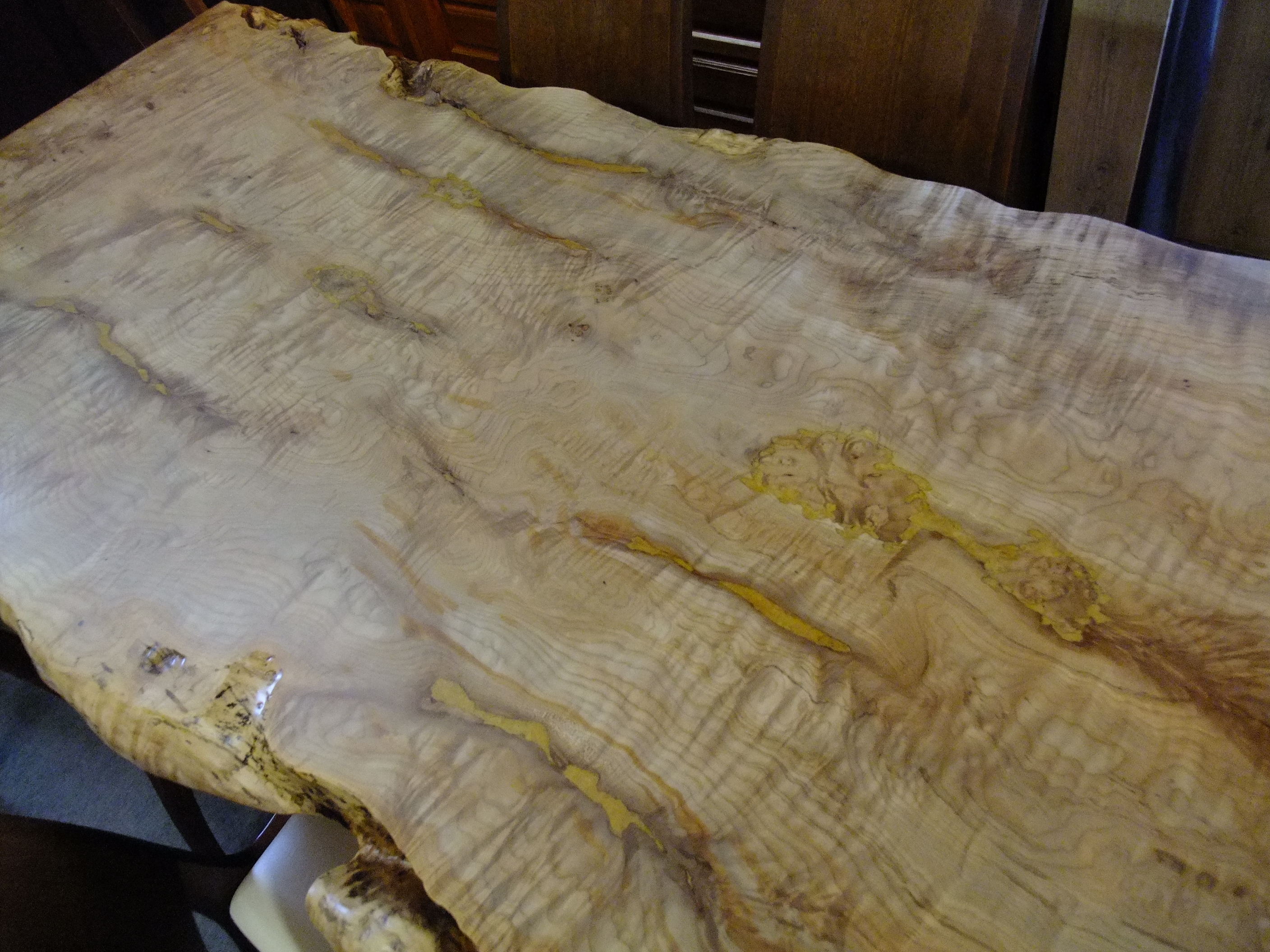
table

== Description ==
Acer pictum subsp. mono grows 15 to 20 meters (49 to 66 ft) tall and a trunk that is 60 to 100 centimeters (24 to 39 in) wide. Its leaves have 5-7 lobes. The crown is broad and symmetrical, which appeals to bonsai artists.

== Taxonomy ==
The taxonomy of A. mono is unresolved, with differing opinions on its name and identity. The tree has the following synonyms:

- Acer laetum var. parviflorum Regel
- Acer mono Maxim. (basionym)
- Acer pictum var. mono (Maxim.) Maxim. ex Franch.
- Acer truncatum subsp. mono (Maxim.) A. E. Murray

== Distribution and habitat ==
The tree is native to Japan, Korea, China, Mongolia, and the Russian Far East.
