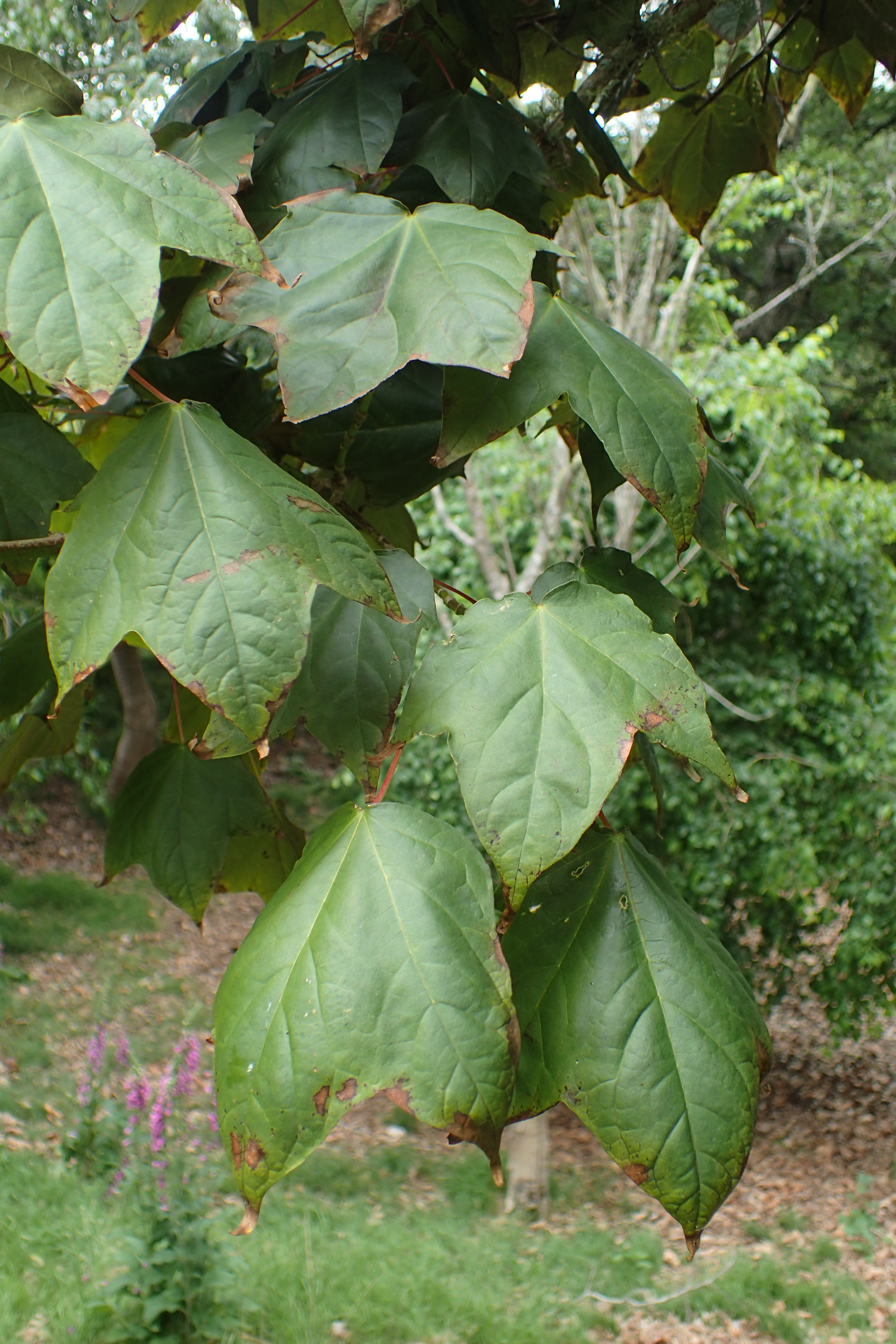
- Leaves of Acer amplum var. jianhuiense

Scientific classification
- Kingdom: Plantae
- Clade: Tracheophytes
- Clade: Angiosperms
- Clade: Eudicots
- Clade: Rosids
- Order: Sapindales
- Family: Sapindaceae
- Genus: Acer
- Section: Acer sect. Platanoidea
- Species: A. amplum

Binomial name
- Acer amplum Rehder 1911

Synonyms
- List: Acer acutum W.P.Fang 1932; Acer acutum var. quinquefidum W.P. Fang; Acer acutum var. tientungense W.P.Fang & M.Y.Fang; Acer amplum var. convexum (W.P.Fang) W.P.Fang; Acer amplum var. jianshuiense W.P.Fang; Acer bodinieri var. convexum W.P.Fang; Acer cappadocicum subsp. amplum (Rehder) A.E.Murray; Acer longipes subsp. amplum (Rehder) P.C.DeJong; Acer longipes var. hunanense W.P.Fang & W.K.Hu; Acer bodinieri H.Lév.; Acer catalpifolium Rehder; Acer chunii W.P.Fang; Acer tientaiense (C.K. Schneid.) Pojark.

= Acer amplum =

Species of maple

Acer amplum is an Asian species of maple found in Vietnam and China.

Acer amplum is a tree up to 25 meters tall with smooth brown or gray bark. Leaves are non-compound, heart-shaped, sometimes unlobed but other times with 3 or 5 lobes, the blade up to 25 cm long and about the same distance in width.

Subspecies

- Acer amplum subsp. amplum - Anhui, Fujian, Guangdong, Guangxi, Guizhou, Hubei, Hunan, Jiangxi, Sichuan, Yunnan, Zhejiang
- Acer amplum subsp. bodinieri (H.Lév.) Y.S.Chen - Guangxi, Guizhou, Hunan, Yunnan, Vietnam
- Acer amplum subsp. catalpifolium (Rehder) Y.S.Chen - Guangxi, Guizhou, Sichuan
- Acer amplum subsp. tientaiense (C.K.Schneid.) Y.S.Chen - Fujian, Jiangxi, Zhejiang
