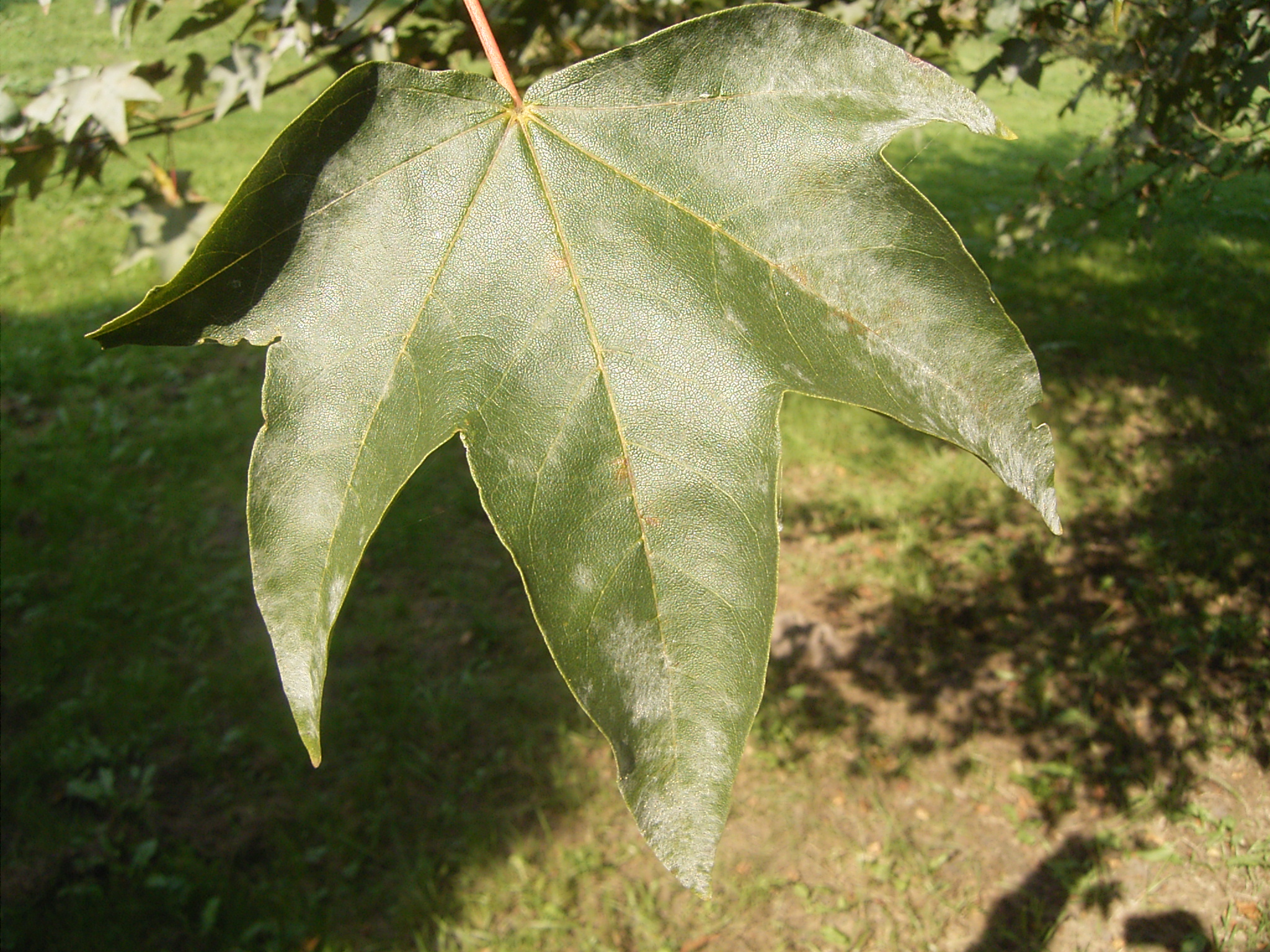

Conservation status
- Least Concern (IUCN 3.1)

Scientific classification
- Kingdom: Plantae
- Clade: Tracheophytes
- Clade: Angiosperms
- Clade: Eudicots
- Clade: Rosids
- Order: Sapindales
- Family: Sapindaceae
- Genus: Acer
- Section: Acer sect. Platanoidea
- Species: A. pictum

Binomial name
- Acer pictum Thunb. 1784

Synonyms
- List: Acer ambiguum Dippel 1892 not Heer 1878; Acer dippelii Schwer.; Acer latilobum (Koidz.) Koidz.; Acer marmoratum (G.Nicholson) H.Hara; Acer mayrii Schwer.; Acer mono Maxim.; Acer okamotoanum Nakai; Kalopanax pictus (Thunb.) Nakai

= Acer pictum =

Species of maple

Acer pictum, commonly known as yellow-paint maple, is an Asian species of maple. It widespread across much of China as well as Korea, Japan, Mongolia, and eastern Russia. Its natural habitat is in temperate forests.

Acer pictum is a deciduous tree up to 20 meters tall, with gray bark. Leaves are non-compound, thin, up to 12 cm wide and 12 cm across, toothless, with 3, 5, 7, or 9 lobes.

== Taxonomy ==
Acer pictum is taxonomically complex species, showing morphological variation that corresponds to different geographic regions. Treatments of this variation have ranged from recognizing entities at the species level, to uniting them all under an undivided A. pictum. Further taxonomic study of this group is needed. Five subspecies are provisionally recognized in the Flora of China. These are:

- Acer pictum subsp. macropterum - China
- Acer pictum subsp. mono - China, Japan, Korea, Mongolia, and east Russia
- Acer pictum subsp. pictum - Japan and Korea
- Acer pictum subsp. pubigerum - China
- Acer pictum subsp. tricuspis - China
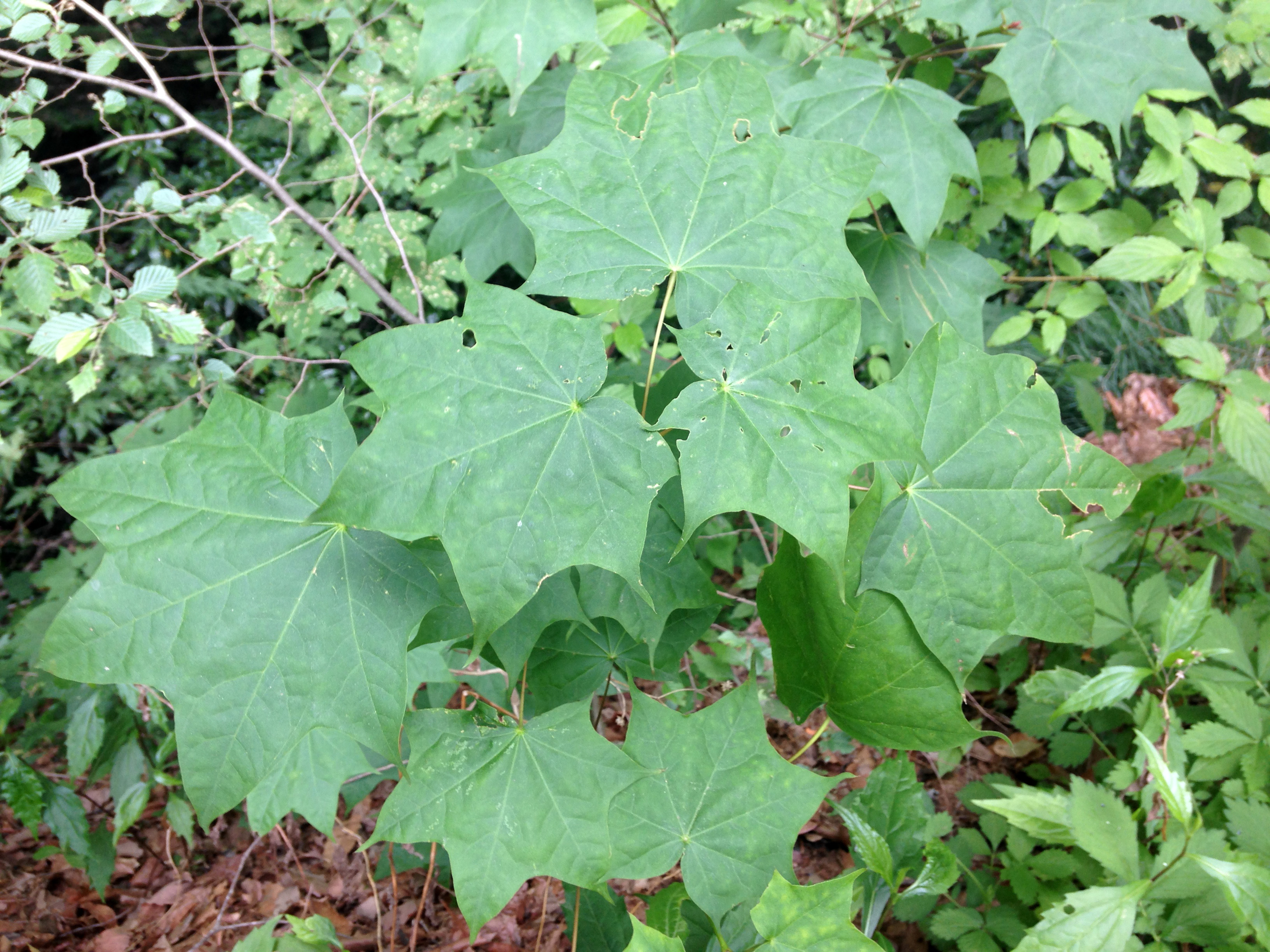
A sapling of Acer pictum in the wild
