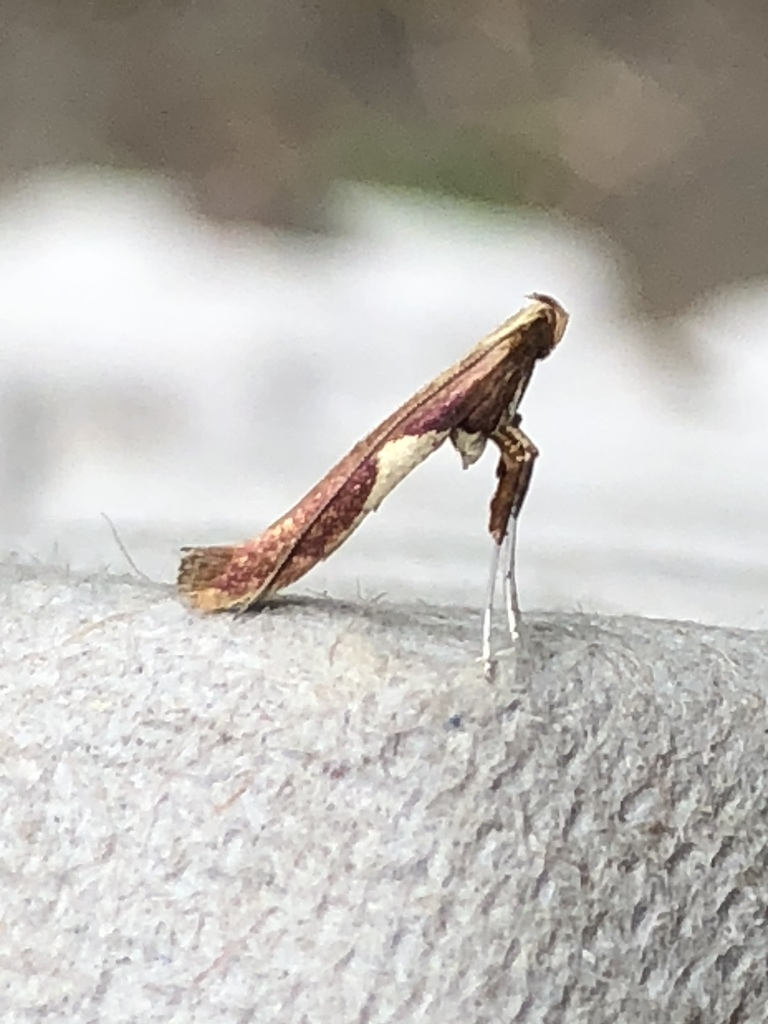

Scientific classification
- Kingdom: Animalia
- Phylum: Arthropoda
- Clade: Pancrustacea
- Class: Insecta
- Order: Lepidoptera
- Family: Gracillariidae
- Genus: Caloptilia
- Species: C. coroniella

Binomial name
- Caloptilia coroniella (Clemens, 1864)

= Caloptilia coroniella =

Species of moth

Caloptilia coroniella is a moth of the family Gracillariidae. It is known from Canada (Québec and Nova Scotia) and the United States (Maryland, Pennsylvania, Maine, Michigan, Connecticut, Vermont and Illinois).

The larvae feed on Betula species, including Betula nana, Betula papyrifera, Betula populifolia and Betula pubescens. They mine the leaves of their host plant.
