= Dieback =

Dieback may refer to a number of plant problems and diseases including:

- Forest dieback caused by acid rain, heavy metal pollution, or imported pathogens
- The death of regions of a plant or similar organism caused by physical damage, such as from pruning
- Those caused by the genus Eutypa, such as Eutypa dieback
- Those caused by the genus Phytophthora, such as Phytophthora cinnamomi dieback
- Those caused by the genus Seiridium, such as Seiridium cardinale dieback or cypress canker
- Birch dieback, caused by several pathogens
- Ash dieback, caused by Hymenoscyphus fraxineus
- Lettuce dieback
- Maize/corn anthracnose top dieback
