= Weeping tree =

Tree with a weeping habit

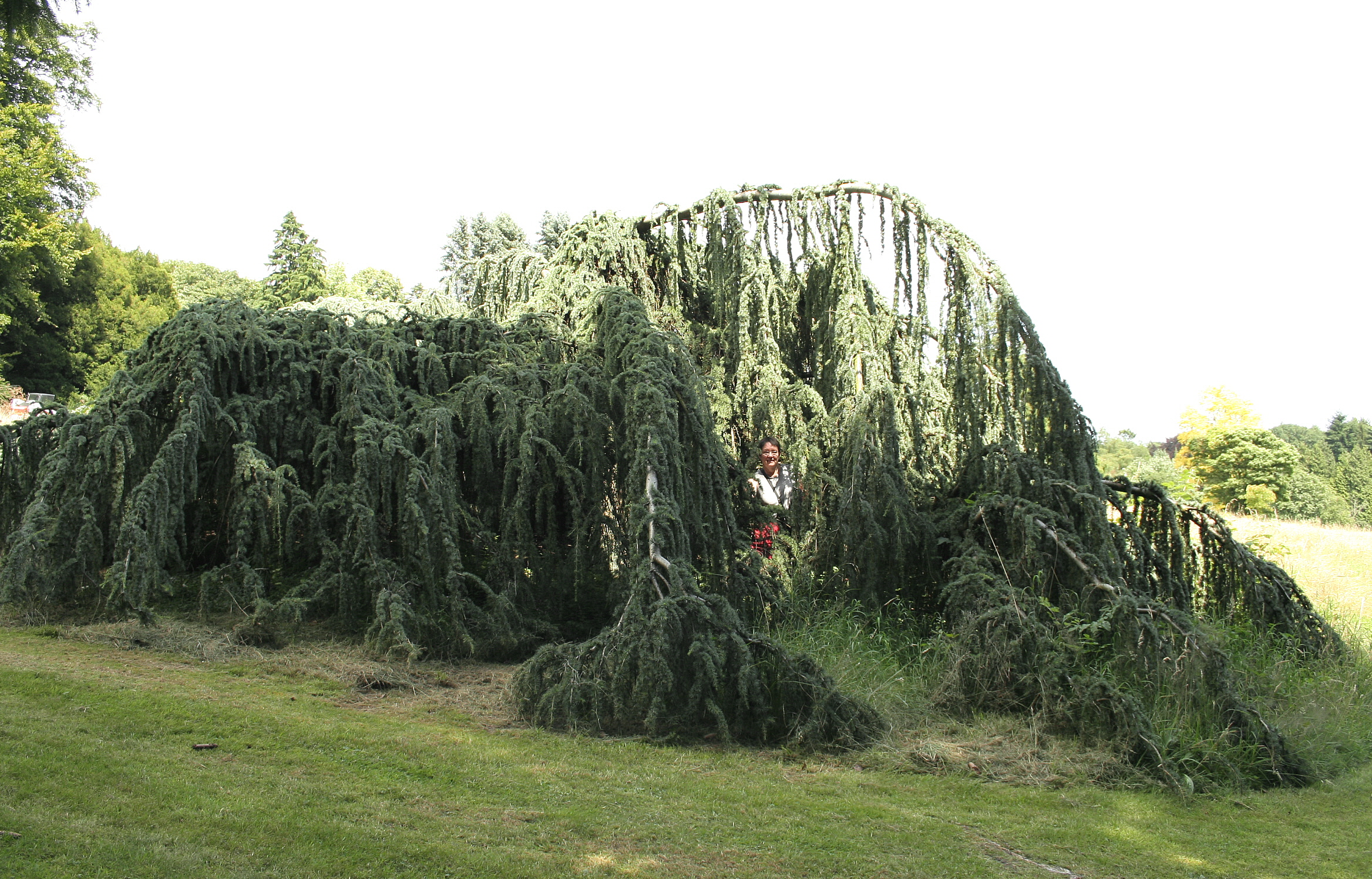
Weeping Atlas Cedar

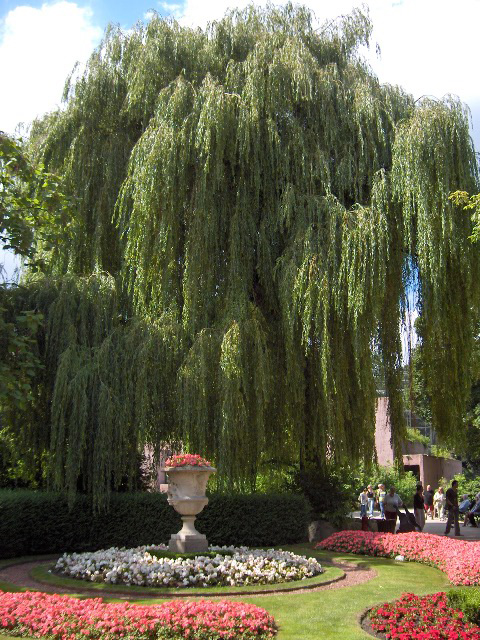
Golden weeping willow: Salix Sepulcralis Group 'Chrysocoma'

Weeping trees are trees characterized by soft, limp twigs. This characterization may lead to a bent crown and pendulous branches that can cascade to the ground. While weepiness occurs in nature, most weeping trees are cultivars. Because of their shape, weeping trees are popular in landscaping; generally they need a lot of space and are solitary so that their effect is more pronounced. There are over a hundred different types of weeping trees. Some trees, such as the cherry, have a variety of weeping cultivars. There are currently around 550 weeping cultivars in 75 different genera, although many have now disappeared from cultivation.

== List of weeping trees ==
=== Weeping conifers ===
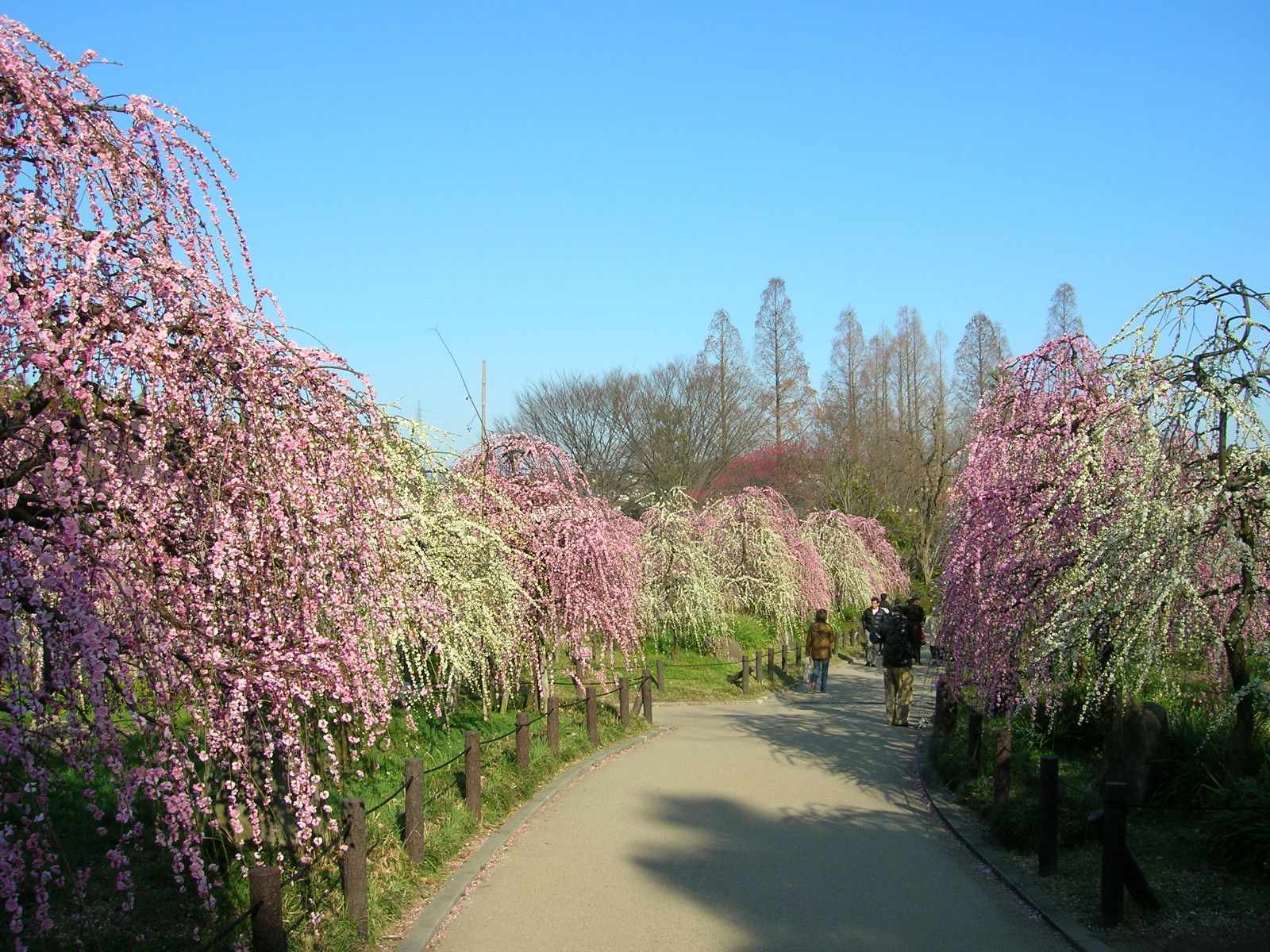
Weeping Flowering Apricot

- Cedrus atlantica 'Glauca Pendula', Weeping Blue Atlas Cedar
- Cupressus nootkatensis 'Pendula', Weeping Nootka Cypress
- Cupressus nootkatensis 'Pendula Vera', True Weeping Nootka Cypress
- Cupressus sempervirens 'Pendula', Weeping Mediterranean Cypress
- Juniperus virginiana 'Pendula', Weeping eastern red cedar
- Juniperus scopulorum 'Tolleson's Blue Weeping', Tolleson's Blue Weeping Juniper
- Larix decidua 'Pendula', Weeping European Larch
- Picea abies 'Inversa', Inversed Norway Spruce
- Picea abies 'Pendula', Weeping Norway Spruce
- Picea breweriana, Brewer's Weeping Spruce
- Picea glauca 'Pendula', Weeping white spruce
- Picea omorika 'Pendula', Weeping Serbian Spruce
- Pinus strobus 'Pendula', weeping eastern white pine
- Pinus patula, Mexican Weeping Pine
- Sequoiadendron giganteum 'Pendulum', Weeping giant sequoia

=== Weeping broadleaf trees ===
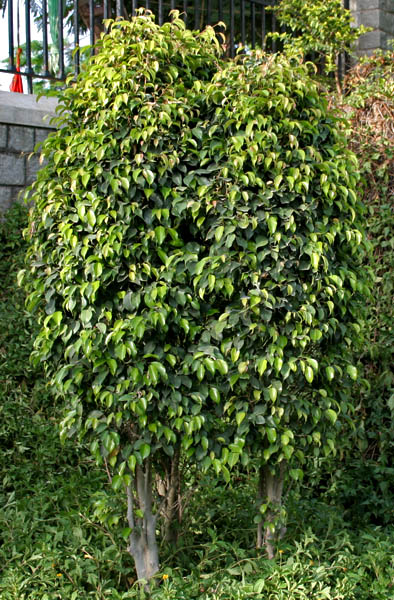
Weeping fig

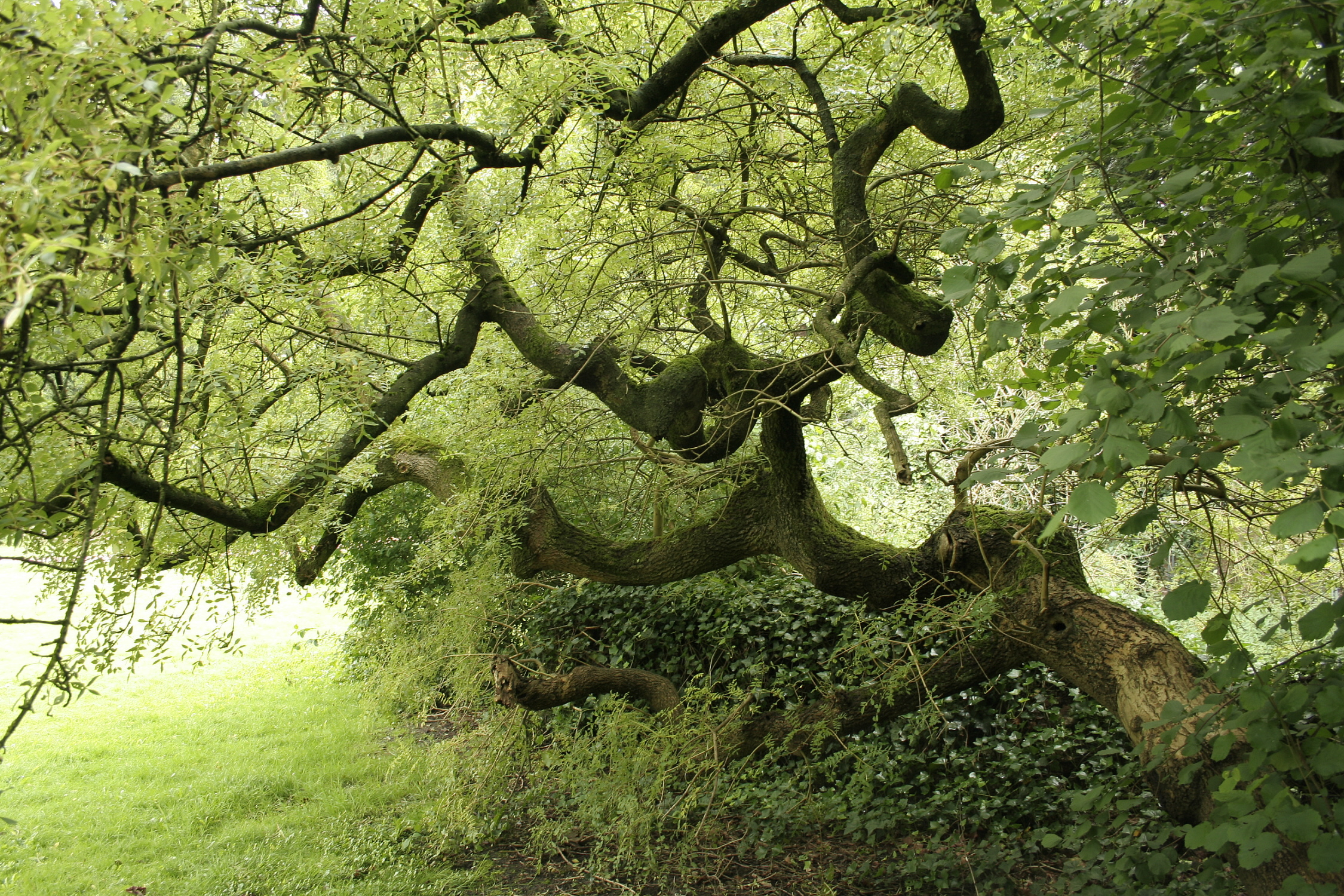
Weeping Ash

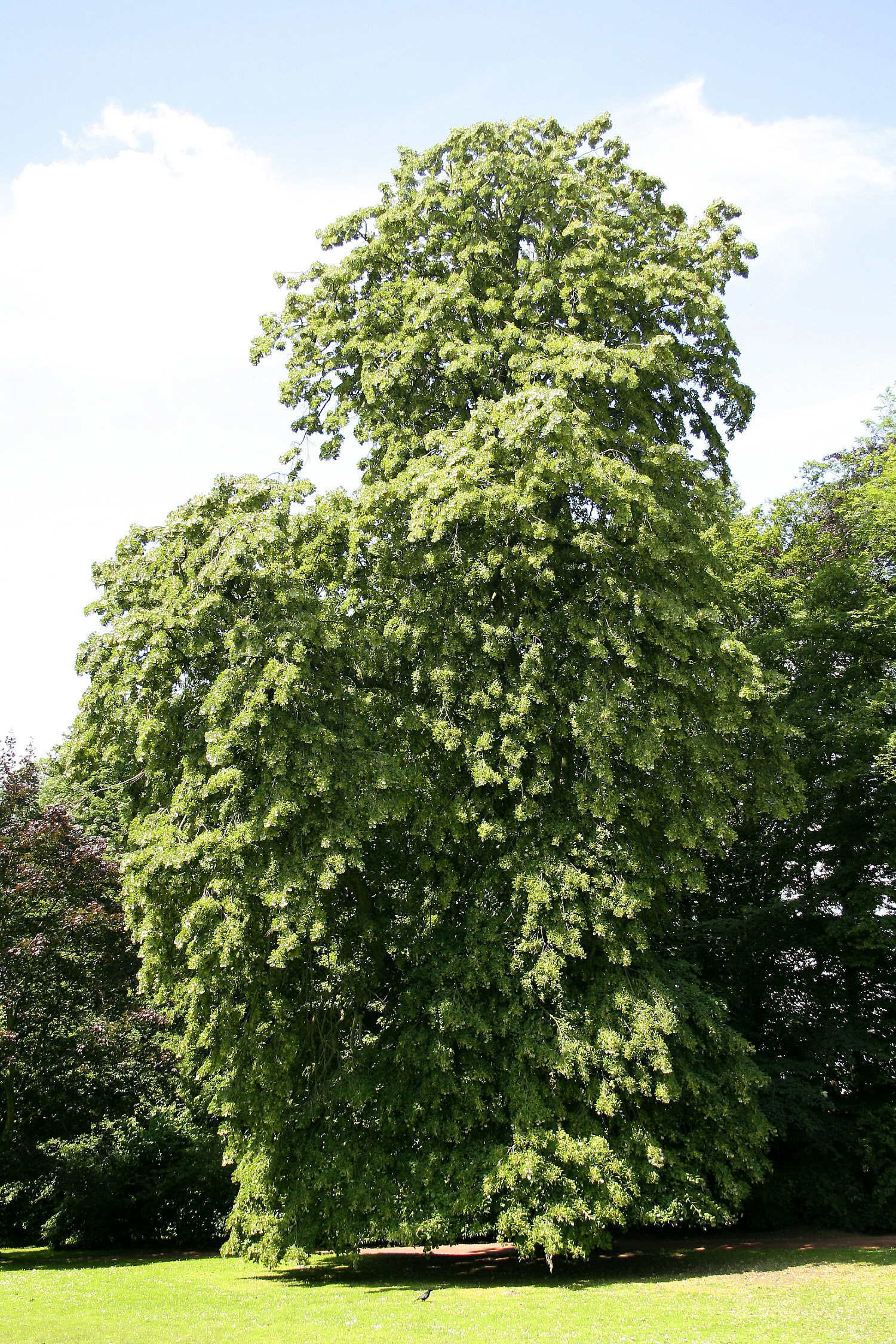
Weeping Silver Linden

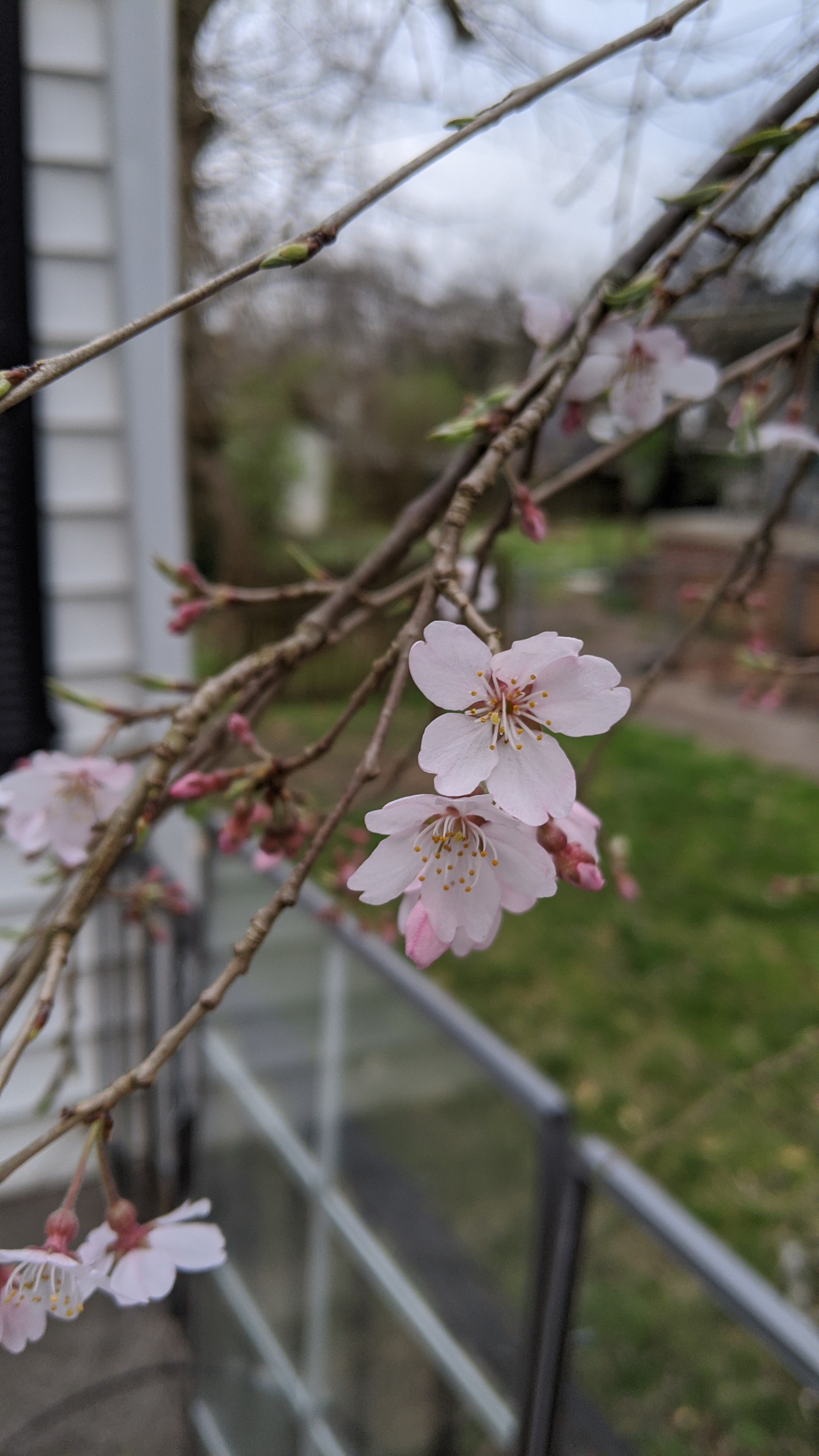
- Weeping Cherry blossoms
  Acer campestre 'Eastleigh Weeping', Weeping Eastleigh Field Maple
- Acer campestre 'Pendulum', Weeping Field Maple
- Acer campestre 'Puncticulatum', Weeping Speckled Field Maple
- Acer negundo 'Pendulum', Weeping Boxelder Maple
- Acer platanoides 'Pendulum', Weeping Norway Maple
- Acer pseudoplatanus 'Pendulum', Weeping Sycamore
- Aesculus (Carnea Group) 'Pendula', Weeping Red Horse Chestnut
- Amorpha fruticosa 'Pendula', Weeping Desert False Indigo
- Aspidosperma quebracho-blanco 'Pendula', Weeping White Quebracho
- Betula pendula 'Youngii', Young's Weeping Birch
- Betula pubescens 'Pendula', Weeping Downy Birch
- Betula pubescens 'Pendula Nana', Gazebo Downy Birch
- Cercidiphyllum japonicum 'Pendulum', Weeping Katsura
- Fagus sylvatica 'Pendula', Weeping Beech
- Ficus benjamina, weeping fig
- Fraxinus angustifolia 'Pendula Vera', True Weeping Narrow-leafed Ash
- Fraxinus excelsior 'Pendula', Weeping Ash
- Ilex aquifolium 'Pendula', Weeping Holly
- Malus 'Louisa', 'Louisa' Weeping Crabapple
- Melaleuca leucadendra, Weeping Tea tree
- Morus alba 'Chaparral', Chaparral Weeping Mulberry
- Morus alba 'Pendula', Dwarf Weeping Mulberry
- Prunus itosakura 'Pendula' (syn. Prunus spachiana 'Pendula'), Weeping Japanese Cherry
- Prunus itosakura 'Pendula Rosea' (syn. Prunus spachiana 'Pendula Rosea'), Weeping Spring Cherry
- Prunus itosakura 'Pendula Rubra' (syn. Prunus spachiana 'Pendula Rubra'), Red Weeping Spring Cherry
- Prunus mume 'Pendula', Weeping Flowering Apricot
- Prunus × subhirtella 'Pendula Plena Rosea', Weeping Higan Cherry
- Pyrus salicifolia 'Pendula', Weeping Willow-leaved Pear
- Salix babylonica 'Babylon', Weeping Willow
- Salix Sepulcralis Group 'Chrysocoma', Golden weeping Willow
- Styphnolobium japonicum 'Pendulum', Weeping Pagoda Tree
- Tilia tomentosa 'Petiolaris', Weeping silver Linden
- Ulmus glabra 'Camperdownii', Camperdown Elm
- Waterhousea floribunda 'Sweeper', Weeping Lilly Pilly

== See also ==
- List of trees and shrubs by taxonomic family
