= Aspidosperma quebracho-blanco 'Pendula' =

- Genus: Aspidosperma
- Species: Aspidosperma quebracho-blanco
- Cultivar: 'Pendula'
- Origin: Argentina

Aspidosperma quebracho-blanco 'Pendula', or weeping white quebracho, is a weeping tree and a cultivar of Aspidosperma quebracho-blanco, the White Quebracho. It was first described by Spegazzini from Santiago del Estero, Argentina in 1910. No trees are known to survive of this cultivar.

== Description ==
A weeping tree with a leader and with arching branches hanging down.

== Accessions ==
This cultivar does not seem to have been cultivated outside Argentina. It was first found in a natural population. No trees are known to survive though it may still occur wild.

== Synonymy ==
- Aspidosperma quebracho-blanco var. pendula Speg. (1910)
