= Claret ash =

Variety of tree

Fraxinus angustifolia 'Raywood'
- Genus: Fraxinus
- Species: Fraxinus angustifolia
- Subspecies: oxycarpa
- Cultivar: 'Raywood'
- Origin: South Australia, c. 1910

Fraxinus angustifolia subsp. oxycarpa 'Raywood', known as claret ash or Raywood ash is a cultivar of ash, a seedling variant of Caucasian ash, Fraxinus angustifolia subsp. oxycarpa. It is distinctive in its leaves turning to a dark red colour in autumn.

== History ==
The original seedling was discovered near a group of assorted ash trees in Sewell's nursery in the Mount Lofty Ranges in South Australia about 1910, and later grown at the nearby property, "Raywood" (former home of the Downer family). Tullie Cornthwaite Wollaston (1863–1931), an opal dealer, is credited with its discovery and propagation in the now heritage-listed garden there.

In 1937, claret ash trees were planted along the central reservation and verges of Anzac Highway in Adelaide when it was redeveloped into a dual carriageway.

The tree was introduced to cultivation in Britain in 1928 and to North America in 1956, although it did not become widely available there until 1979.

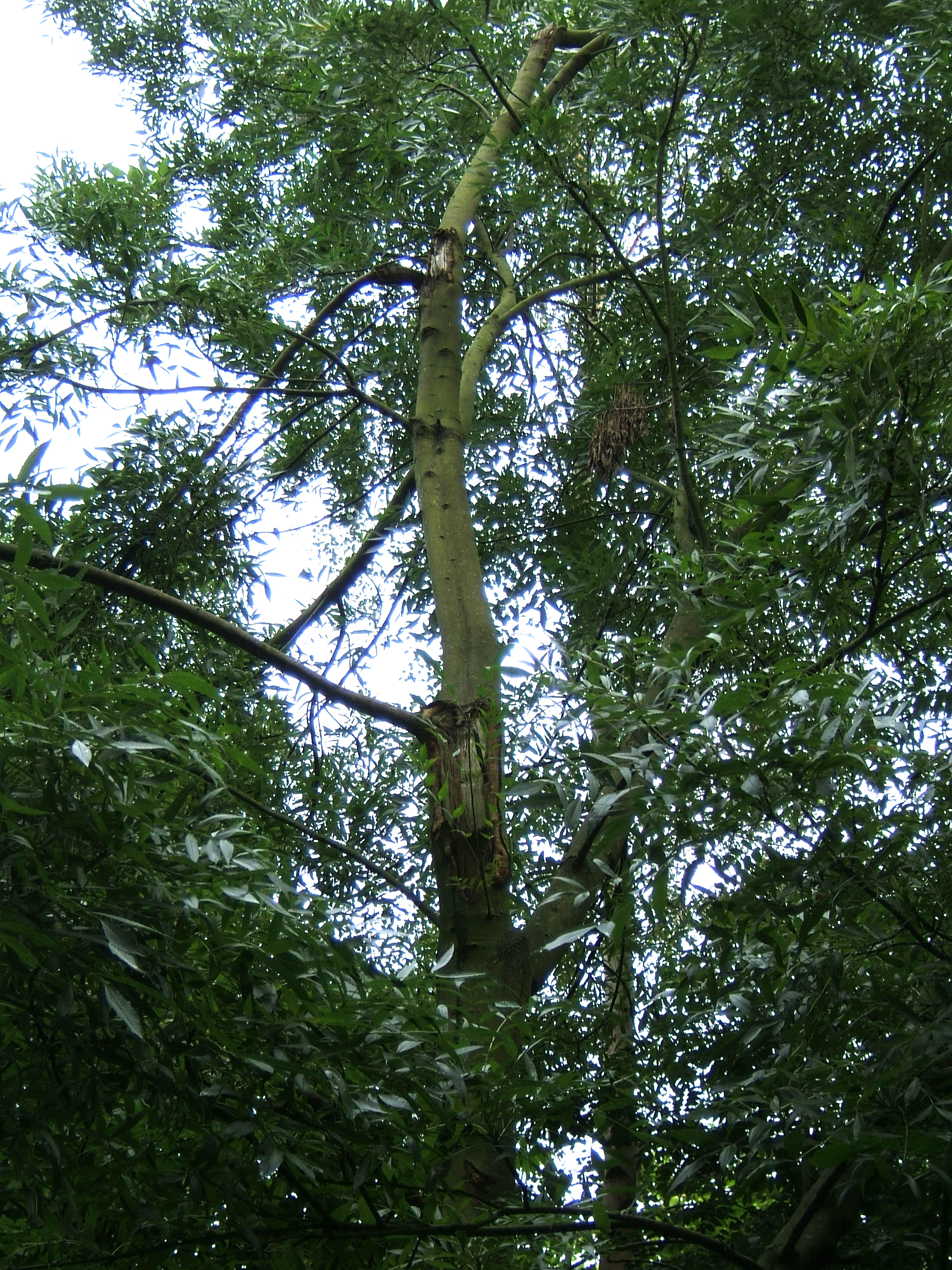
Claret Ash, Northumberland, England

== Description ==
Claret ash is a cultivar of Caucasian ash, derived from a natural seedling variant. Caucasian ash is a subspecies of narrow-leaved ash, Fraxinus angustifolia.

Claret ash grows to around 15–20 m (49–66 ft) and has dark green leaves that turn to a dark red claret in the autumn. The bark of the tree is notably smoother than other Caucasian ash trees, which is quite apparent on those claret ash trees that have been grafted onto a Caucasian ash rootstock. In Australia and the United States a decline or dieback in some older trees has been observed, which has been attributed to a combination of environmental stress and the presence of the fungus Botryosphaeria.
