= Betula pubescens 'Pendula' =

Flowering plant cultivar

- Genus: Betula
- Species: Betula pubescens
- Cultivar: 'Pendula'
- Origin: Germany

Betula pubescens 'Pendula', or Weeping Downy Birch, is a weeping tree and a cultivar of Betula pubescens, the Downy Birch. It was first described by Schelle in 1903. No trees are known to survive of this cultivar.

== Description ==
A weeping tree with a leader and with pendulous branches.

== Accessions ==
Very little is known of this cultivar and it never seems to have been widely cultivated.

== Synonymy ==
- Betula pubescens f. pendula Schelle in L.Beissner, E.Schelle & H.Zabel, Handb. Laubholzben.: 53 (1903), nom. nud.
