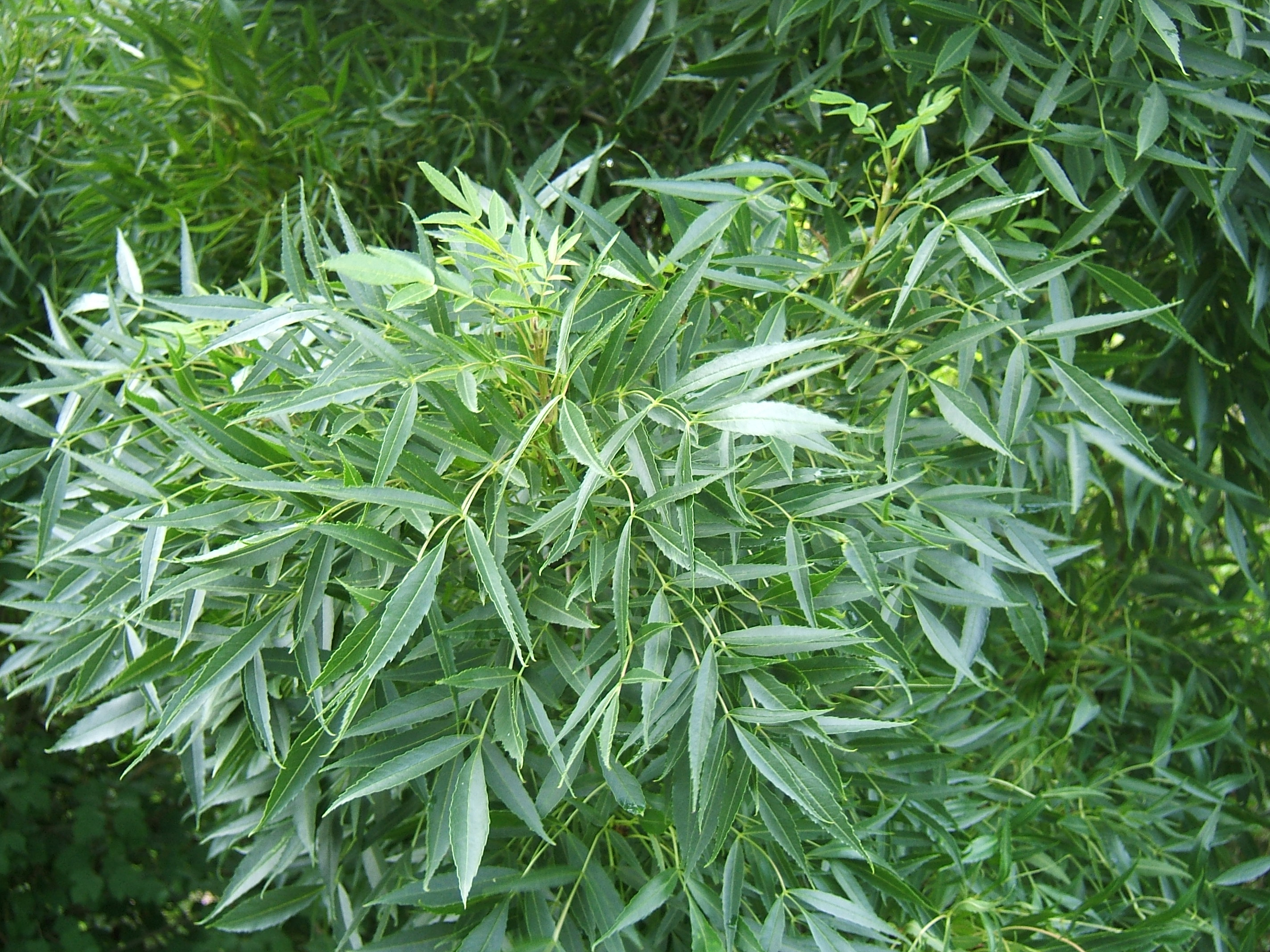
- Foliage of subsp. oxycarpa

Conservation status
- Least Concern (IUCN 3.1)

Scientific classification
- Kingdom: Plantae
- Clade: Tracheophytes
- Clade: Angiosperms
- Clade: Eudicots
- Clade: Asterids
- Order: Lamiales
- Family: Oleaceae
- Genus: Fraxinus
- Section: Fraxinus sect. Fraxinus
- Species: F. angustifolia

Binomial name
- Fraxinus angustifolia Vahl
- Distribution map

Synonyms
- F. lentiscifolia (Desf.); F. oxycarpa Willd.; F. parvifolia Lam.; F. rotundifolia Mill.

= Fraxinus angustifolia =

Species of flowering plant

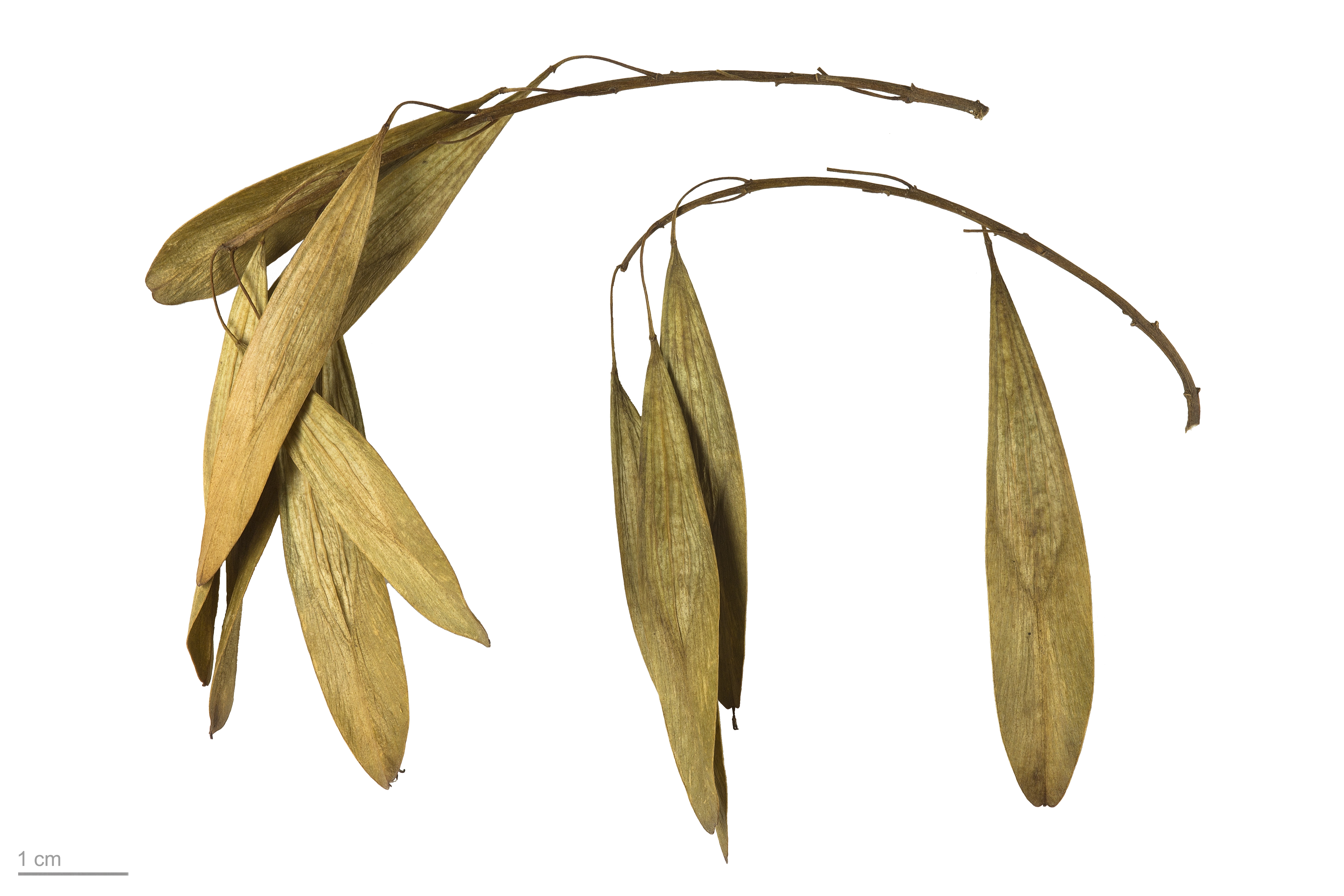
Fraxinus angustifolia – MHNT

Fraxinus angustifolia, the narrow-leaved ash, is a species of Fraxinus native to Central Europe and Southern Europe, Northwest Africa, and Southwest Asia.

== Description ==
It is a medium-sized deciduous tree growing to 20–30 m tall with a trunk up to 1.5 m diameter. The bark is smooth and pale grey on young trees, becoming square-cracked and knobbly on old trees. The buds are pale brown, which readily distinguishes it from the related Fraxinus excelsior (black buds) even in winter. The leaves are in opposite pairs or whorls of three, pinnate, 15–25 cm long, with 3–13 leaflets; the leaflets being distinctively slender, 3–8 cm long and 1–1.5 cm broad. The flowers are produced in inflorescences which can be male, hermaphrodite or mixed male and hermaphrodite. The male and hermaphrodite flowers occur on all individuals, i.e. all trees are functionally hermaphrodite. Flowering occurs in early spring. The fruit when fully formed is a samara 3–4 cm long, the seed 1.5–2 cm long with a pale brown wing 1.5–2 cm long.

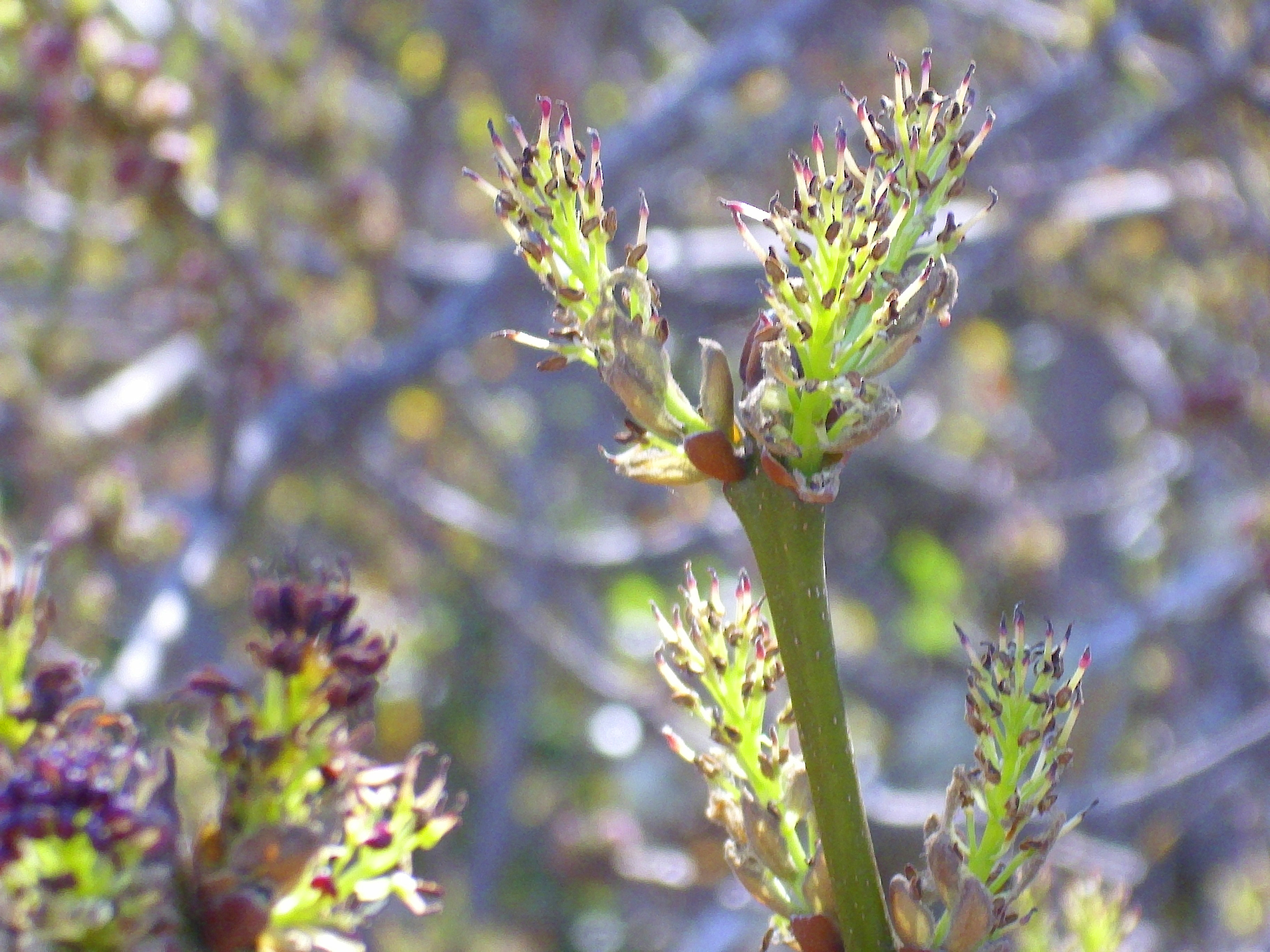
Fraxinus angustifolia inflorescence

== Variation ==
There are four subspecies, treated as distinct species by some authors:

- Fraxinus angustifolia subsp. angustifolia. Western Europe north to France, northwest Africa. Leaves with 7–13 leaflets; leaflets hairless beneath.
- Fraxinus angustifolia subsp. oxycarpa (M.Bieb. ex Willd.) Franco & Rocha Afonso (syn. F. oxycarpa M.Bieb. ex Willd.). Caucasian ash. Eastern Europe north to the Czech Republic, southwest Asia east to northern Iran. Leaves with 3–9 leaflets; leaflets with white hairs on the lower half of the midribs.
- Fraxinus angustifolia subsp. syriaca Middle East and West Asia.
- Fraxinus angustifolia subsp. danubialis (described by Zdeněk Pouzar) Middle Europe (also called F. angustifolia subsp. pannonica Soó & Simon).

== Cultivars ==
Of Fraxinus angustifolia subsp. angustifolia:

- 'Pendula Vera', true weeping narrow-leaved ash.

Of Fraxinus angustifolia subsp. oxycarpa:

- 'Raywood'. This cultivar is commonly planted as an ornamental tree in temperate regions. It has notable autumn colour, but has the major drawback of very brittle branches.

== Uses ==
In Sicily, it is cultivated as a source of a plant sap product called manna (see Fraxinus ornus).

== Weed potential ==
Fraxinus angustifolia subsp. angustifolia has become a weed in many parts of Australia, where it is known as Desert Ash. It has been widely planted as a street and park tree, and has spread to native bushland and grasslands, as well as stream banks and drainage lines, out-competing native plants for moisture, light and nutrients.

It was for this reason that in the 1930’s that a breeding programme was commissioned to produce a sterile deciduous tree that could handle the tough conditions in temperate Australia, the results of which were highly successful. In honour of the nursery in Aldgate, Adelaide Hills, South Australia that was responsible for the development, the Raywood Nursery, the new species was named Raywood ash. It is also known as Claret ash.

It has been declared an invasive species in South Africa.

== Gallery ==
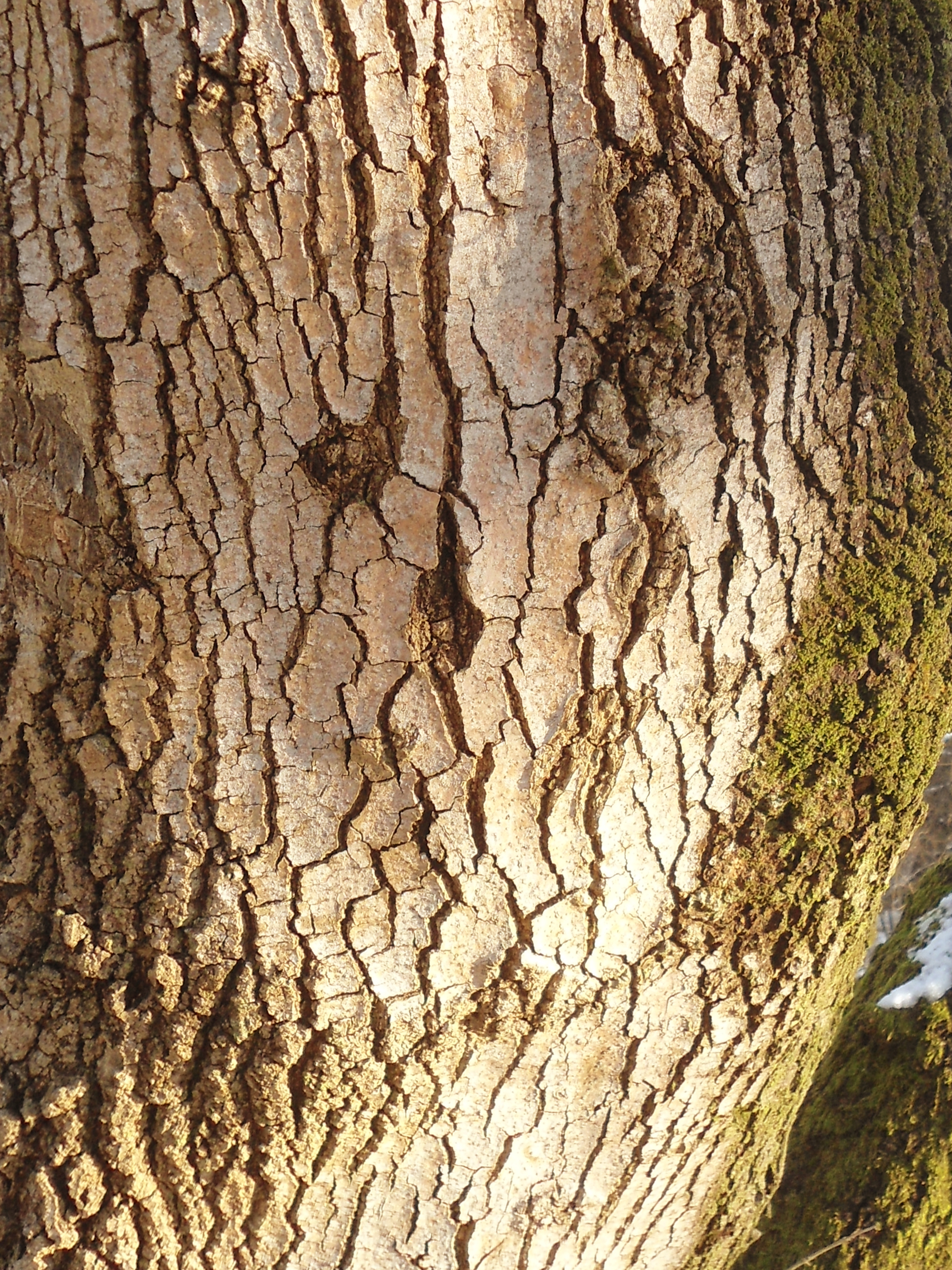
Bark

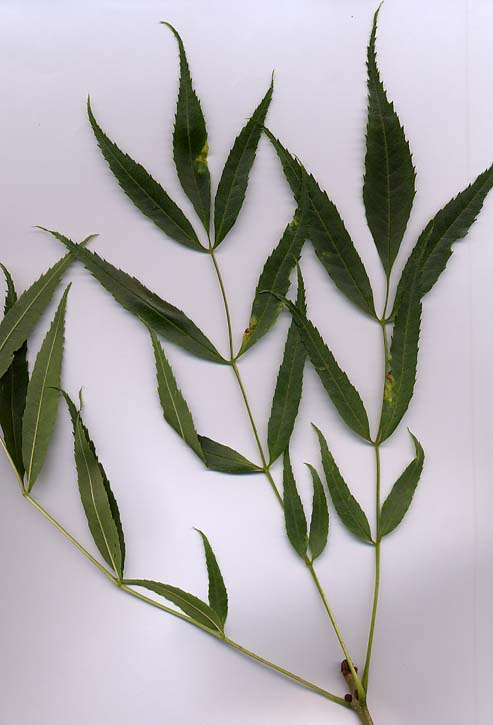
Leaves of subsp. oxycarpa

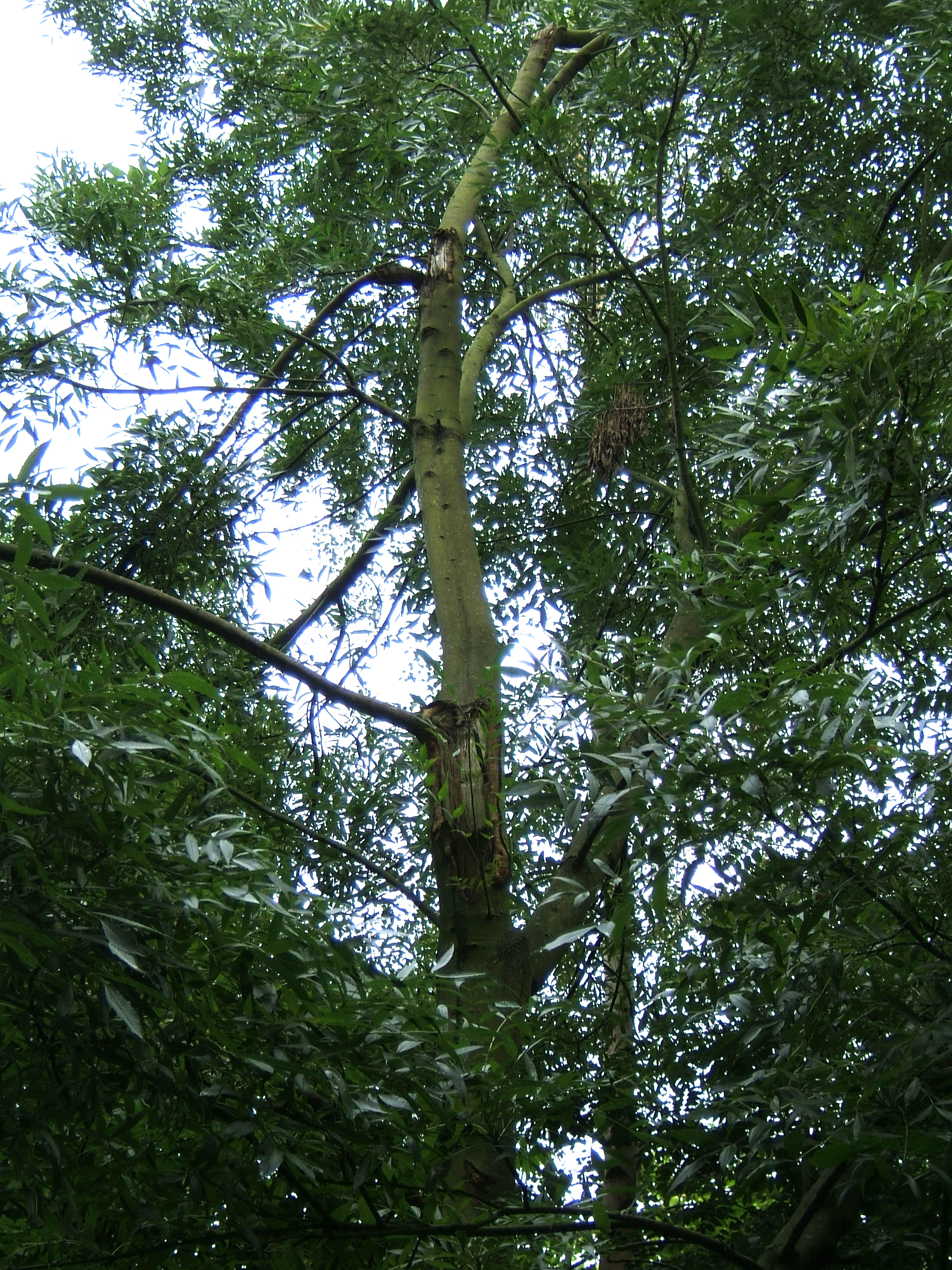
Specimen of 'Raywood', typically showing several broken branches

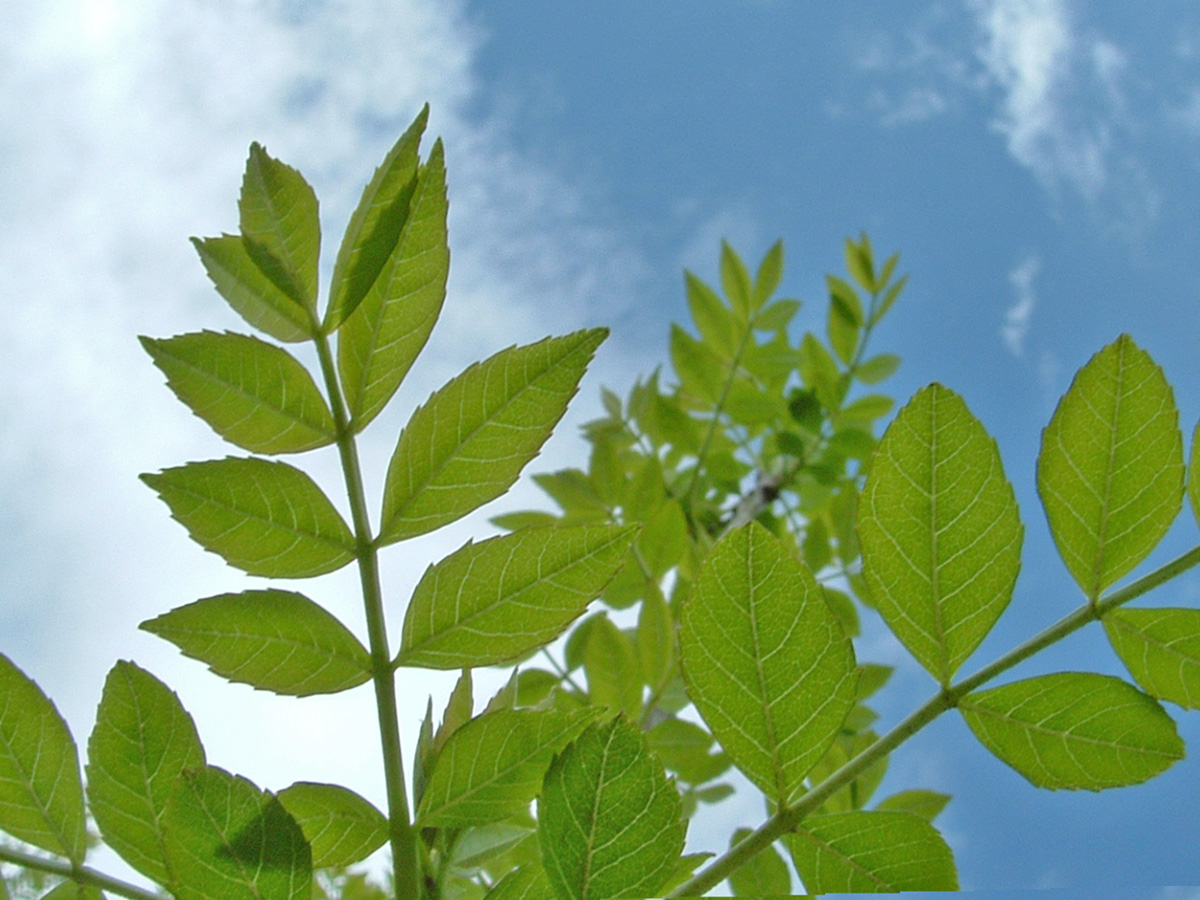
Young spring leaves of subsp. angustifolia, known as Desert Ash in Australia, where it is classed as a weed.

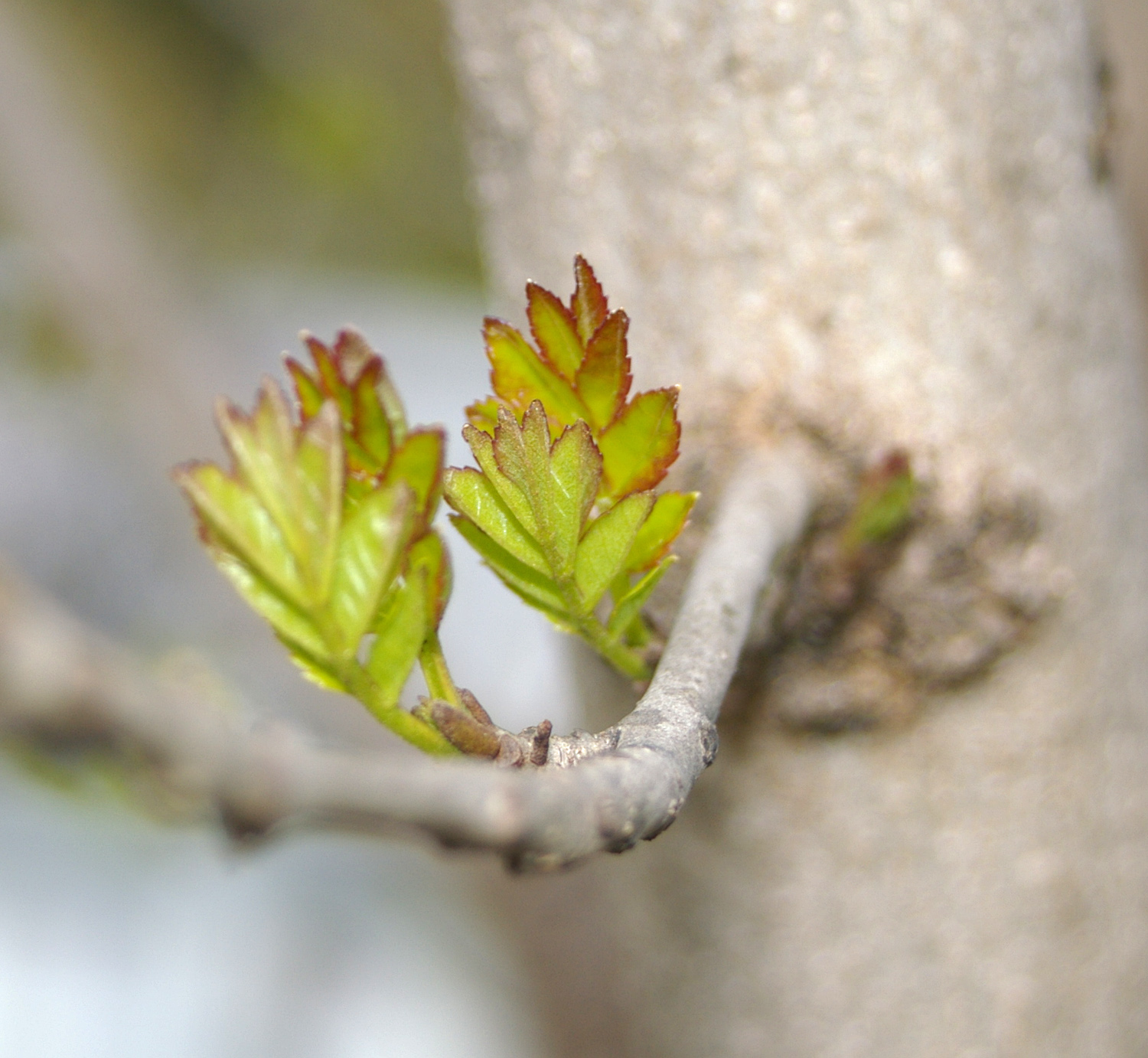
New leaves of subsp. angustifolia

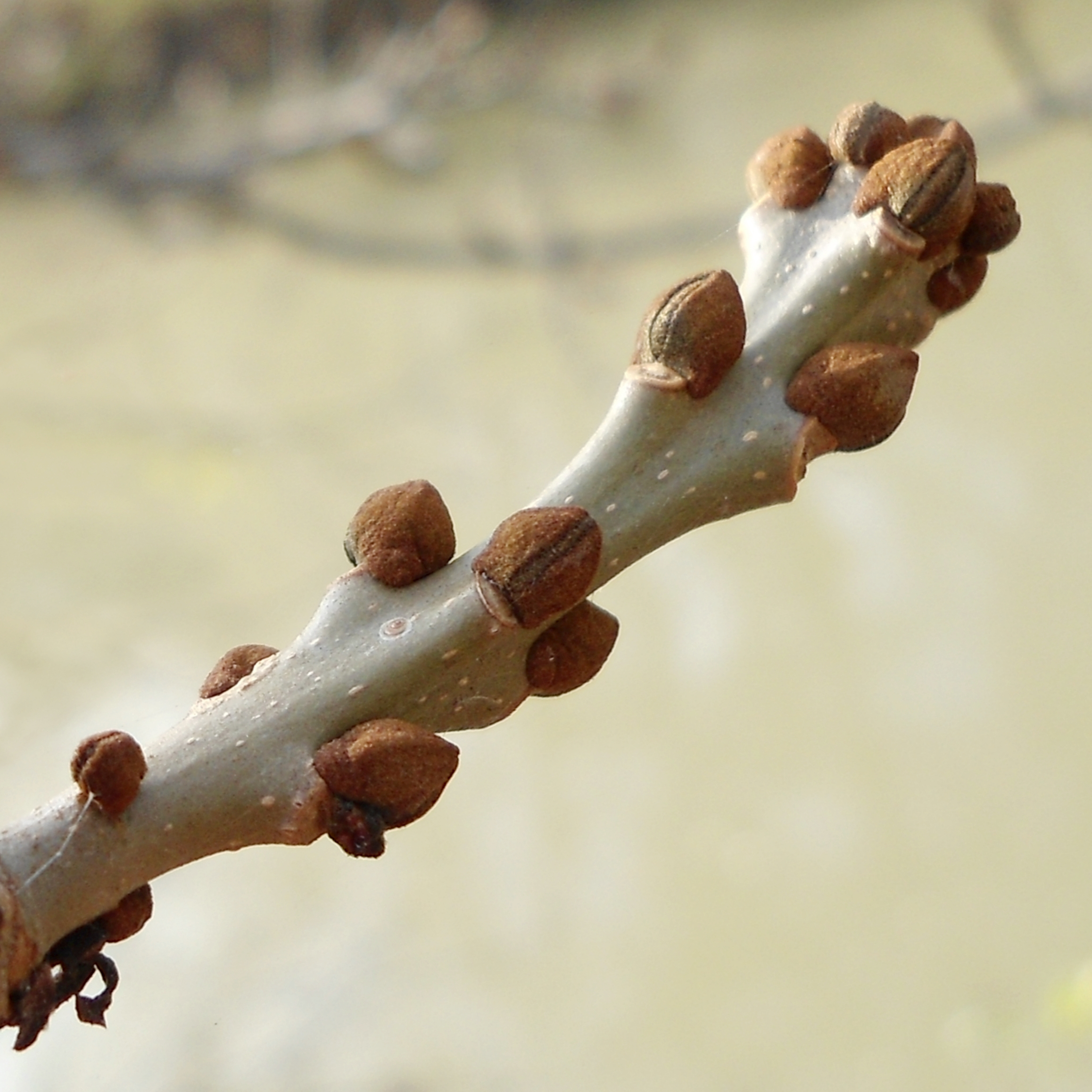
Characteristic brown buds
