= Acer platanoides 'Pendulum' =

Species of maple

- Genus: Acer
- Species: Acer platanoides
- Cultivar: 'Pendulum'
- Origin: Romania

Acer platanoides 'Pendulum', or weeping Norway maple, is a weeping tree and a cultivar of Acer platanoides, the Norway maple. It was first found by Niemetz at Timișoara, Romania in 1901. No trees are known to survive of this cultivar.

== Description ==
A weeping tree without a leader and with perpendicular branches forming an umbrella shape.

== Accessions ==
This cultivar does not seem to have been cultivated outside Romania. It was cultivated at the Bazos Arboretum where the last known specimen died in the year 2000.

== Synonymy ==
- Acer platanoides var. pendulum Niemetz (1901)
