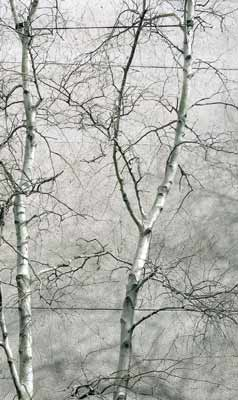
- Gray birches in winter

Conservation status
- Least Concern (IUCN 3.1)

- Secure (NatureServe)

Scientific classification
- Kingdom: Plantae
- Clade: Tracheophytes
- Clade: Angiosperms
- Clade: Eudicots
- Clade: Rosids
- Order: Fagales
- Family: Betulaceae
- Genus: Betula
- Subgenus: Betula subg. Betula
- Species: B. populifolia

Binomial name
- Betula populifolia Marshall
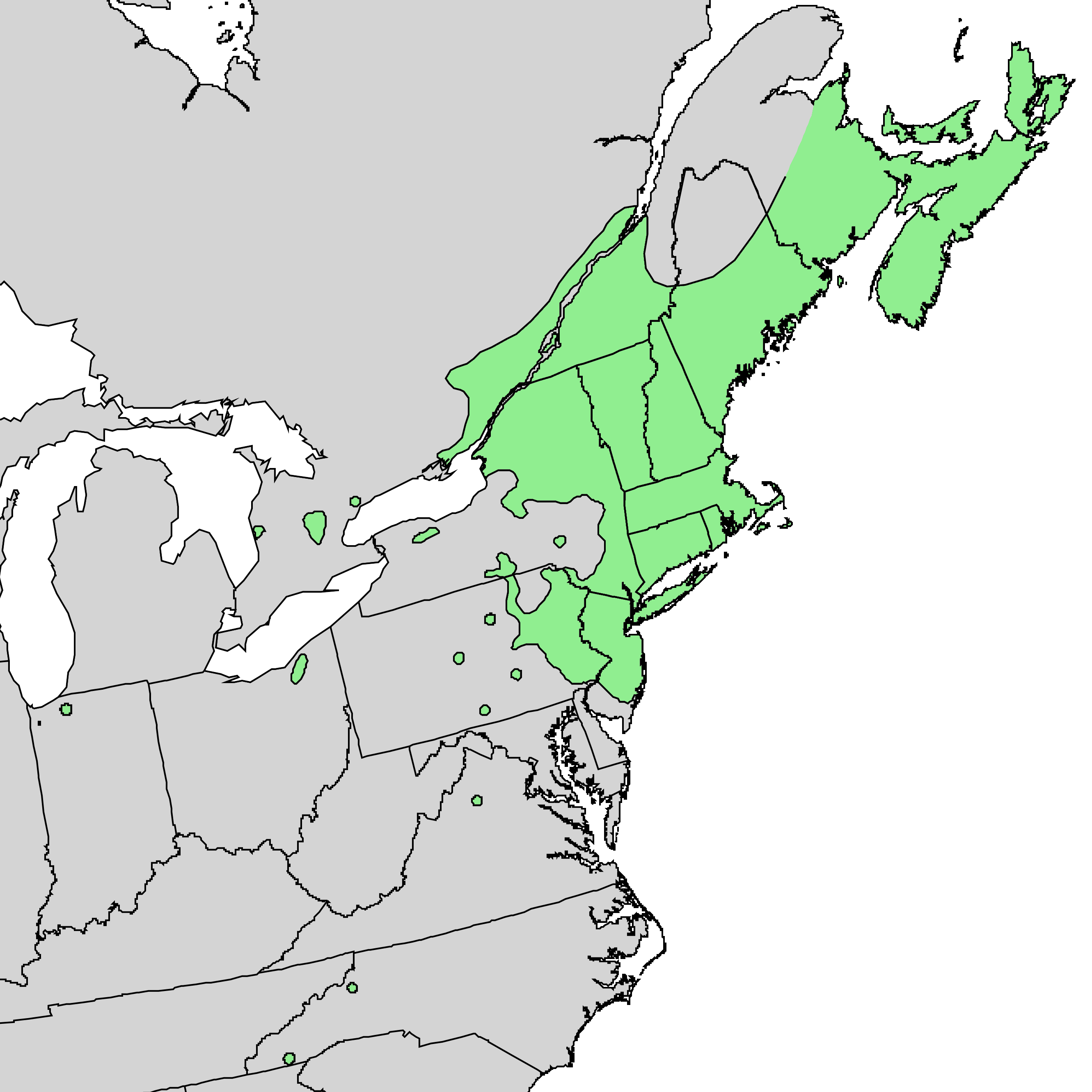
- Natural range of Betula populifolia

= Betula populifolia =

Gray birch

Species of birch

Betula populifolia, known as the gray or grey birch, is a deciduous tree in the family Betulaceae. It is native to eastern North America and is most commonly found in the northeast United States as well as southern Quebec, New Brunswick, and Nova Scotia. The tree is a pioneer species that is commonly found in sites following disturbance, such as fire or logging. Gray birches don't have as much economic value as other birch species but are still commonly used as ornamental trees.

== Description ==
Betula populifolia is a small tree that reaches heights of 20 to 30 feet (6 to 9 m) with a diameter at breast height (DBH) of 4 to 8 inches (10 to 20 cm). The tree is often found with multiple stems. The crown is pyramidal with somewhat drooping branches.

The bark is smooth, a grayish-white or chalky color with visible lenticels and black triangular patches located at the base of branches. It is commonly confused for paper birch (Betula papyrifera) by means of its bark, but it is differentiable as gray birch bark does not exfoliate (peel) as readily as paper birch. It is also occasionally confused for quaking aspen (Populus tremuloides), which has similar bark, but different leaves and buds.

Twigs are slender, wiry, hairless, dull gray or brown in color, and have a warty or rough texture. Buds are pointed, green-brown in color, shiny, and have a gummy coating. Betula populifolia lacks terminal buds.

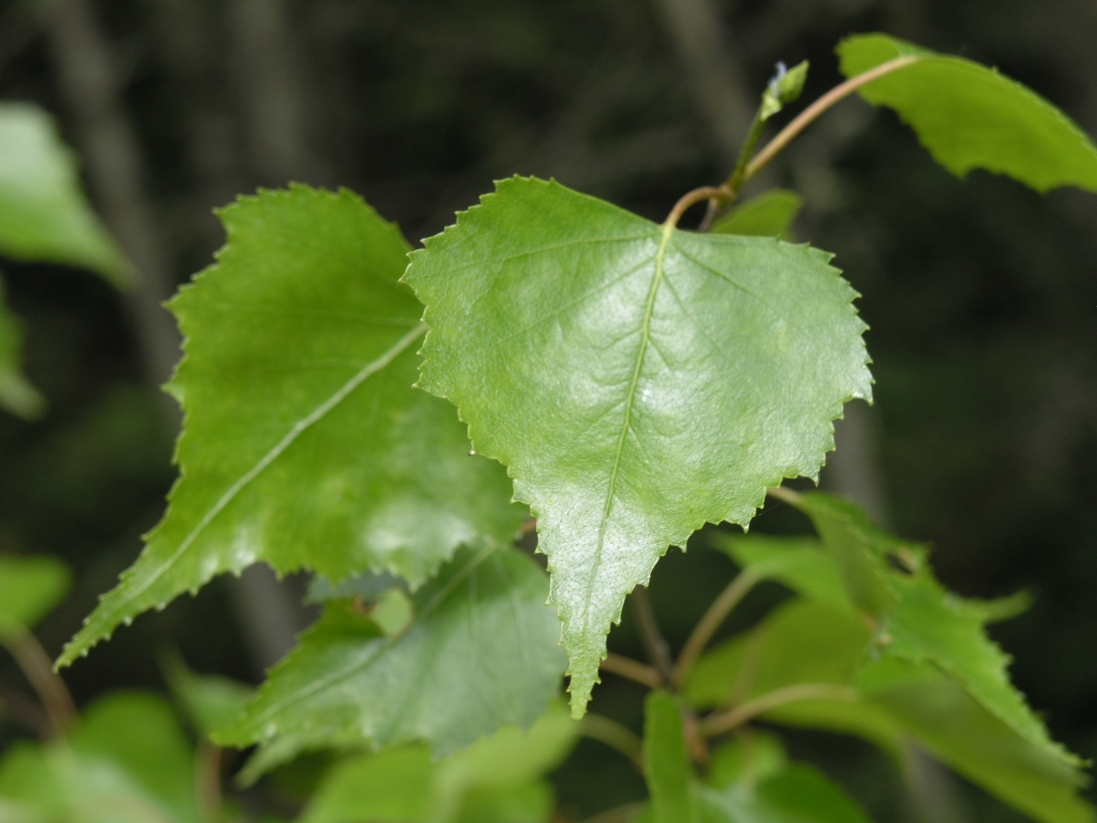
The triangular leaves of Betula populifolia. New Brunswick, Canada.

The leaves are 2.5 to 3 inches (5 to 7 cm) in length, alternate, simple, pinnately-veined, and taper to an elongated tip. They are dark green and glabrous above and paler below, with doubly serrate margins. Like other members of the Betula genus, leaves turn yellow in autumn.

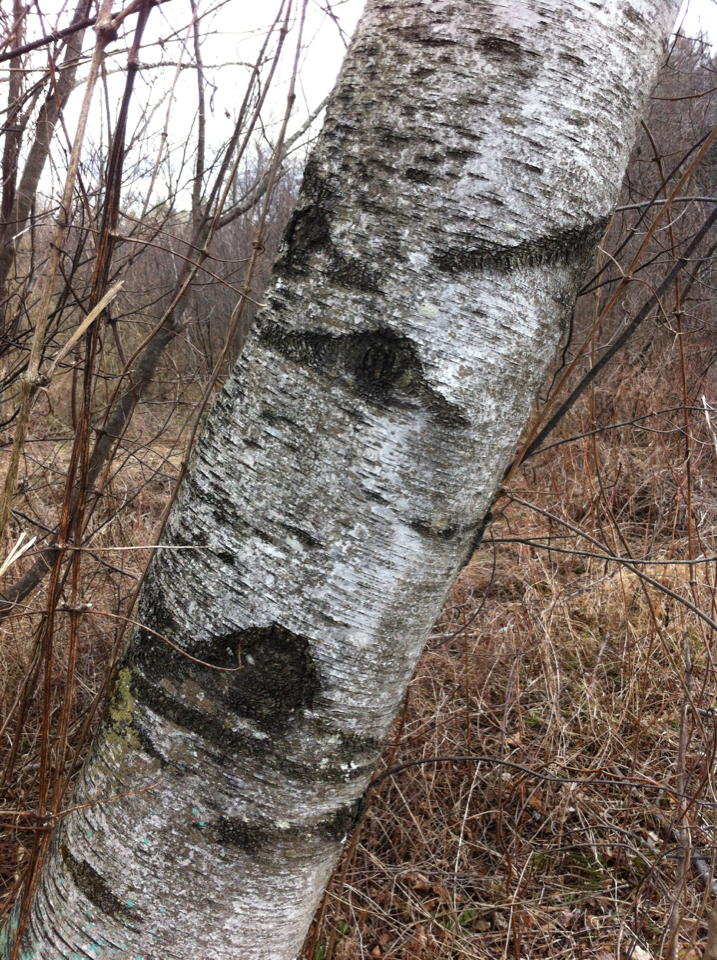
Betula populifolia bark, with its signature black chevron patches.

The flowers are wind-pollinated catkins 2 to 3 inches (5 to 8 cm) long, the male catkins pendulous and the female catkins erect. The fruit, maturing in autumn, is composed of many tiny winged seeds packed between the catkin bracts.

=== Etymology ===
Betula populifolia means "birch with poplar-like leaves" when translated from Latin to English, and is derived from the behavior of gray birch leaves, which flutter similarly to poplar leaves in the wind.

== Distribution and habitat ==
Gray birch can be found in the northeast United States and small portions of Canada. It ranges from southeastern Quebec along the St. Lawrence River east to parts of New Brunswick and Nova Scotia, south through New England and upstate New York to Pennsylvania and New Jersey. There are also disjunct populations in Ohio, western Pennsylvania, Virginia, and North Carolina. Gray birch has been listed as extinct in Delaware, extirpated in Illinois, and rare in Maryland.

The tree prefers well-drained, loamy soils, but can also grow in dryer, gravelly soils. They are tolerant of poor soils with low nutrient densities, which allows them to establish in a wide variety of habitats. They are known as pioneer species since they are often one of the first trees to populate a disturbed area, such as fields, burn sites, and abandoned mines. They thrive in sunlight since they are a shade intolerant species, but eventually give way to longer lived, more shade tolerant species. In regenerative stands, Betula populifolia are commonly found along other early successional species such as paper birch, quaking aspen, and bigtooth aspen (Populus grandidentata). In other mixed stands, gray birches are commonly associated with beech-birch-maple communities.

=== Ecology ===
Gray birches play a role in the habitat of many different species of wildlife. A number of songbirds such as blue jays (Cyanocitta cristata), chickadees (Poecile atricapillus), juncos (Junco hyemalis), and many others consume gray birch seeds. Moose (Alces alces), white-tailed deer (Odocoileus virginianus), and snowshoe hare (Lepus americanus) use the twigs as browse, and although it's not their preferred feed, beavers (Castor canadensis) will chew the bark.

Like other North American birches, gray birch is highly resistant to the bronze birch borer (Agrilus anxius). This is due to birches in North America sharing a coevolutionary relationship with the borer, allowing it to develop resistance to the bug. Despite this, the borers can still damage the trees if they are weakened by other means. Between about 1930 and 1950, many gray birch trees, along with paper birch and yellow birch (Betula alleghaniensis), were weakened by birch dieback disease, which allowed for the bronze birch borer to attack and kill the trees.

== Uses ==
=== Wood Products ===
Gray birch wood is soft and easily turned, so it is often made into spools, clothespins, and other turned woodenware. It is most commonly used as firewood. The wood is less sought after than paper birch due to its short lifespan, smaller size, and less common distribution. It also has tendencies to quickly deteriorate when exposed to excess moisture, meaning it has little commercial value beyond turned items and fuel.

=== Landscape Use ===
Gray birches are a commonly used landscape/ornamental tree. It is widely used due to its soil tolerance levels, resistance to bark borers, smaller stature, as well as the bark coloration. Whitespire is a common ornamental cultivar and has whiter bark than the natural form of the tree. Gray birch also can serve as a nurse tree for smaller, more economically valuable pines that require some form of protection to become established.

=== Medicinal Use ===
Prior to the European colonists' arrival to North America, the indigenous Iroquois and Mi'kmaq peoples used the inner bark of gray birch trees to treat infected cuts and wounds.
