= Acer negundo 'Pendulum' =

Weeping tree

- Genus: Acer
- Species: Acer negundo
- Cultivar: 'Pendulum'
- Origin: Germany

Acer negundo 'Pendulum', or weeping boxelder maple, is a weeping tree and a cultivar of Acer negundo, the boxelder maple. It was first described by Fritz Kurt Alexander von Schwerin in 1896. No trees are known to survive of this cultivar.

== Description ==
A weeping tree without a true leader and with perpendicular branches forming an umbrella shape. When top grafted it looks similar to Fraxinus excelsior 'Pendula'.

== Accessions ==
This cultivar does not seem to have been cultivated outside Germany. No trees are known to survive.

== Synonymy ==
- Acer negundo pendulum Schwer.(1896)
