= Fraxinus angustifolia 'Pendula Vera' =

Weeping tree cultivar

- Genus: Fraxinus
- Species: Fraxinus angustifolia
- Cultivar: 'Pendula Vera'
- Origin: Germany

Fraxinus angustifolia 'Pendula Vera', or true weeping narrow-leafed ash, is a weeping tree and a cultivar of Fraxinus angustifolia subsp. angustifolia, the Narrow-leafed Ash. It was first mentioned by Beissner, Schelle & Zabel in 1903. No trees are known to survive of this cultivar.

== Description ==
A strongly weeping tree with a leader and with perpendicular branches forming a dome shape. More pendulous then the well known 'Pendula'

== Accessions ==
This cultivar used to be cultivated in Germany. No specimens are known to survive.

== Synonymy ==
- Fraxinus lentiscifolia f. pendula-vera Beissner, Schelle & Zabel (1901), nom. nud. [as f. pendula vera]
