= Acer campestre 'Eastleigh Weeping' =

Maple cultivar

Acer campestre
- Cultivar: 'Eastleigh Weeping'
- Origin: England

The Field Maple Acer campestre cultivar 'Eastleigh Weeping' or 'Weeping Eastleigh Field Maple' is a weeping tree that originated as a seedling at the Hillier & Son nursery, Ampfield, England, and was released in 1980. No trees are known to survive of this cultivar.

== Description ==
The tree is noted for its weak pendulous habit. It is less pendulous than the other Field Maple cultivars 'Pendulum' and 'Green Weeping'.

== Cultivation ==
As with the species, the cultivar thrives best in a semi shade position, on a fertile, well-drained soil. The tree is mentioned in several American websites, suggesting it was introduced to the United States. 'Eastleigh Weeping' no longer remains in commerce in the UK.

== Accessions ==
The tree growing at the Sir Harold Hillier Gardens died; no other accessions are known.
