= Acer campestre 'Puncticulatum' =

Maple cultivar

- Genus: Acer
- Species: Acer campestre
- Cultivar: 'Puncticulatum'
- Origin: Germany

Acer campestre 'Puncticulatum', or Weeping Speckled Field Maple, is a weeping tree and a cultivar of Acer campestre, the Field Maple. It was first described by Schwerin in 1893. No trees are known to survive of this cultivar.

== Description ==
A weeping tree without a true leader and with pendulous branches forming an umbrella shape similar to A. campestre 'Pendulum' but with leaves speckled and blotched with white like the cultivar 'Pulverulentum'.

== Accessions ==
This cultivar used to be cultivated in Germany and England. The last record, dating from 1925, was from a specimen cultivated at the Royal Botanic Gardens, Kew.

== Synonymy ==
- Acer campestre f. puncticulatum Schwer, (1893)
- Acer campestre var. pendulum-foliis-variegatis G.Nicholson (1902).
- Acer campestre var. pendulum-variegatum G.Nicholson (1925).
- Acer campestre pendulum pulverulentum hort.
