= Birch dieback =

Birch tree disease

Birch dieback is a disease of birch trees that causes the branches in the crown to die off. The disease may eventually kill the tree. In an event in the Eastern United States and Canada in the 1930s and 1940s, no causal agent was found, but the wood-boring beetle, the bronze birch borer, was implicated in the severe damage and death of the tree that often followed. In similar crown dieback occurrences in Europe several decades later, the pathogenic fungus Melanconium betulinum were found in association with affected trees, as well as Anisogramma virgultorum and Marssonina betulae.

== Description ==
Birch dieback tends to attack trees that are under stress, such as from drought, through winter kill or exposure to phenoxy herbicides used to control broad-leafed weeds in cereal crops. First, the foliage becomes scant and develops chlorosis or the leaves at the tips of the shoots start to curl. Then the twigs become bare as new leaves fail to develop. Whole branches may die as well as parts of the crown, and lower parts of the tree may develop densely bunched foliage. The tree usually dies within three to five years of the development of symptoms.

== History ==
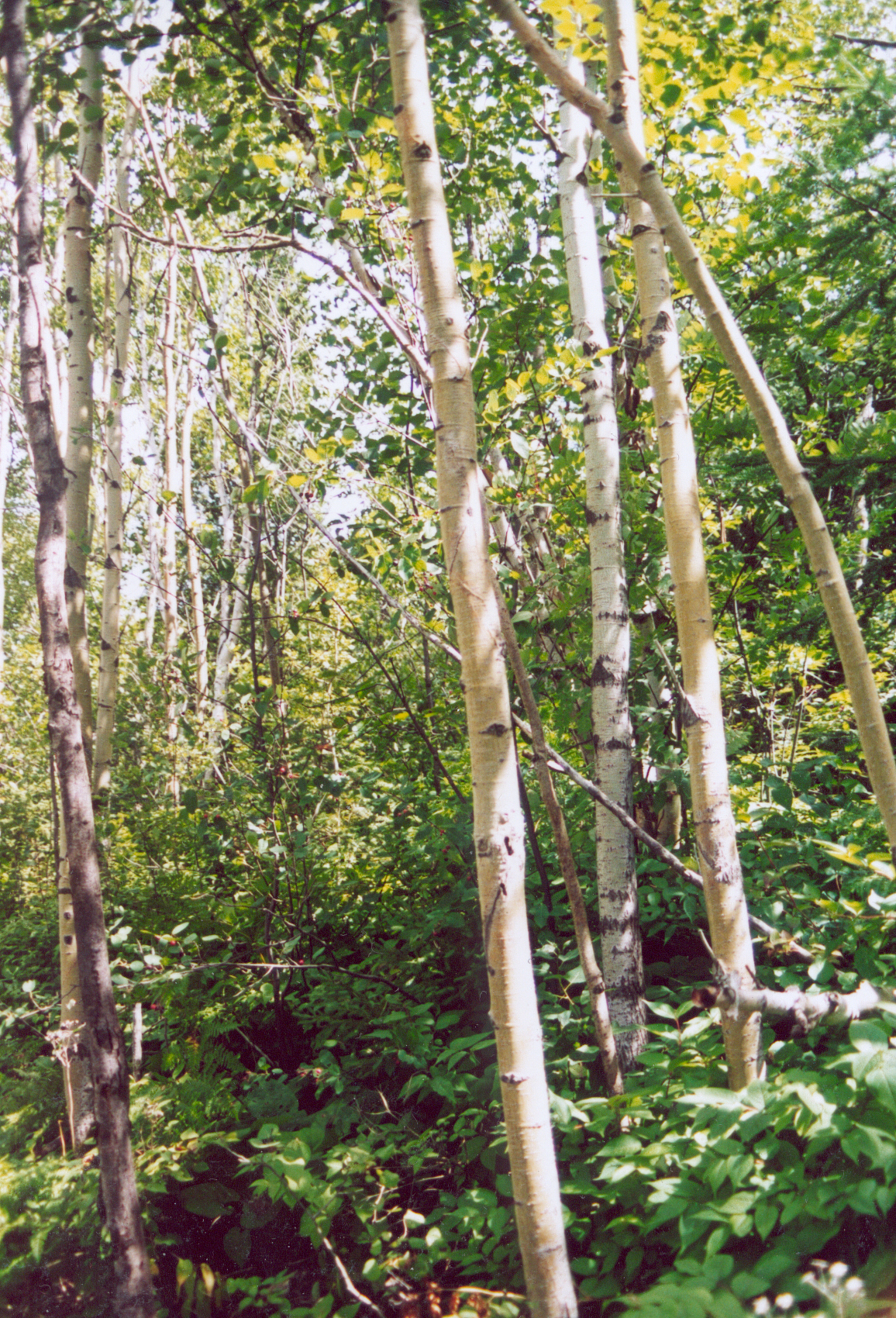
Paper birch in Quebec

A birch dieback event occurred in the eastern United States and Canada between about 1930 and 1950. Species affected included yellow birch (Betula alleghaniensis), paper birch (Betula papyrifera) and gray birch (Betula populifolia) and several features were noted: the dieback was preceded by a reduction in growth rate, there was an east/west gradient, with eastern areas being more severely affected, and the trend was reversed in the 1950s. The bronze birch borer was found to attack and kill trees already weakened by the disease, and honey fungus (Armillaria spp.) invaded the root systems wreaking further damage. The disease was afterwards linked to a rise in temperature of 1 °C (2 °F) that occurred in eastern Canada at that time. This likely caused warmer soils with some tree rootlets dying, and trees under stress from other causes were the most likely to suffer.

At its peak in 1951 in Maine, it was estimated that 67% of the birch trees in the state had been killed. Birch are shallow-rooted trees and other factors involved may have been soil heave and frost damage to rootlets in the absence of a winter snow cover on the ground, the above-ground symptoms of shoot dieback being due to failure of sufficient new rootlets to develop. No specific disease organisms were found. Birch dieback disease is very similar to "postlogging decadence" which primarily affects birches on recently logged sites.

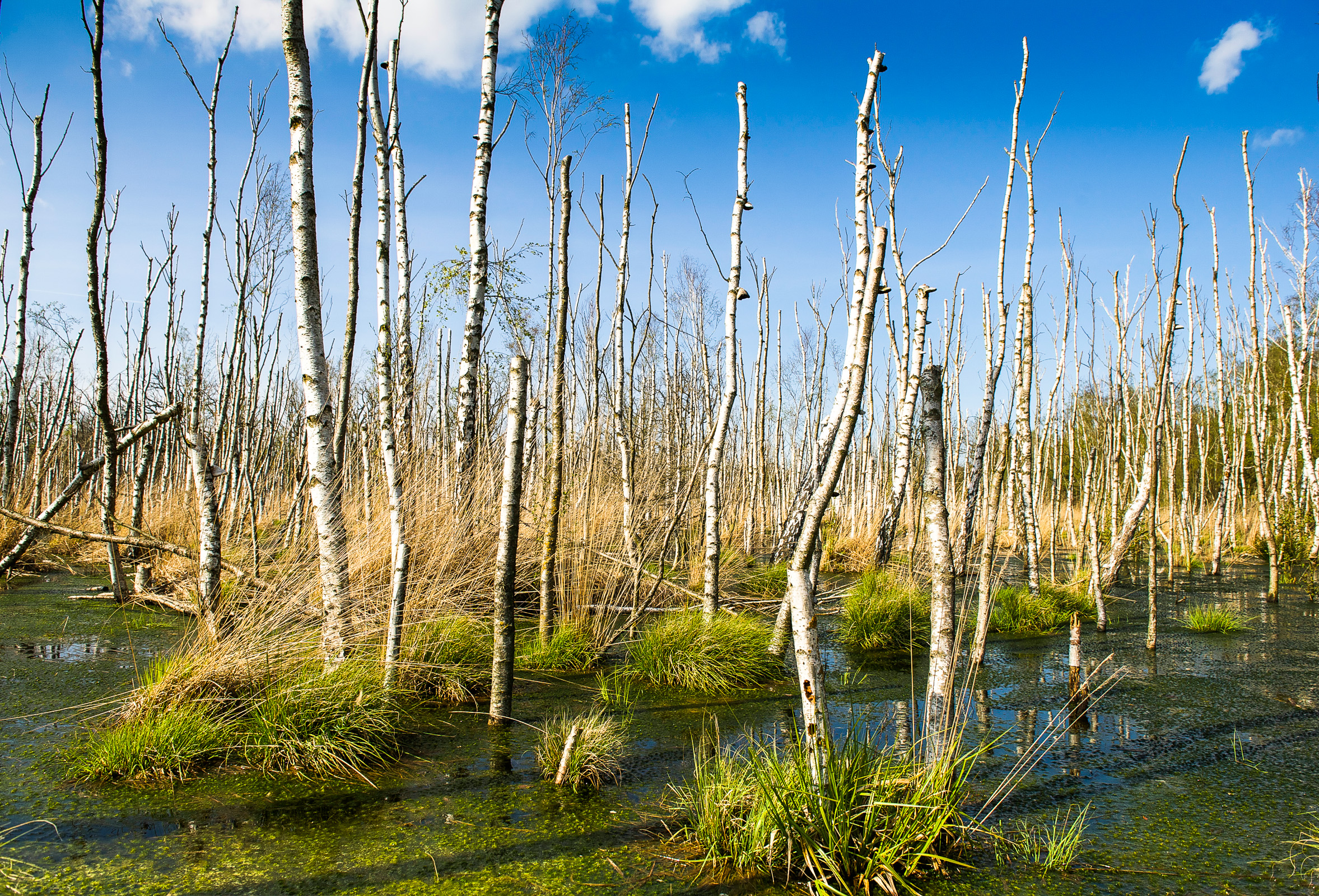
Dead downy birch in Germany

In Scotland in 2004, about 40% of young trees were affected by birch crown dieback. Silver birch (Betula pendula) was more affected than downy birch (Betula pubescens). Two pathogenic species of fungi associated with the dieback were identified, Anisogramma virgultorum and Marssonina betulae. Although both pathogens were present on both species of birch affected with dieback, A. virgultorum did not seem to be implicated in crown dieback on B. pendula.

== Overview ==
Birch dieback is one of a number of emerging fungal diseases affecting various species of tree in Western Europe. In 2015, Stephen Cavers of the Centre for Ecology and Hydrology in Scotland, said "There is a clear increase in the number of novel pests and pathogens affecting the trees and forests of Britain. Most likely accelerated by the combined effects of, among other things, globalised trade, a changing climate and the planting of exotic species, the checklist of known threats has recently described an exponential growth pattern." He advocates improving the diversity of the gene pool, planting mixed stands of trees and better controlling the international trade in tree species.
