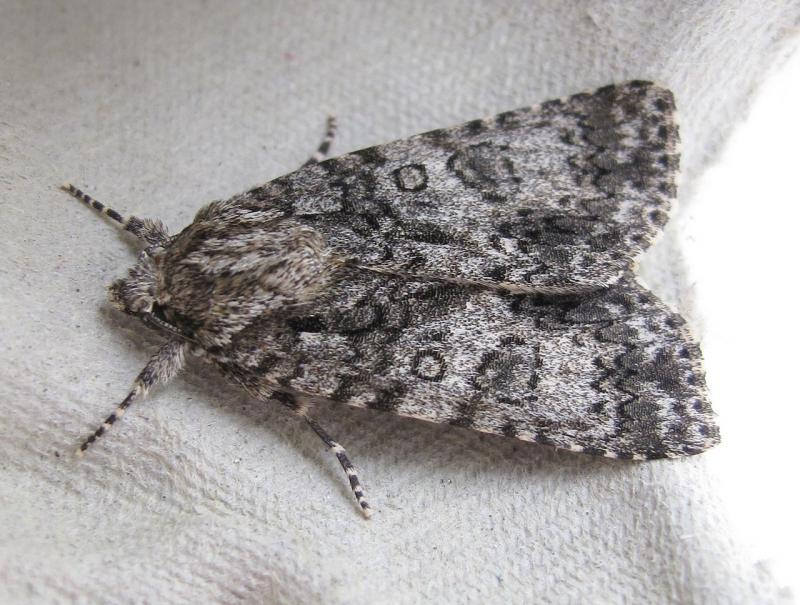

Scientific classification
- Kingdom: Animalia
- Phylum: Arthropoda
- Clade: Pancrustacea
- Class: Insecta
- Order: Lepidoptera
- Superfamily: Noctuoidea
- Family: Noctuidae
- Genus: Acronicta
- Species: A. auricoma

Binomial name
- Acronicta auricoma (Denis & Schiffermüller, 1775)

= Acronicta auricoma =

Species of moth

Acronicta auricoma, the scarce dagger, is a moth of the family Noctuidae. It is distributed through most of the Palearctic.

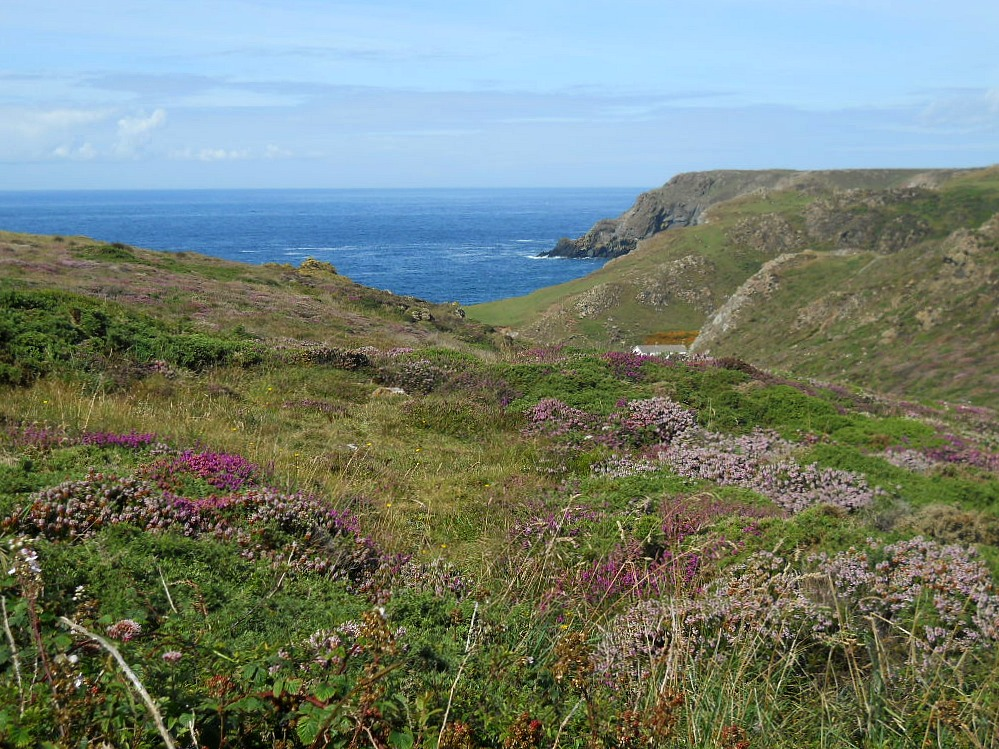
Habitat, England

== Distribution ==
Missing in the Iberian Peninsula. On the Italian Peninsula the occurrence is limited essentially to the Alps and the Apennines as far as Calabria. On the Balkan Peninsula the range is extreme northern Greece with small isolated occurrences in Central Greece. Missing on the most Mediterranean islands with the exception of the Balearic Islands. Extinct in England since 1912. Otherwise all Europe up to north of the Arctic Circle in Scandinavia. In the East, the distribution area stretches over Russia and Siberia to the Russian Far East, in the South to Asia minor, Cyprus, the Caucasus, northern Iran, Northern Iraq and Afghanistan to Central Asia.

The wingspan is 36–42 mm. The forewing is grey, with dark dusting; base of inner margin pale ochreous; a short black basal streak and another above anal angle, often obscure.

The adults fly at night from May to June and from mid-July to August in the British Isles.

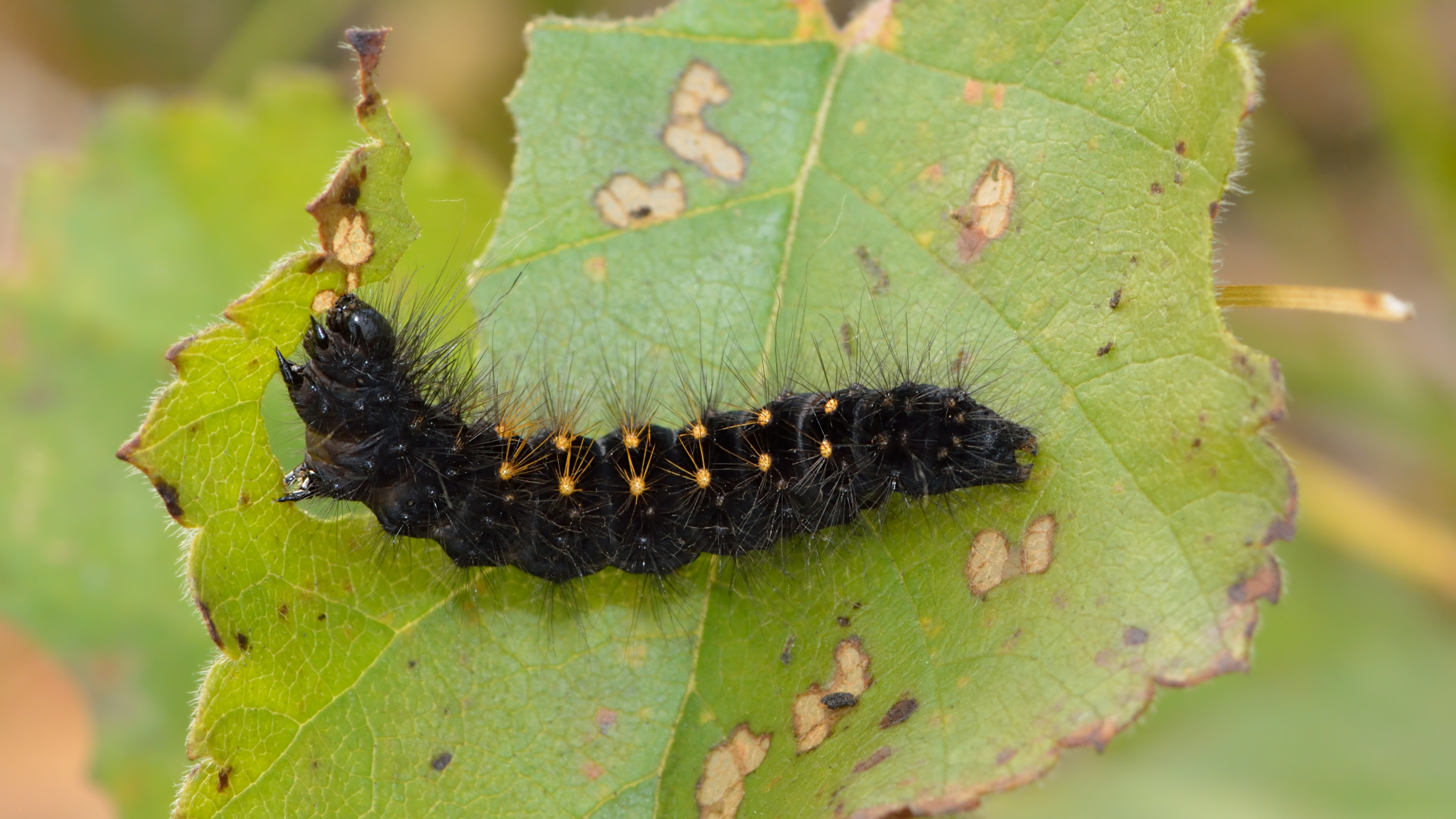
Scarce dagger larva feeding on moor birch

The larvae feed on a number of plants, including oak, Rubus, Calluna and Vaccinium.
