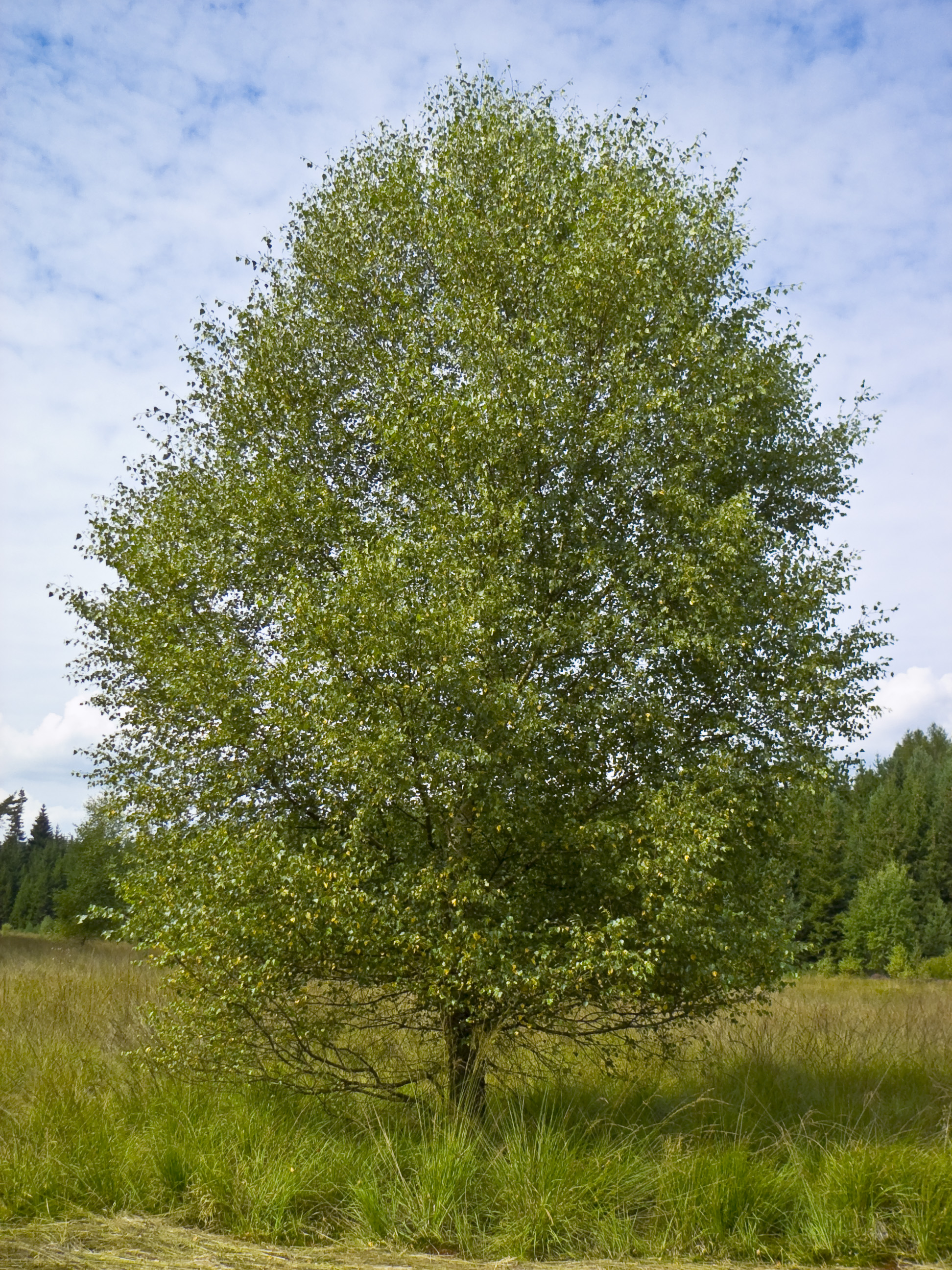

Conservation status
- Least Concern (IUCN 3.1)

Scientific classification
- Kingdom: Plantae
- Clade: Tracheophytes
- Clade: Angiosperms
- Clade: Eudicots
- Clade: Rosids
- Order: Fagales
- Family: Betulaceae
- Genus: Betula
- Subgenus: Betula subg. Betula
- Species: B. pubescens

Binomial name
- Betula pubescens Ehrh.
- Distribution map

Synonyms
- List: Betula acuminata Kindb.; Betula alba L.; Betula alba var. glabrata (Wahlenb.) Muñoz Garm. & Pedrol; Betula alba subsp. glutinosa (Trautv. ex Regel) Holub; Betula ambigua Hampe ex Rchb.; Betula andreji V.N.Vassil.; Betula asplenifolia Regel; Betula × aurata var. rhombifolia (Tausch) Tzvelev; Betula aurea Steud.; Betula baicalia V.N.Vassil.; Betula borealis Spach; Betula borysthenica Klokov; Betula broccembergensis Bechst.; Betula browicziana Güner; Betula callosa Notø; Betula canadensis K.Koch; Betula carpatica Waldst. & Kit. ex Willd.; Betula caucasica Litv. ex Leskov; Betula concinna Gunnarsson; Betula coriifolia Tausch ex Regel; Betula czerepanovii N.I.Orlova; Betula czerepanovii var. nasarovii Tzvelev; Betula dalecarlica L.f.; Betula glabra Dumort.; Betula glauca Wender.; Betula glutinosa Wallr.; Betula golitsinii V.N.Vassil.; Betula hackelii Opiz ex Steud.; Betula jacutica V.N.Vassil.; Betula krylovii G.V.Krylov; Betula × kusmisscheffii (Regel) Sukaczev; Betula laciniata Thunb.; Betula lenta Du Roi; Betula litwinowii Doluch.; Betula macrostachya Schrad. ex Regel; Betula major Gilib.; Betula megaloptera Kindb.; Betula microdontia Kindb.; Betula murithii Gaudin ex Regel; Betula nigricans Wender.; Betula odorata Bechst.; Betula odorata var. tortuosa (Ledeb.) Rosenv.; Betula ovata K.Koch; Betula platyodontia Kindb.; Betula pontica Loudon; Betula pubescens var. appressa Kallio & Y.Mäkinen; Betula pubescens subsp. borealis (Spach) Á.Löve & D.Löve; Betula pubescens f. columnaris T.Ulvinen; Betula pubescens subsp. czerepanovii (N.I.Orlova) Hämet-Ahti; Betula pubescens f. hibernifolia T.Ulvinen; Betula pubescens f. rubra T.Ulvinen; Betula recurvata (I.V.Vassil.) V.N.Vassil.; Betula rhombifolia Tausch; Betula rotundata Beck; Betula sajanensis V.N.Vassil.; Betula sokolowii Regel; Betula stenocarpa Kindb.; Betula subarctica Orlova; Betula subarctica var. pojarkovae Tzvelev; Betula subodorata Kindb.; Betula tomentosa Reitter & Abeleven; Betula torfacea (Custor) Schleich.; Betula tortuosa Ledeb.; Betula transcaucasica V.N.Vassil.; Betula tricholepidea Kindb.; Betula urticifolia (Loudon) Regel; Betula virgata Salisb.

= Betula pubescens =

Species of birch

Betula pubescens (syn. Betula alba), commonly known as downy birch and also as moor birch, white birch, European white birch or hairy birch, is a species of deciduous tree, native and abundant throughout northern Europe and northern Asia, growing further north than any other broadleaf tree. It is closely related to, and often confused with, the silver birch (B. pendula), but grows in wetter places with heavier soils and poorer drainage; smaller trees can also be confused with the dwarf birch (B. nana).

Six varieties are recognised and it hybridises with the silver and dwarf birches. A number of cultivars have been developed, but many are no longer in cultivation. The larva of the autumnal moth (Epirrita autumnata) feeds on the foliage and in some years, large areas of birch forest can be defoliated by this insect. Many fungi are associated with the tree and certain pathogenic fungi are the causal agents of birch dieback disease.

The tree is a pioneer species, readily colonising cleared land, but later being replaced by taller, more long-lived species. The bark can be stripped off without killing the tree. The bark and the timber is used for turnery and in the manufacture of plywood, furniture, shelves, coffins, matches, toys and wood flooring. The inner bark is edible and it was ground up and used in bread-making in times of famine. The rising sap in spring can be used to make refreshing drinks, wines, ales and liqueurs and various parts of the tree have been used in herbal medicine.

== Description ==
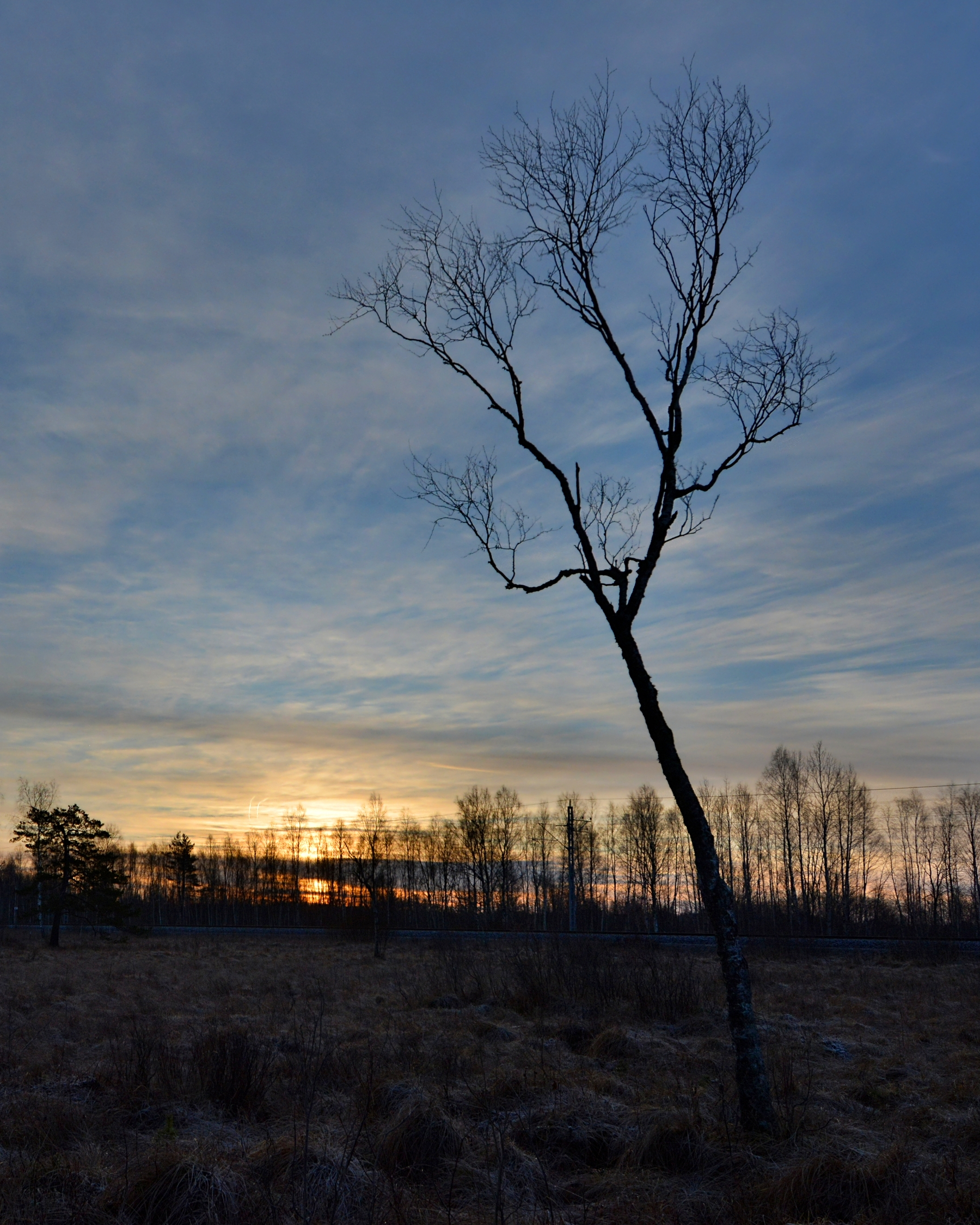
The branches are upward or horizontally spread, but never pendulous (as with silver birch)

Betula pubescens is known as downy birch, with other common names including moor birch, white birch, European white birch or hairy birch. It is a deciduous tree growing to 10 to 20 m (33 to 66 ft) tall (rarely to 27 m), with a slender crown and a trunk up to 70 cm (28 in) (exceptionally 1 m) in diameter, with smooth but dull grey-white bark finely marked with dark horizontal lenticels. The shoots are grey-brown with fine downy. The leaves are ovate-acute, 2 to 5 cm (0.8 to 2.0 in) long and 1.5 to 4.5 cm (0.6 to 1.8 in) broad, with a finely serrated margin. The flowers are wind-pollinated catkins, produced in early spring before the leaves. The fruit is a pendulous, cylindrical aggregate 1 to 4 cm (0.4 to 1.6 in) long and 5 to 7 mm (0.2 to 0.3 in) wide which disintegrates at maturity, releasing the individual seeds; these seeds are 2 mm (0.08 in) long with two small wings along the side.

=== Species identification ===
B. pubescens is closely related to, and often confused with, the silver birch (B. pendula). Many North American texts treat the two species as conspecific (and cause confusion by combining the downy birch's alternative vernacular name, white birch, with the scientific name B. pendula of the other species), but they are regarded as distinct species throughout Europe.

Downy birch can be distinguished from silver birch with its smooth, downy shoots, which are hairless and warty in silver birch. The bark of the downy birch is a dull greyish white, whereas the silver birch has striking white, papery bark with black fissures. The leaf margins also differ, finely serrated in downy birch, coarsely double-toothed in silver birch. The two have differences in habitat requirements, with downy birch more common on wet, poorly drained sites, such as clays and peat bogs, and silver birch found mainly on dry, sandy soils.

In more northerly locations, downy birch can also be confused with the dwarf birch (Betula nana), both species being morphologically variable. All three species can be distinguished cytologically, silver birch and dwarf birch being diploid (with two sets of chromosomes), whereas downy birch is tetraploid (with four sets of chromosomes). In Iceland, dwarf birch and downy birch sometimes hybridise, the resulting plants being triploid (with three sets of chromosomes).

=== Distribution and habitat ===
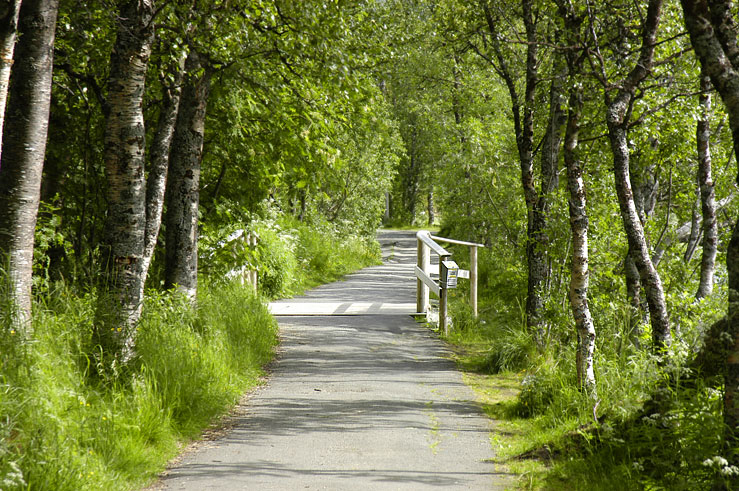
Betula pubescens near a path encircling a lake inside the Arctic Circle in Tromsø

Betula pubescens has a wide distribution in northern and central Europe and Asia. Its range extends from Newfoundland, Iceland, the British Isles and Spain eastwards across northern and central Europe and Asia as far as the Lake Baikal region in Siberia. The range extends southwards to about 40°N, its southernmost limit being Turkey, the Caucasus and the Altai Mountains. It is a pioneer species which establishes itself readily in new areas away from the parent tree. This allows other woodland trees to become established and the birch, a short-lived tree, eventually gets crowded out as its seedlings are intolerant of shady conditions.

Downy birch extends further north into the Arctic than any other broadleaf tree. Specimens of the subarctic populations are usually small and very contorted, and are often distinguished as arctic downy birch or mountain birch, B. p. var. pumila. (not to be confused with B. nana). This variety is notable as being one of very few trees native to Iceland and Greenland, and is the only native tree to form woodland in Iceland. At one time the island is thought to have been covered in downy birch woodland, but that cover is reduced to about one percent of the land surface today.

== Varieties and cultivars ==
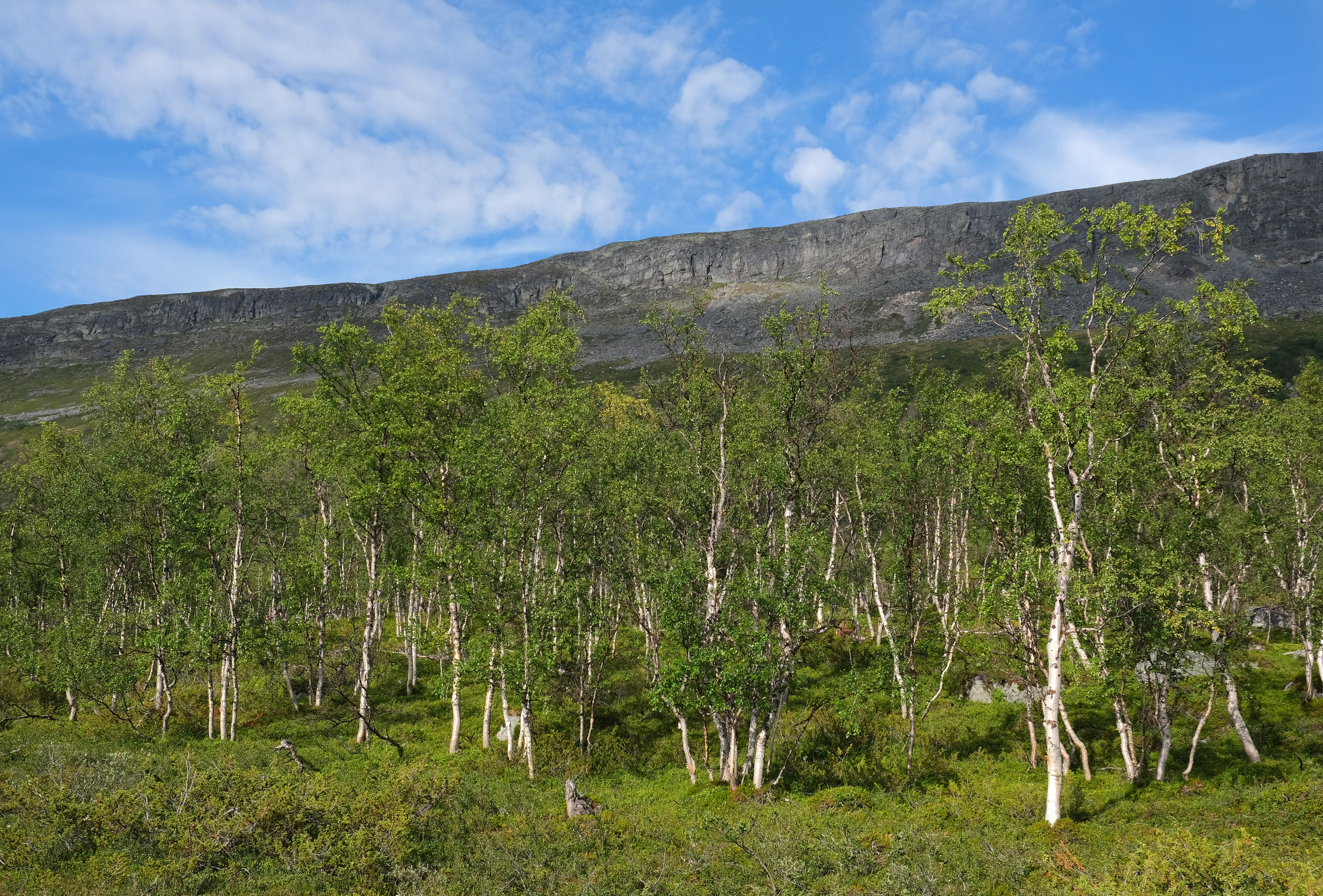
Arctic downy birch forms the tree line in most of Fennoscandia

Three varieties are recognised, the nominate Betula pubescens var. pubescens, B. p. var. litwinowii (distributed in the Caucasus and Turkey) and B. p. var. pumila (arctic downy birch or mountain birch, formerly called B. p. subsp. tortuosa). The latter has arisen from the hybridization of var. pubescens and B. nana (dwarf birch) and is characterised by its shrubby habit, smaller leaves, resinous glands and the smaller wings on the fruit. A number of cultivars have been grown, but many are no longer in cultivation. They include "Armenian gold", "Arnold Brembo" (scented foliage), crenata nana (shrubby and dwarf), incisa (lobed foliage), integrifolia (unlobed foliage), murigthii (shrubby with doubly serrate leaves), ponitica (hairless), undulata (leaf margins waxy), urticifolia (nettle-leaved), variegata (variegated) and "Yellow wings". Two others, described by the German botanist Ernst Schelle in 1903, are also lost; pendula, a cultivar with a leader and weeping branches, and pendula nana, which grows into an umbrella-shaped tree with weeping branches, but no leader. Betula pubescens 'Rubra' has maroon foliage.

== Ecology ==
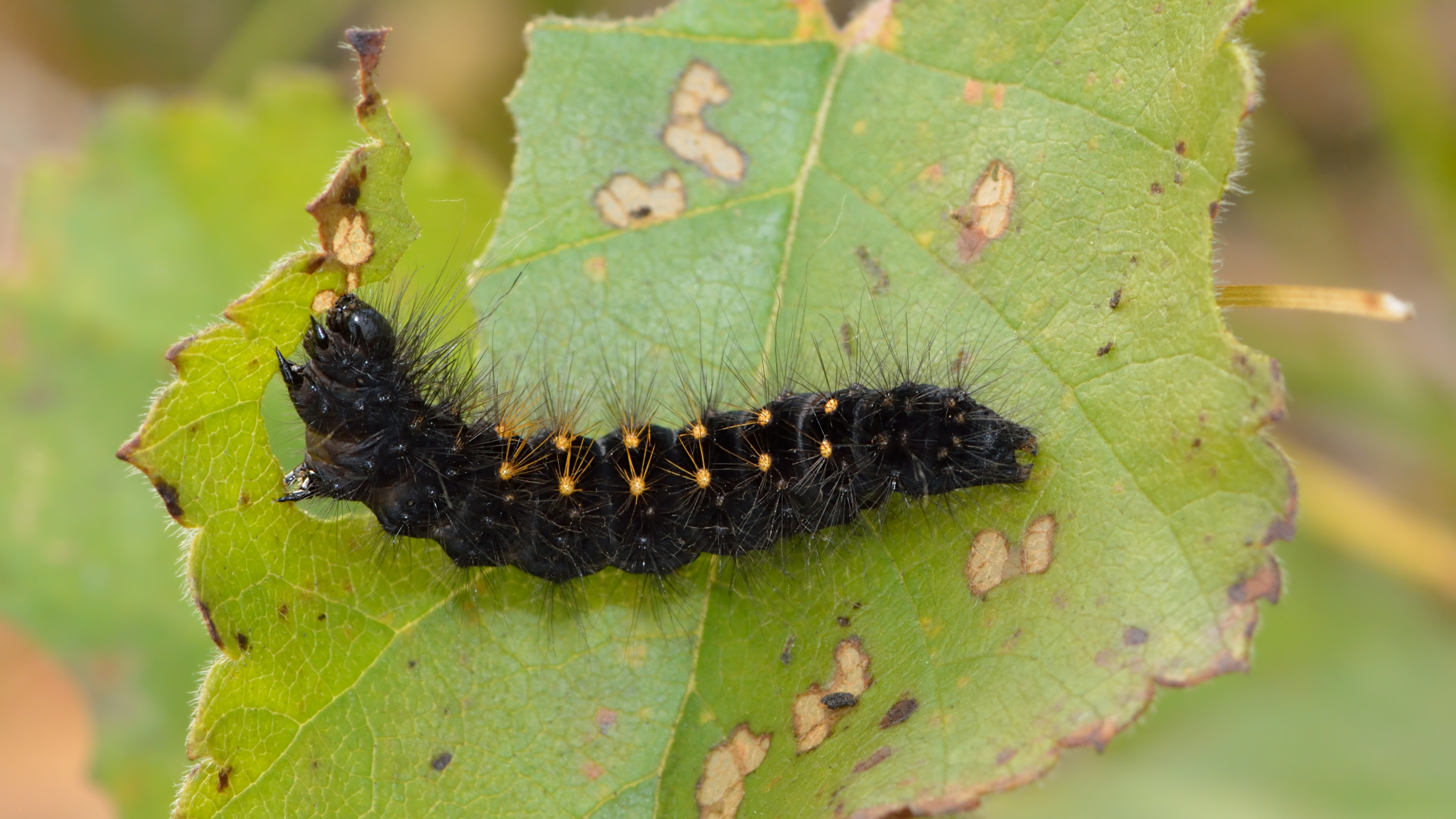
Scarce dagger larva feeding on the moor birch

The larva of the autumnal moth (Epirrita autumnata) feeds on the foliage of Betula pubescens and other tree species. In outbreak years, large areas of birch forest can be defoliated by this insect. Damage to the leaf tissue stimulates the tree to produce chemicals that reduce foliage quality, stunting the growth of the larvae and reducing their pupal weights.

In Greenland, about seventy species of fungi have been found growing in association with B. pubescens, as parasites or saprobes on living or dead wood. Some of the most common fungi include Ceriporia reticulata, Chondrostereum purpureum, Exidia repanda, Hyphoderma spp, Inonotus obliquus, Inonotus radiatus, Mycena galericulata, Mycena rubromarginata, Panellus ringens, Peniophora incarnata, Phellinus lundellii, Radulomyces confluens, Stereum rugosum, Trechispora spp., Tubulicrinis spp. and Tyromyces chioneus.

Birch dieback disease, associated with the fungal pathogens Marssonina betulae and Anisogramma virgultorum, can affect planted trees, while naturally regenerated trees seem less susceptible. This disease also affects Betula pendula and in 2000 was reported at many of the sites planted with birch in Scotland during the 1990s.

== Uses ==
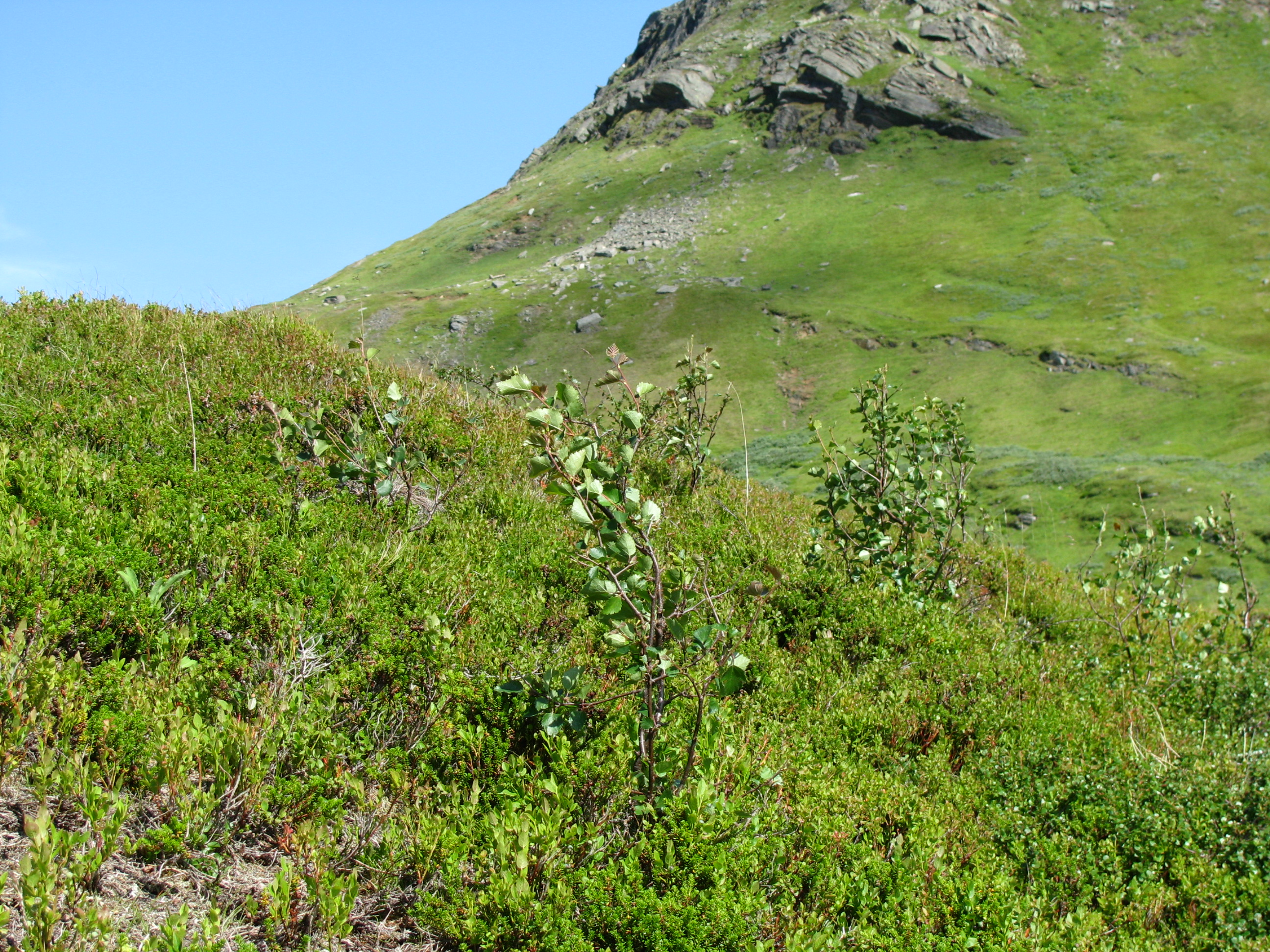
Betula pubescens is a pioneering species, seen expanding its altitudinal range here in Norway

The outer layer of bark can be stripped off the tree without killing it and can be used to make canoe skins, drinking vessels and roofing tiles. The inner bark can be used for the production of rope and for making a form of oiled paper. This bark is also rich in tannin and has been used as a brown dye and as a preservative. The bark can also be turned into a high quality charcoal favoured by artists. The twigs and young branches are very flexible and make good whisks and brooms. The timber is pale in colour with a fine, uniform texture and is used in the manufacture of plywood, furniture, shelves, coffins, matches and toys, and in turnery.

The Sami people of Scandinavia used the bark of both B. pubescens and B. pendula as an ingredient in bread-making; the reddish phloem, just below the outer bark, was dried, ground up and blended with wheat flour to make a traditional loaf. In Finland, mämmi, a traditional Easter food, was packed and baked in boxes of birch bark. Nowadays, cardboard boxes are used, but imprinted with the typical bark pattern. Birch bark was used as an emergency food in times of famine; in Novgorod in 1127–28, desperate people ate it along with such things as the leaves of lime trees, wood pulp, straw, husks and moss. In Iceland, trimmings of birch trees are used with birch sap in the making of a sweet birch liqueur. The removal of bark was at one time so widespread that Carl Linnaeus expressed his concern for the survival of the woodlands. The leaves can be infused with boiling water to make a tea, and extracts of the plant have been used as herbal remedies.

Both B. pubescens and B. pendula can be tapped in spring to obtain a sugary fluid. This can be consumed fresh, concentrated into a syrup similar to the better-known maple syrup, or can be fermented into an ale or wine. In Scandinavia and Finland, this is done on a domestic scale, but in the former USSR, particularly Russia, Ukraine, Belarus, Estonia, Latvia and Lithuania, birch sap is harvested commercially and used to manufacture cosmetics, medicines and foodstuffs.
