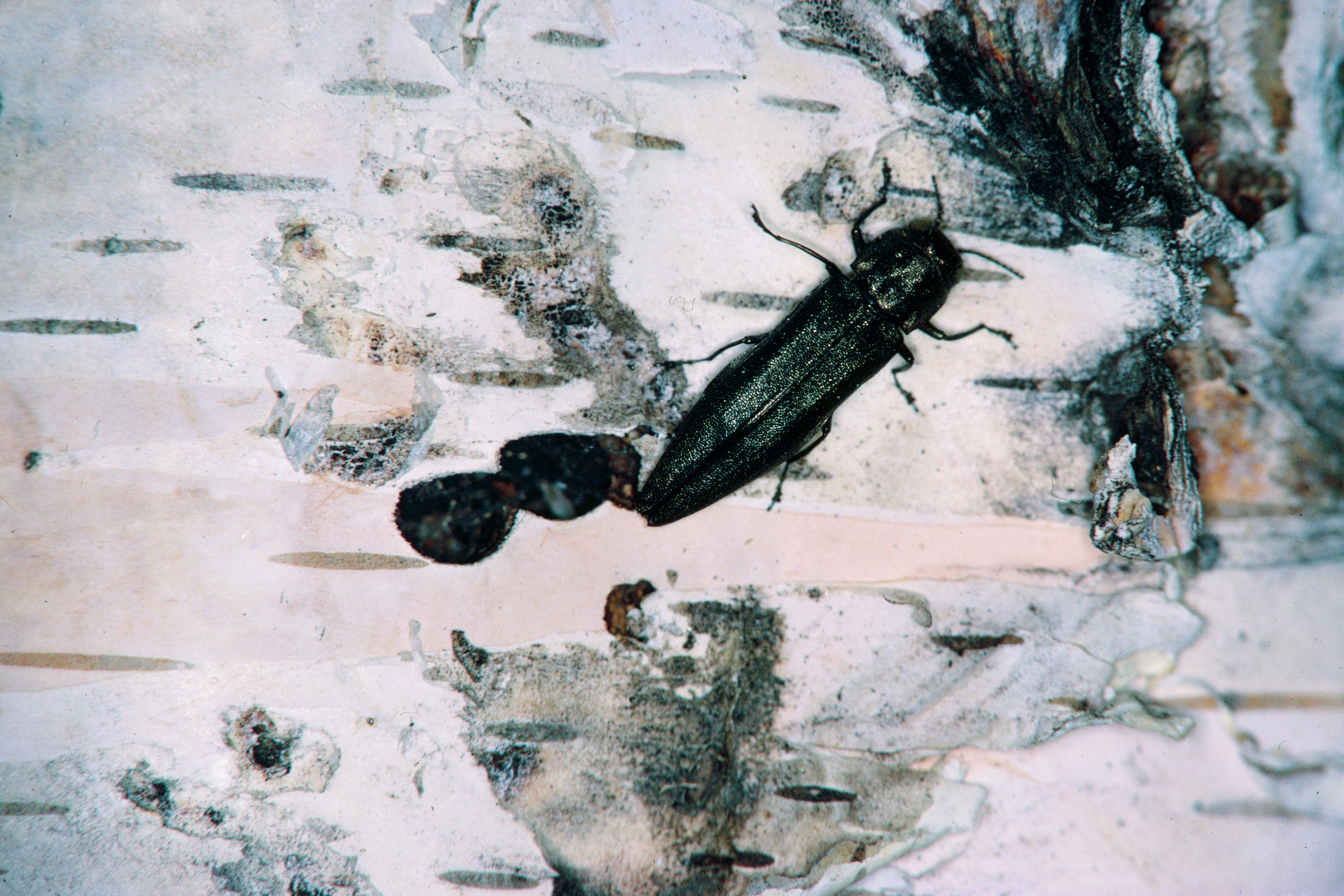

Scientific classification
- Domain: Eukaryota
- Kingdom: Animalia
- Phylum: Arthropoda
- Class: Insecta
- Order: Coleoptera
- Suborder: Polyphaga
- Infraorder: Elateriformia
- Family: Buprestidae
- Genus: Agrilus
- Species: A. anxius

Binomial name
- Agrilus anxius Gory, 1841

= Agrilus anxius =

Bronze birch borer

Species of beetle

Agrilus anxius, the bronze birch borer, is a wood-boring buprestid beetle native to North America, more numerous in the warmer parts of the continent and rare in the north. It is a serious pest on birch trees (Betula), frequently killing them. The river birch Betula nigra is the most resistant species, while other American birches are less so. European and Asian birches have no resistance to it at all and are effectively impossible to grow in the eastern United States as a result.

It is closely related to the emerald ash borer.
