= William Caldwell =

William Caldwell may refer to:

== Boat ==
- The William Caldwell boat on Lake George, that was replaced by the John Jay (steamboat)

== Persons ==
=== Military ===
- William Caldwell (ranger) (c. 1750–1822), Irish-Canadian soldier in the American Revolution and War of 1812
- William B. Caldwell III (1925–2013), U.S. Army general
- William B. Caldwell IV (born 1954), U.S. Army general, son of William B. Caldwell III

=== Law ===
- William B. Caldwell (judge) (1808–1876), American judge
- William W. Caldwell (1925–2019), American federal judge

=== Politics ===
- William Caldwell (Illinois politician), 19th century Illinois state representative
- William Caldwell (Nova Scotia politician) (1793–1854), mayor of Halifax, Nova Scotia
- William Caldwell (Wisconsin politician), member of the 1st Wisconsin legislature of 1848
- William Bletterman Caldwell (1798–1892), governor of the Red River Settlement
- William Clyde Caldwell (1843–1905), Ontario businessman and politician
- William Murray Caldwell (1832–1870), New Brunswick businessman and political figure
- William Parker Caldwell (1832–1903), member of the United States House of Representatives

=== Other fields ===
- William Caldwell (Royal Navy officer), (died 1718), British admiral
- William Caldwell (hymnist) (1801–1857), who compiled a hymn and tune book Union Harmony
- William Caldwell (cricketer) (1878–1964), English cricketer
- William A. Caldwell (1906–1986), American journalist and columnist
- William Hay Caldwell (1859–1941), Scottish biologist
- William S. Caldwell (1821–1874), American philanthropist.
- Bill Caldwell (American football), American football player and coach

== See also ==
- Acer campestre 'William Caldwell', a field maple cultivar named for the eponymous nurseryman
- Bill Caldwell (racing driver), New Zealand racing driver in 1966 Tasman Series
- Billy Caldwell (1782–1841), Potawatomi leader
- Will Caldwell (born 1982), Australian rugby union player
- Willie Walker Caldwell (1860–1946), American writer and club woman
