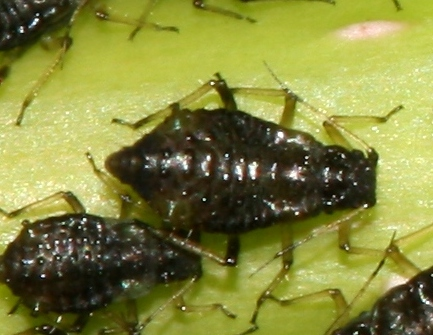
- Periphyllus

Scientific classification
- Domain: Eukaryota
- Kingdom: Animalia
- Phylum: Arthropoda
- Class: Insecta
- Order: Hemiptera
- Suborder: Sternorrhyncha
- Family: Aphididae
- Subfamily: Chaitophorinae

Tribes
- Chaitophorini; Siphini

= Chaitophorinae =

Subfamily of aphids

Chaitophorinae is a subfamily of aphids in the family Aphididae. There are about 12 genera and more than 180 described species in Chaitophorinae.

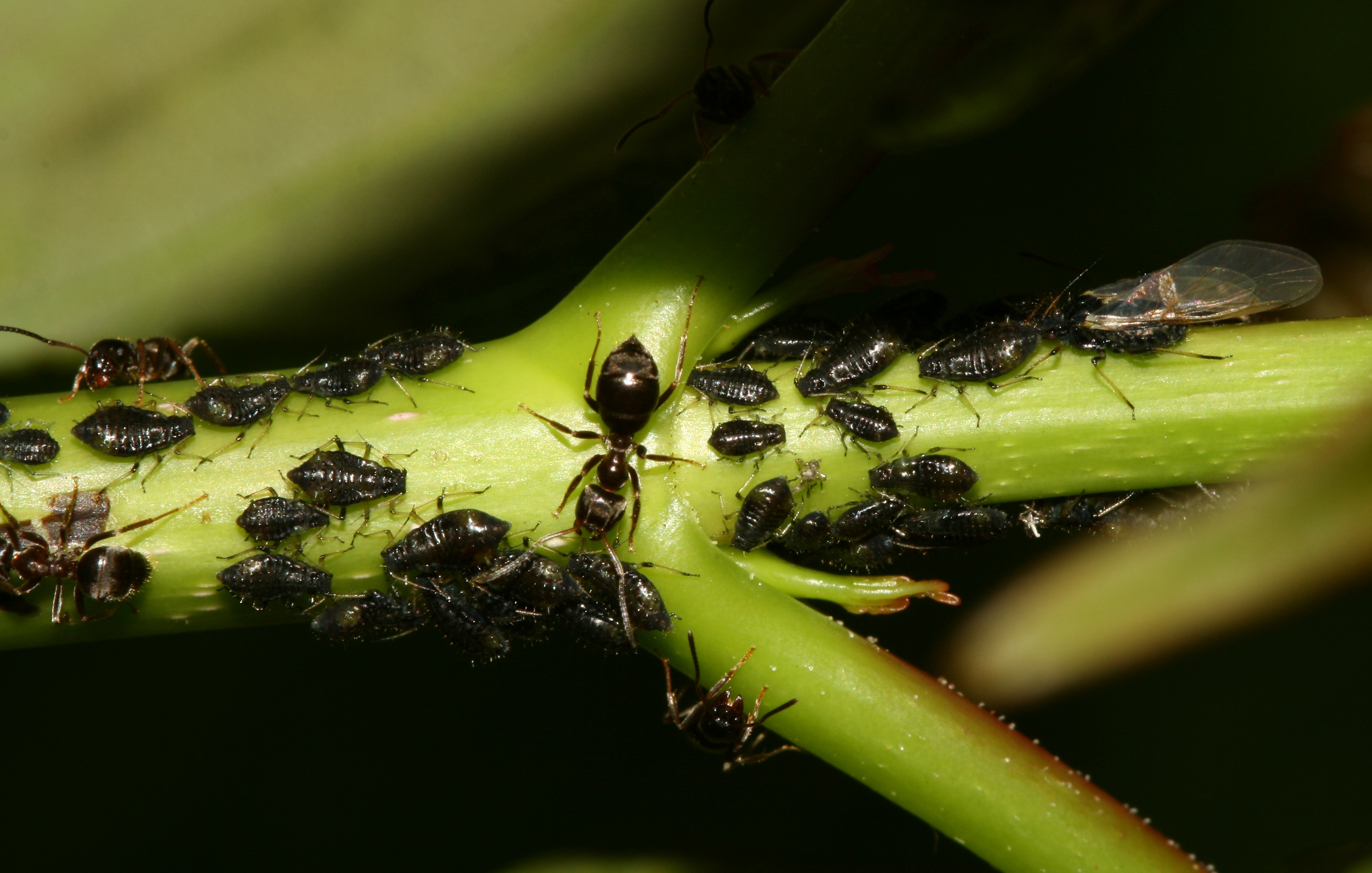
Periphyllus

== Genera ==
=== Tribe: Chaitophorini ===
- Chaitogenophorus Zhang, Qiao & Chen, 1999
- Chaitophorus Koch, 1854
- Lambersaphis
- Periphyllus Hoeven, 1863 (maple aphids)
- Pseudopterocomma MacGillivray, 1963
- Trichaitophorus Takahashi, 1937
- Yamatochaitophorus Higuchi, 1972

=== Tribe: Siphini ===
- Atheroides Haliday, 1839
- Caricosipha Börner, 1939
- Chaetosiphella Hille Ris Lambers, 1939
- Laingia Theobald, 1922
- Sipha Passerini, 1860
