= Acer miaotaiense =

Conservation status
- Near Threatened (IUCN 3.1)

Scientific classification
- Kingdom: Plantae
- Clade: Tracheophytes
- Clade: Angiosperms
- Clade: Eudicots
- Clade: Rosids
- Order: Sapindales
- Family: Sapindaceae
- Genus: Acer
- Section: Acer sect. Platanoidea
- Species: A. miaotaiense

Binomial name
- Acer miaotaiense P.C.Tsoong

Species of maple

Acer miaotaiense (syn. Acer miyabei subsp. miaotaiense (P.C.Tsoong) E.Murray) is a species of maple endemic to China. It grows in mixed forests of southeastern Gansu, southwestern Henan, northwestern Hubei, southern Shaanxi, and Zhejiang.

It is a medium-sized deciduous tree growing to 25 m tall, with rough, grey-brown bark. The leaves are three-lobed, 4–9 cm long and 5–8 cm broad, with a 6–7 cm long petiole; the petiole bleeds white latex if cut. The flowers are produced in spring at the same time as the leaves open, yellow-green, in erect corymbs. The fruit is a samara with two winged seeds aligned at 180°, each seed 8 mm wide, flat, with a 2 cm wing.

It is closely related to Acer miyabei from Japan, and Acer campestre from Europe. It is a rare tree, considered "Vulnerable" by the International Union for Conservation of Nature (IUCN).
