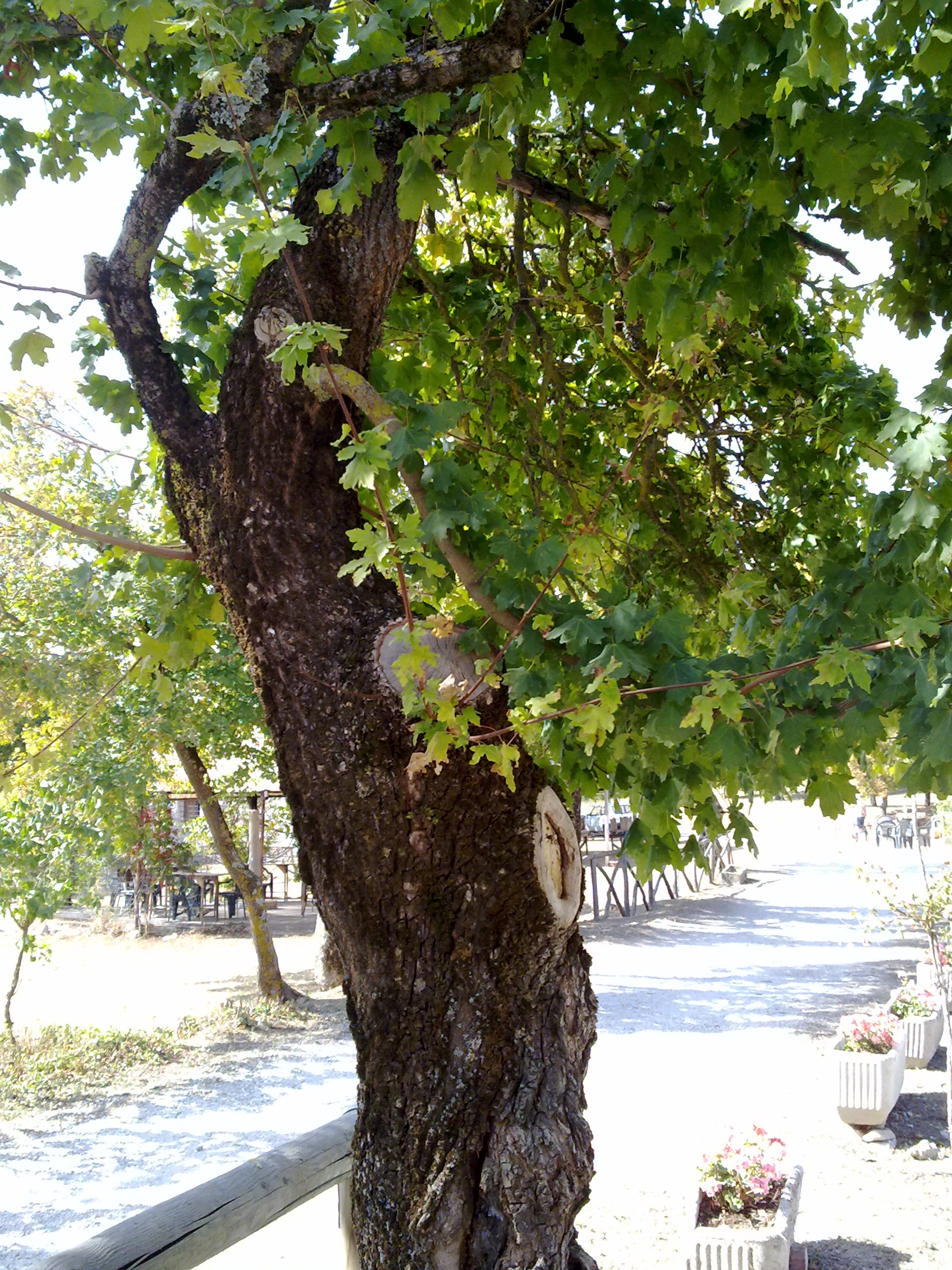

Scientific classification
- Kingdom: Plantae
- Clade: Embryophytes
- Clade: Tracheophytes
- Clade: Spermatophytes
- Clade: Angiosperms
- Clade: Eudicots
- Clade: Rosids
- Order: Sapindales
- Family: Sapindaceae
- Genus: Acer
- Section: Acer sect. Platanoidea
- Species: A. campestre

Binomial name
- Acer campestre L.
- Distribution

Synonyms
- List: Acer affine Hoffmanns. ex Walp.; Acer affine Opiz; Acer bedoi Borbás; Acer campestre f. aegaeicum Drenk.; Acer campestre f. boomii Geerinck; Acer campestre f. ferrugineum Jovan.; Acer campestre f. josifovicii (Gajic & Diklic) Jovan.; Acer campestre f. jovanovicii Gajic & Drenk.; Acer campestre f. latilobum Jovan.; Acer campestre f. platypterum Jovan.; Acer collinum Ten.; Acer erythrocarpum Opiz ex Rouy & Fouc.; Acer haplolobum Borbás; Acer heterolobum Opiz; Acer heterotomum Borbás; Acer marucum Walp.; Acer microphyllum Opiz; Acer orthopteron Masson ex Opiz; Acer palmatisectum Ortmann; Acer polycarpon Opiz; Acer praecox Opiz; Acer quinquelobatum J.Wagner ex Opiz; Acer robustum Opiz; Acer suberosum Dumort.; Acer tauricum Dippel; Acer tauschianum Opiz; Euacer affine Opiz; Euacer austriacum Opiz; Euacer campestre (L.) Opiz; Euacer eriocarpon Opiz; Euacer erythrocarpon Opiz; Euacer kablikianum Opiz; Euacer leiocarpon Opiz; Euacer molle Opiz; Euacer obtusilobum Opiz; Euacer orthopteron Opiz; Euacer pallens Opiz; Euacer palmatisectum Opiz; Euacer polycarpon Opiz; Euacer quinquelobatum Opiz; Euacer rubescens Opiz; Euacer rubrotinctum Opiz; Euacer scharkense Opiz; Euacer stenopteron Opiz; Euacer subquinquelobatum Opiz

= Acer campestre =

Species of flowering plant

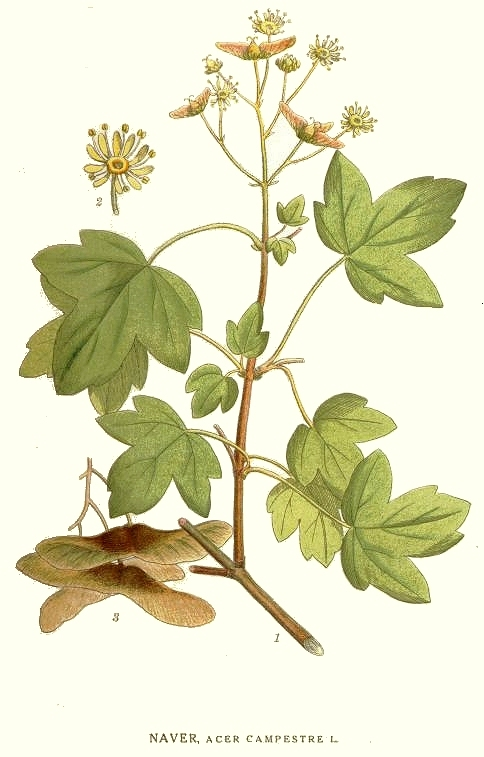

Acer campestre, known as the field maple, is a flowering plant species in the family Sapindaceae. It is native to much of continental Europe, Britain, southwest Asia from Turkey to the Caucasus, and north Africa in the Atlas Mountains. It has been widely planted, and is introduced outside its native range in Europe and areas of the US and Western Australia with suitable climate.

== Description ==
It is a deciduous tree reaching 15–25 m (49–82 ft) tall, with a trunk up to 1 m (3 ft 3 in) in diameter, with finely fissured, often somewhat corky bark. The shoots are brown, with dark brown winter buds. The leaves are in opposite pairs, 5–16 cm (2.0–6.3 in) long (including the 3–9 cm (1.2–3.5 in) petiole) and 5–10 cm (2.0–3.9 in) broad, with five blunt, rounded lobes with a smooth margin. Usually monoecious, the flowers are produced in spring at the same time as the leaves open, yellow-green, in erect clusters 4–6 cm (1.6–2.4 in) across, and are insect-pollinated. The fruit is a samara with two winged achenes aligned at 180°, each achene is 8–10 mm (0.31–0.39 in) wide, flat, with a 2 cm (0.79 in) wing.

The two varieties, not accepted as distinct by all authorities, are:

- Acer campestre var. campestre - downy fruit
- Acer campestre var. leiocarpum (Opiz) Wallr. (syn. A. campestre subsp. leiocarpum) - hairless fruit

The closely related Acer miyabei replaces it in eastern Asia.

== Distribution ==
The native range of field maple includes much of Europe, including Denmark, Poland and Belarus, England north to southern Scotland (where it is the only native maple), southwest Asia from Turkey to the Caucasus, and north Africa in the Atlas Mountains. In many areas, the original native range is obscured by widespread planting and introductions. In North America it is known as hedge maple and in Australia, it is sometimes called common maple. In Nottinghamshire, England, it was known locally as dog oak.

== Ecology ==
Field maple is an intermediate species in the ecological succession of disturbed areas; it typically is not among the first trees to colonise a freshly disturbed area, but instead seeds in under the existing vegetation. It is very shade-tolerant during the initial stages of its life, but it has higher light requirements during its seed-bearing years. It exhibits rapid growth initially, but is eventually overtaken and replaced by other trees as the forest matures. It is most commonly found on neutral to alkaline soils, but more rarely on acidic soil.

Diseases include a leaf spot fungus Didymosporina aceris, a mildew Uncinula bicornis, a canker Nectria galligena, and verticillium wilt Verticillium alboatrum. The leaves are also sometimes damaged by gall mites in the genus Aceria, and the aphid Periphyllus villosus.

== Cultivation and uses ==
The field maple is widely grown as an ornamental tree in parks and large gardens. The wood is white, hard and strong, and used for furniture, flooring, wood turning and musical instruments, though the small size of the tree and its relatively slow growth make it an unimportant wood. It has an OPALS rating of 7.

It is locally naturalised in parts of the United States and more rarely in New Zealand. The hybrid maple Acer × zoeschense has A. campestre as one of its parents.

The tree has gained the Royal Horticultural Society's Award of Garden Merit.

=== Cultivars ===
Over 30 cultivars of Acer campestre are known, selected for their foliage or habit, or both; several have been lost to cultivation.

- 'Carnival'
- 'Commodore'
- 'Compactum'
- 'Eastleigh Weeping'
- 'Elegant'
- 'Elsrijk'
- 'Evenly Red'
- 'Fastigiatum'
- 'Green Weeping'
- 'Leprechaun'
- 'Lienco'
- 'Marjolein'
- 'Nanum'
- 'Pendulum'
- 'Postelense'
- 'Pulverulentum'
- 'Punctatissimum'
- 'Puncticulatum'
- 'Queen Elisabeth'
- 'Red Shine'
- 'Royal Ruby'
- 'Ruby Glow'
- 'Schwerinii'
- 'Senator'
- 'Silver Celebration'
- 'Silver Dawn'
- 'Streetwise'
- 'Tauricum'
- 'Tomentosum'
- 'William Caldwell'
- 'Zorgvlied'

== Bonsai ==
Acer campestre (and the similar A. monspessulanum) are popular among bonsai enthusiasts. The dwarf cultivar 'Microphyllum' is especially useful in this regard. A. campestre bonsai have an appearance distinct from those selected from some other maples such as A. palmatum with more frilly, translucent, leaves. The shrubby habit and smallish leaves of A. campestre respond well to techniques encouraging ramification and leaf reduction.

== Gallery ==
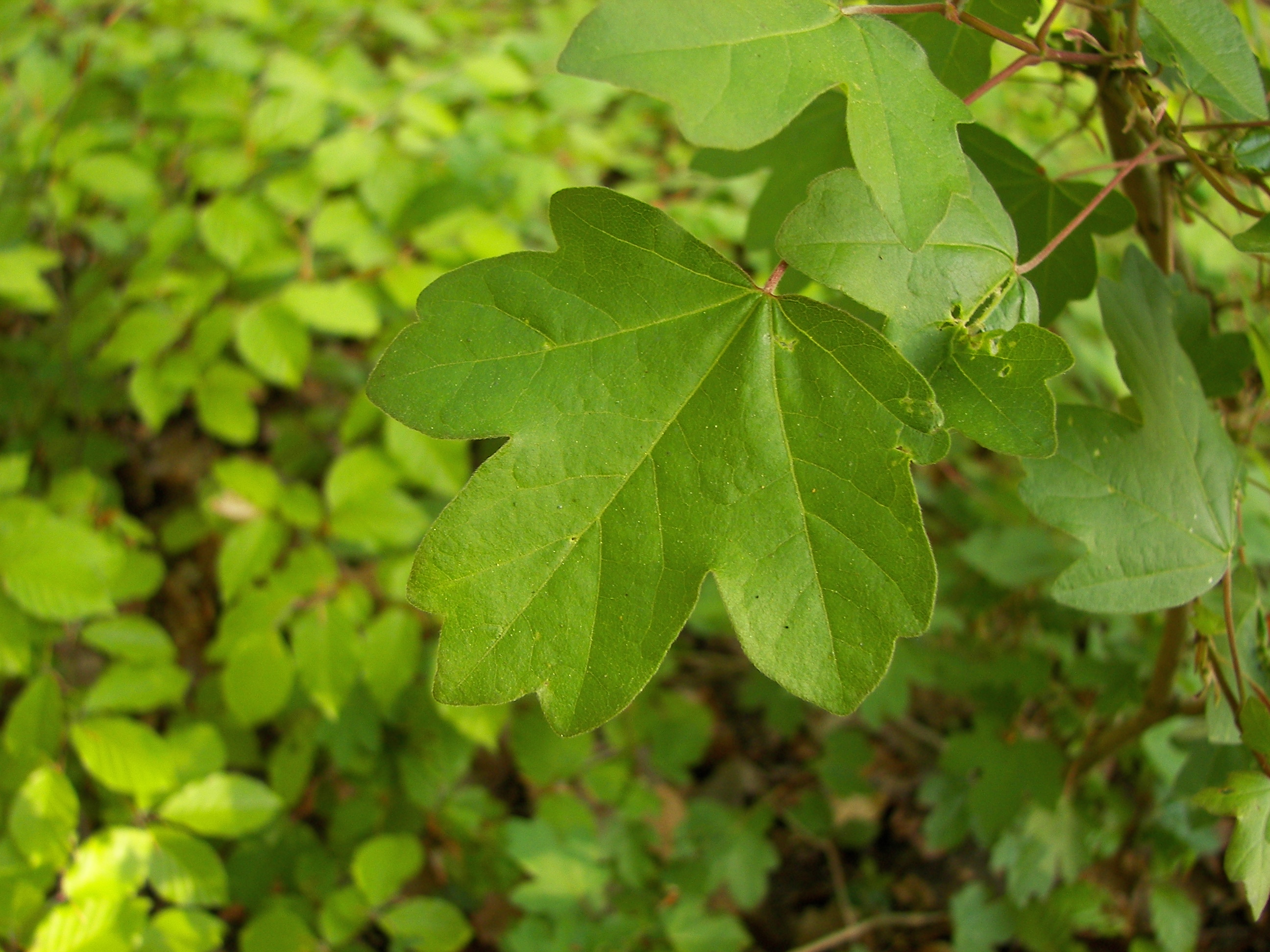
Field maple leaf

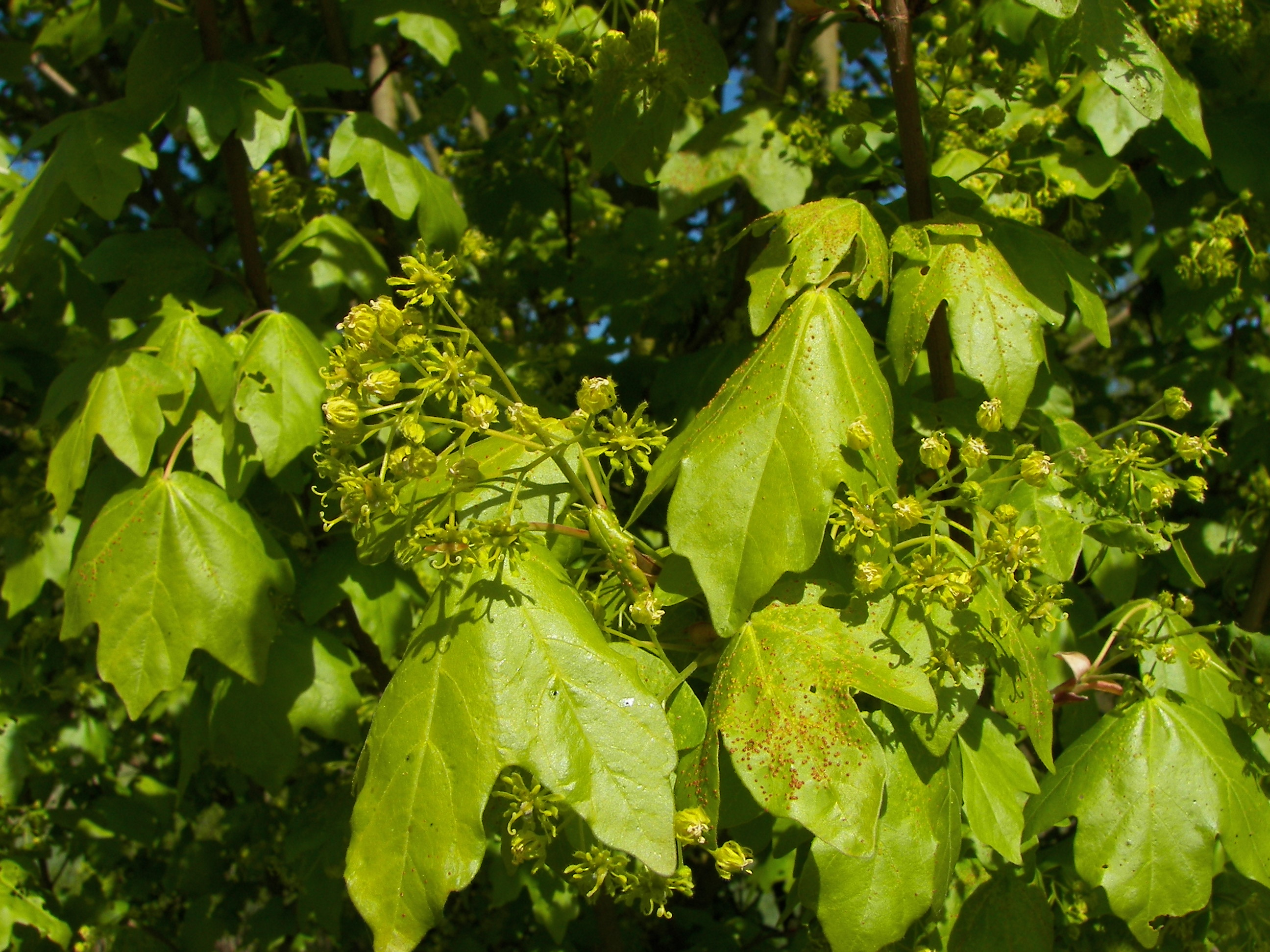
Leaves and flowers

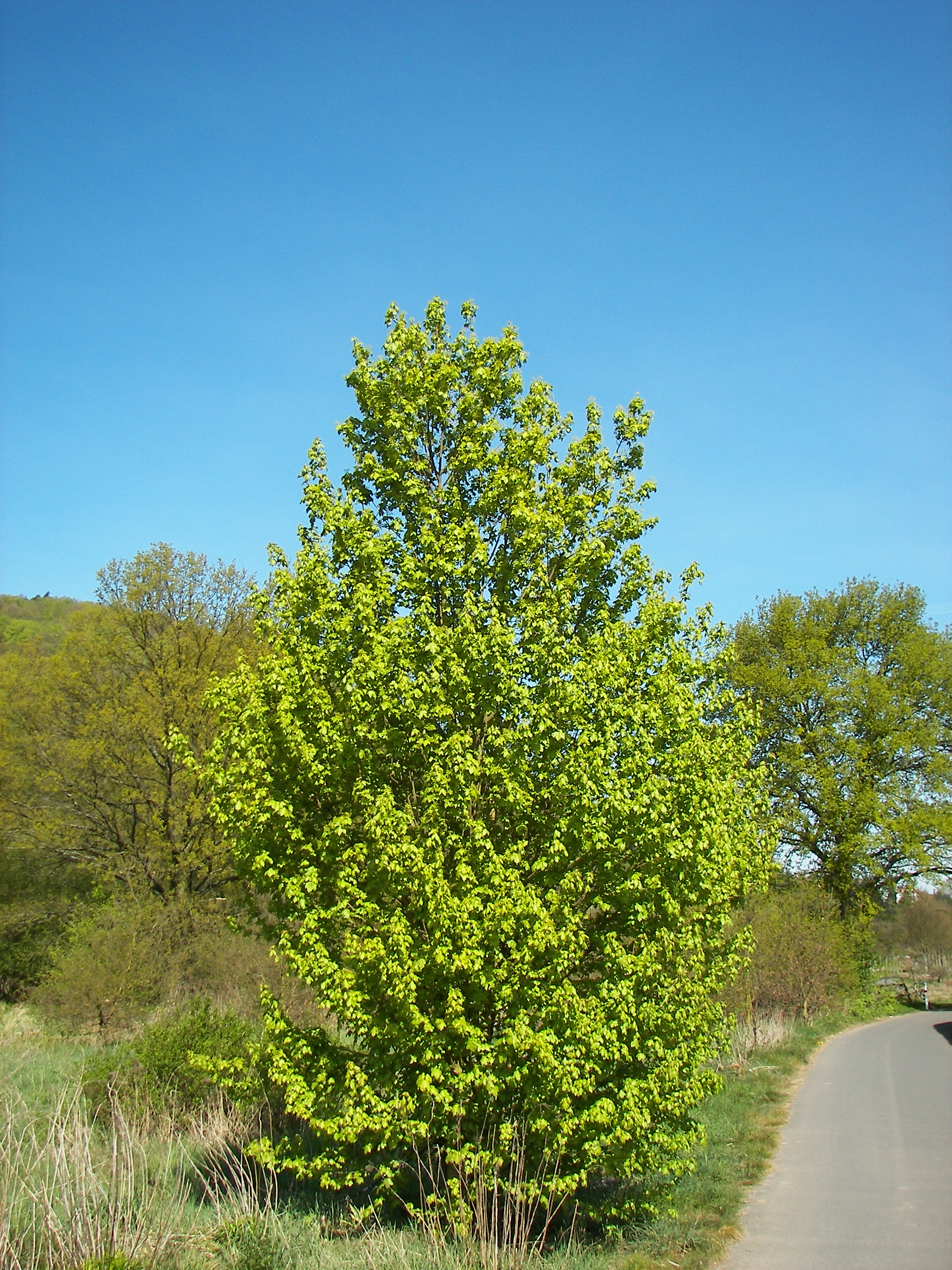
Field maple, Germany

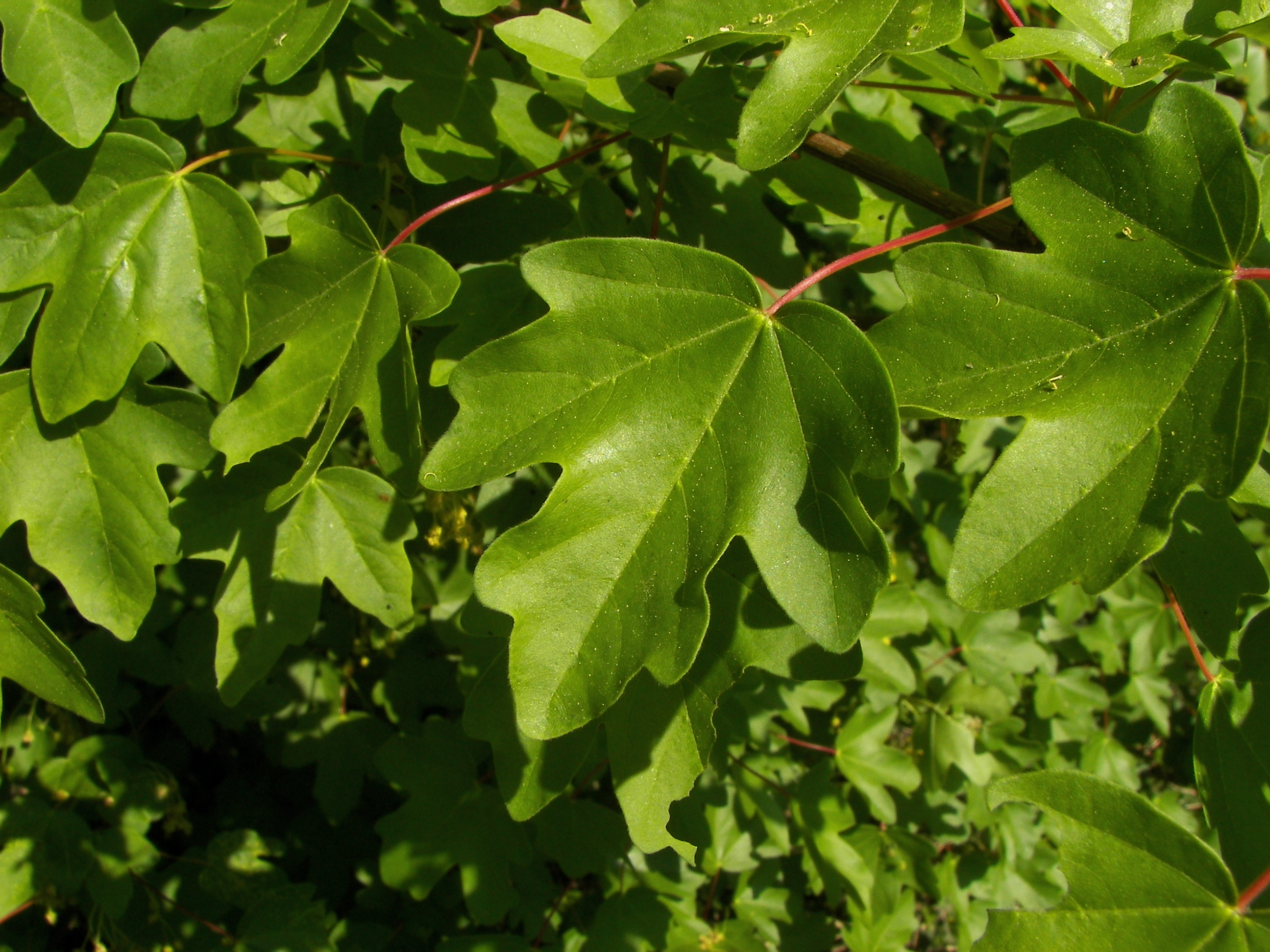
Leaves

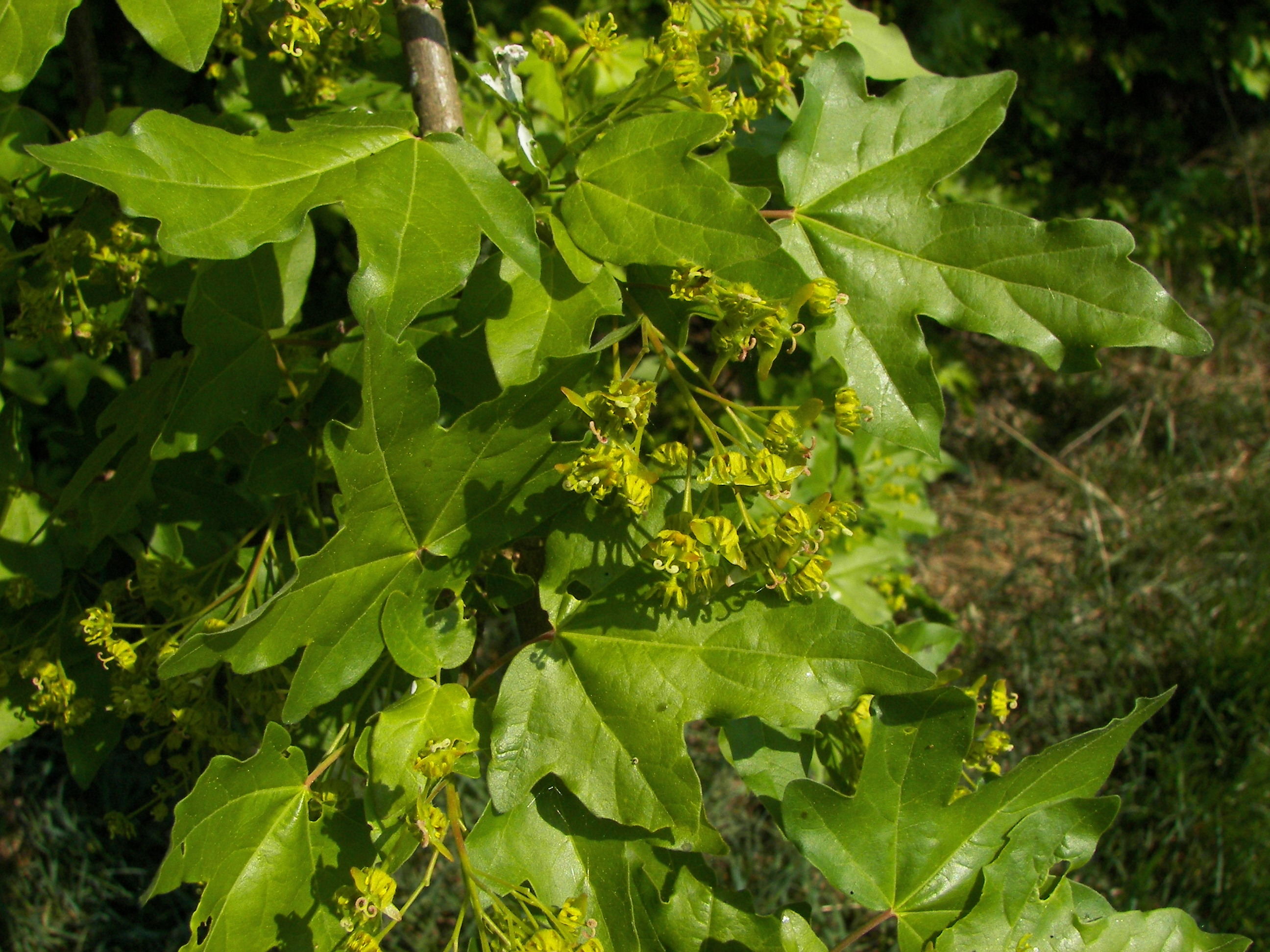
Foliage in spring

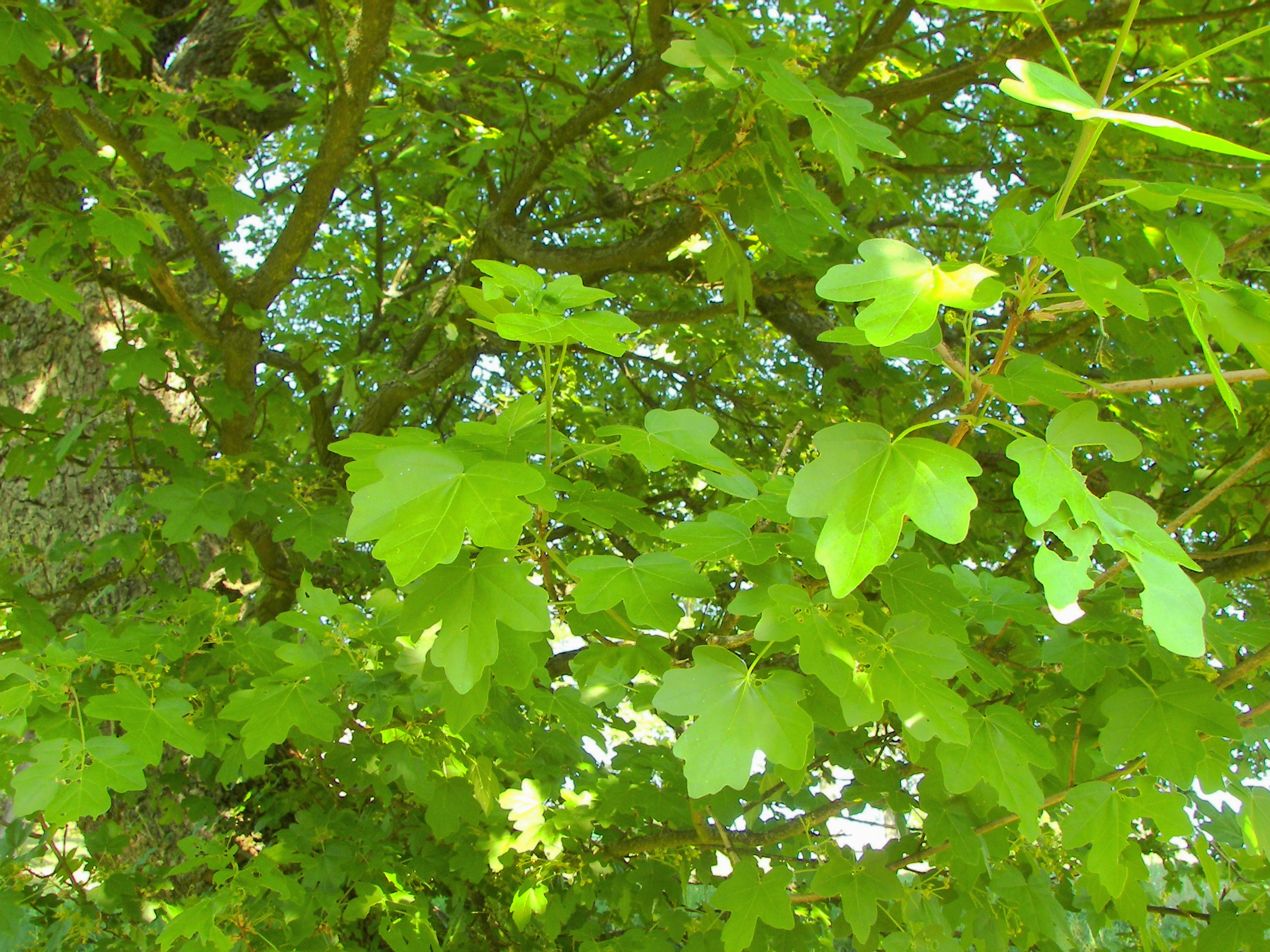
Field maple, Hesse, Germany

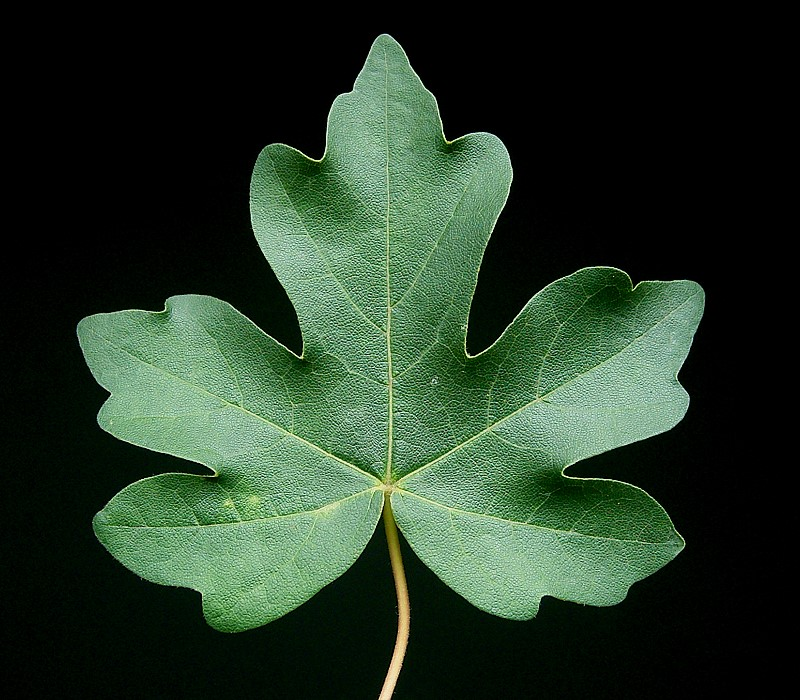
Field maple leaf

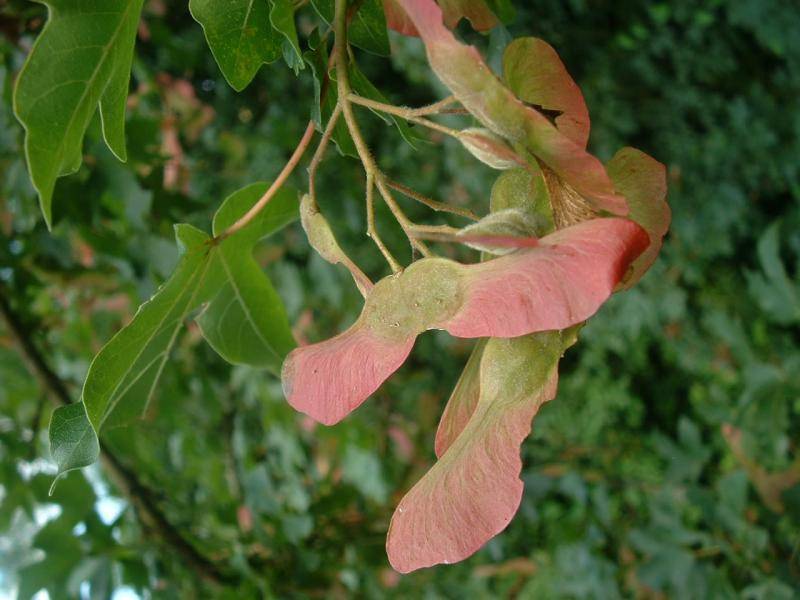
Fruits

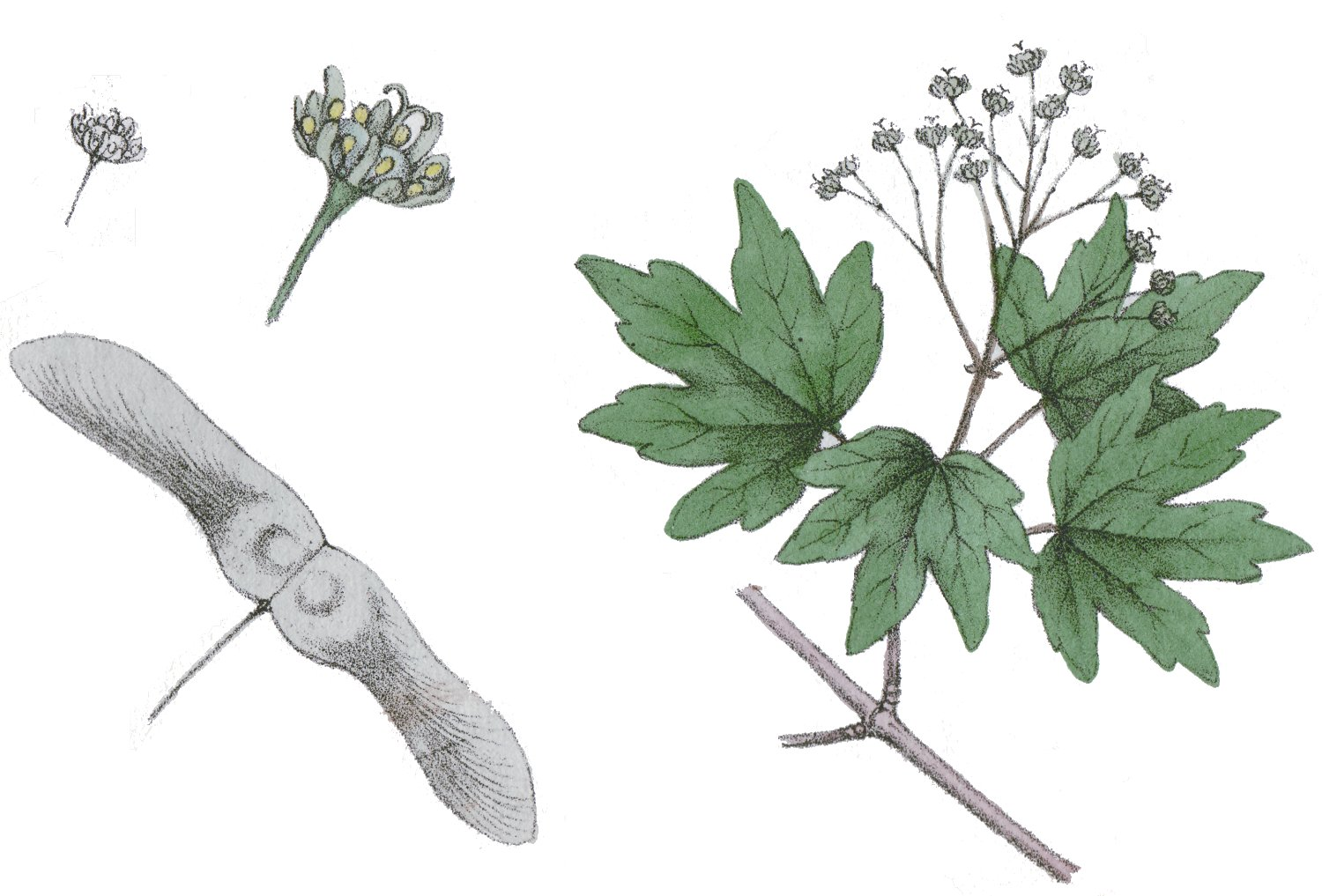
Field maple

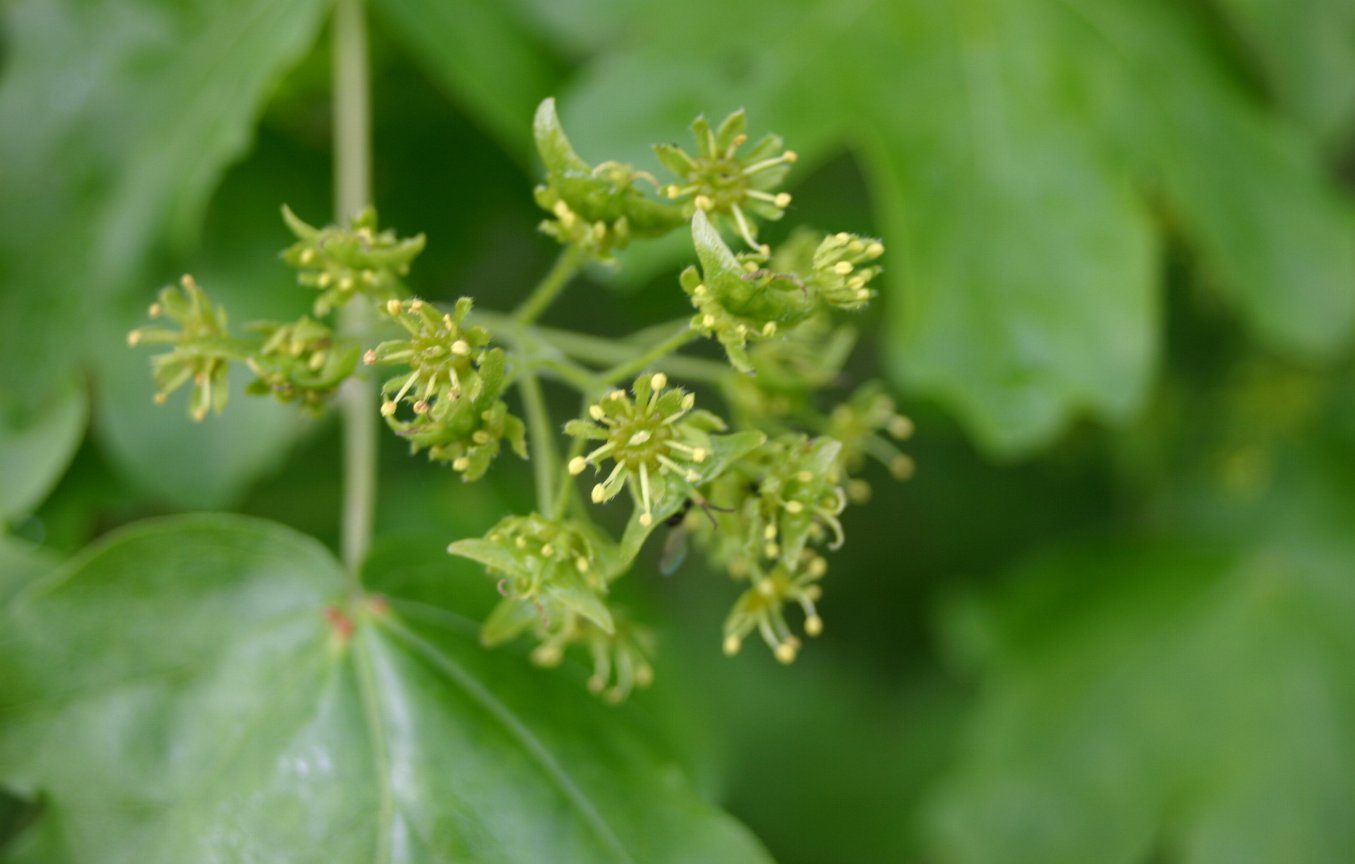
Field maple flowers

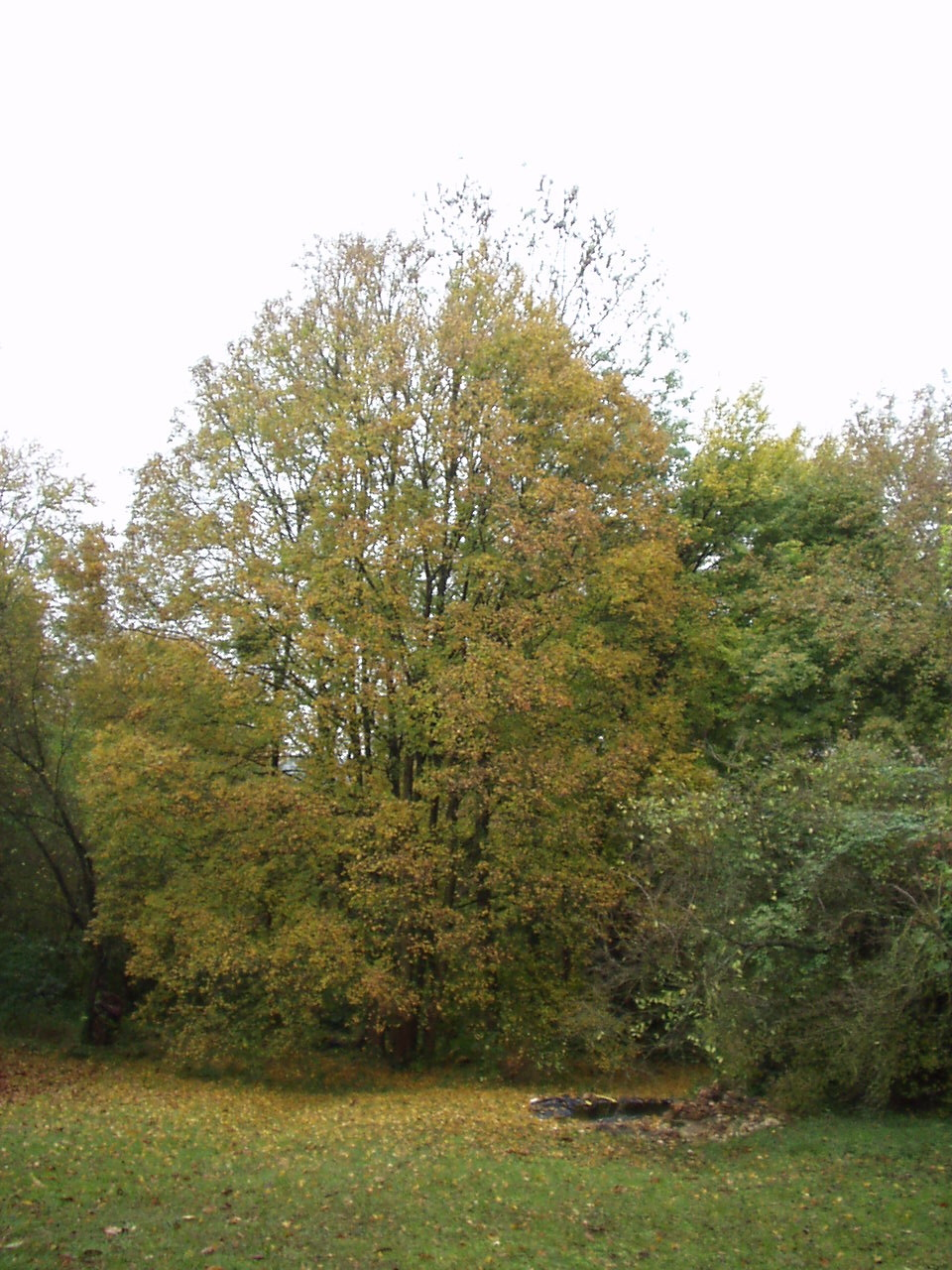
Field maple in autumn, France

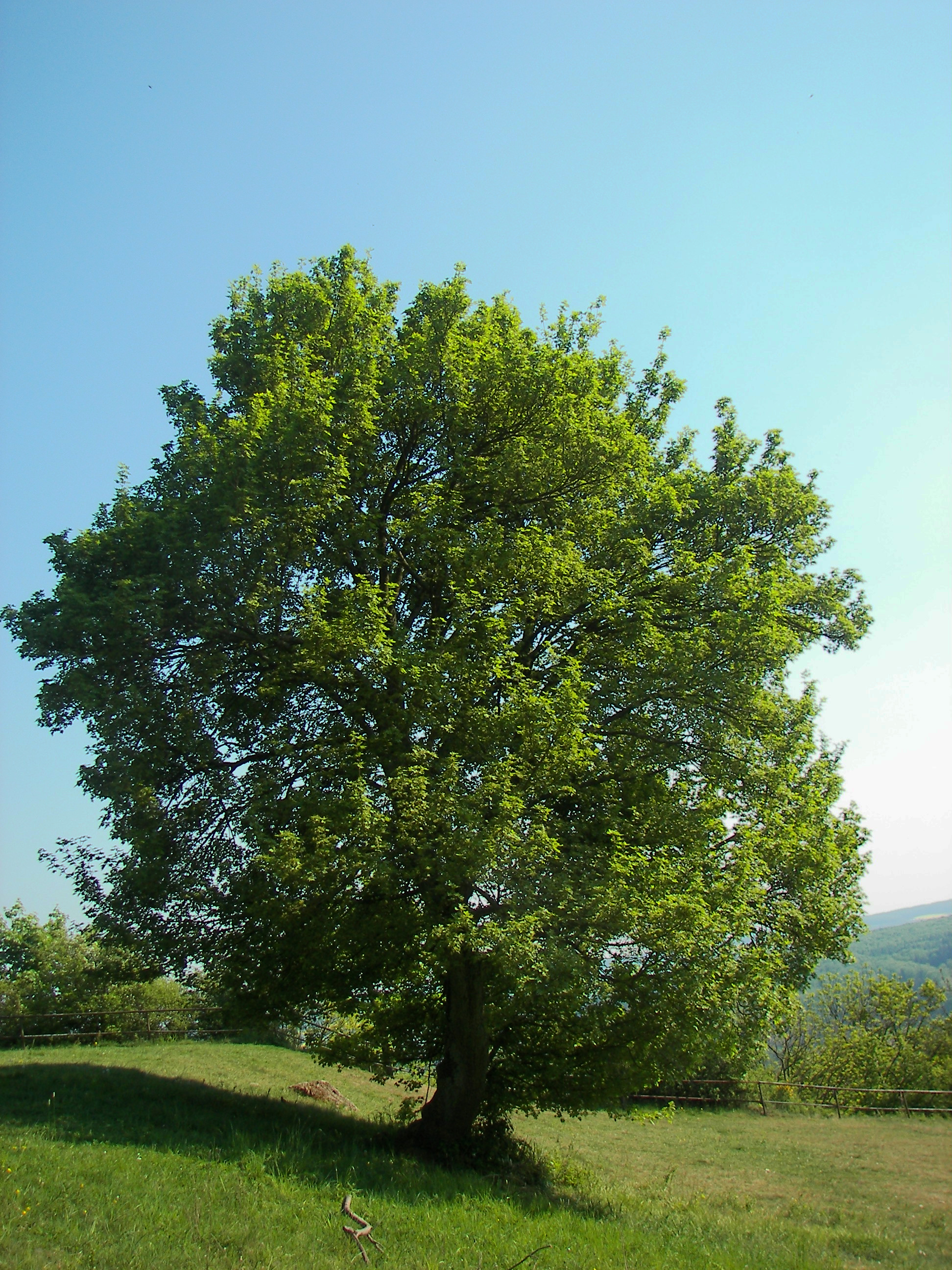
Field maple, Germany

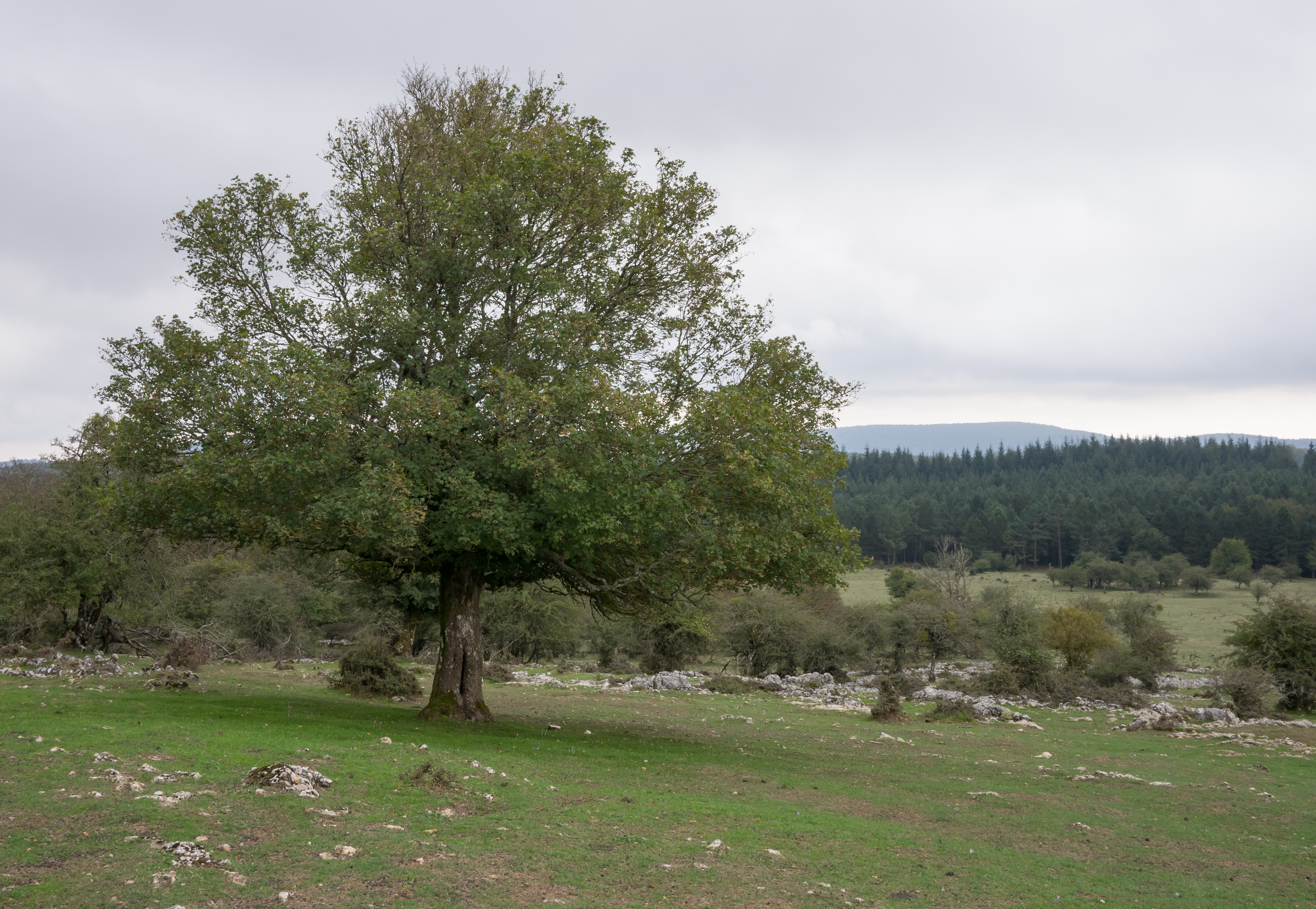
Field maple, Spain

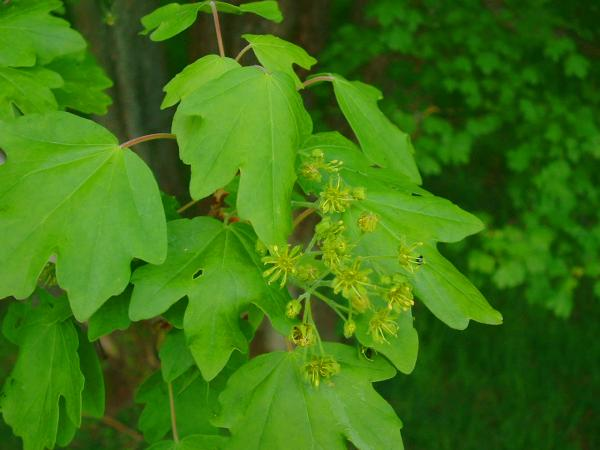
Leaves and inflorescence

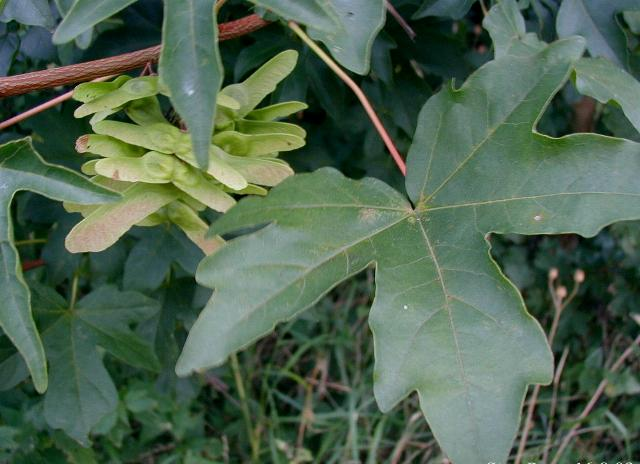
Leaves and fruits

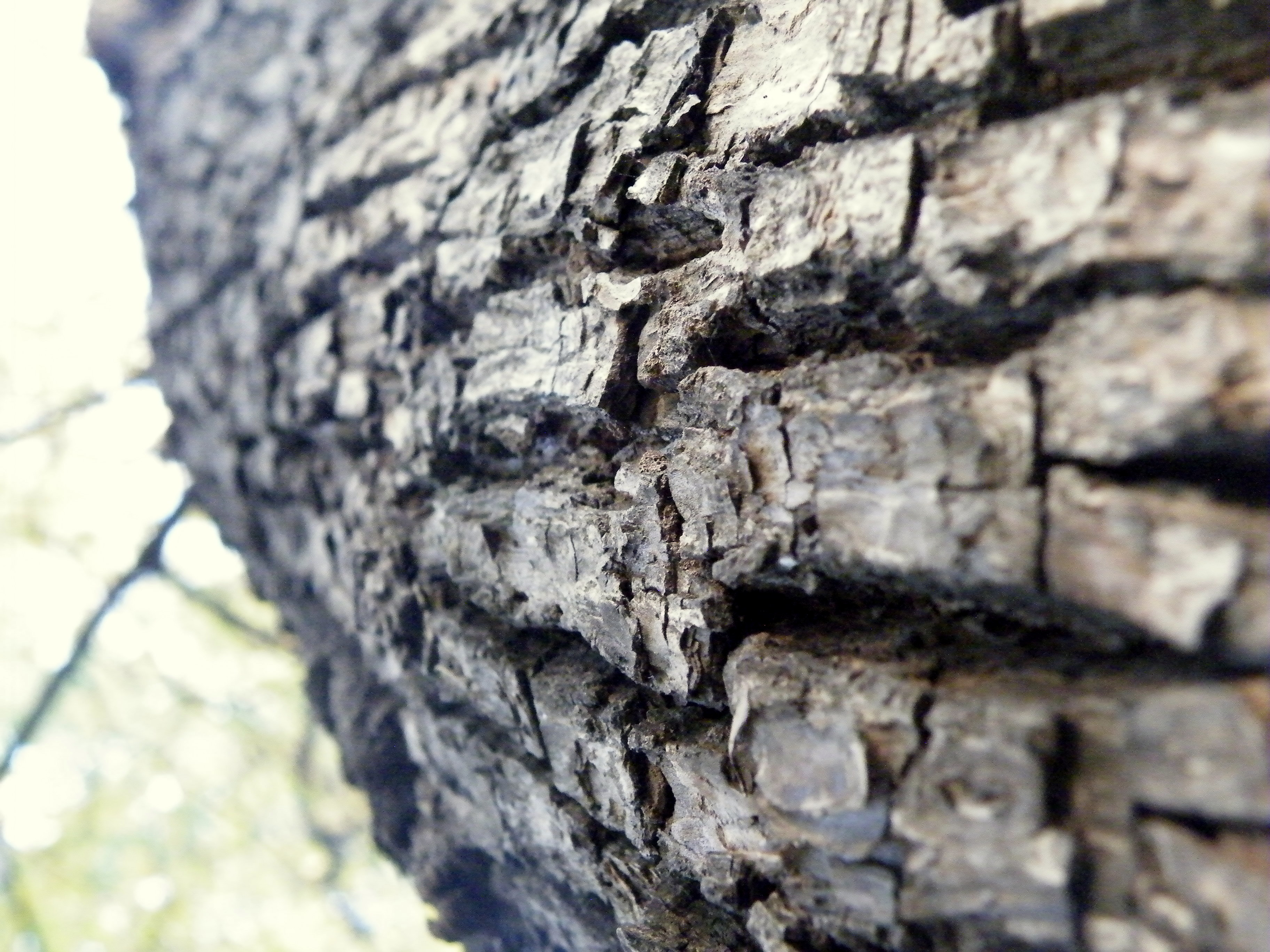
Trunk

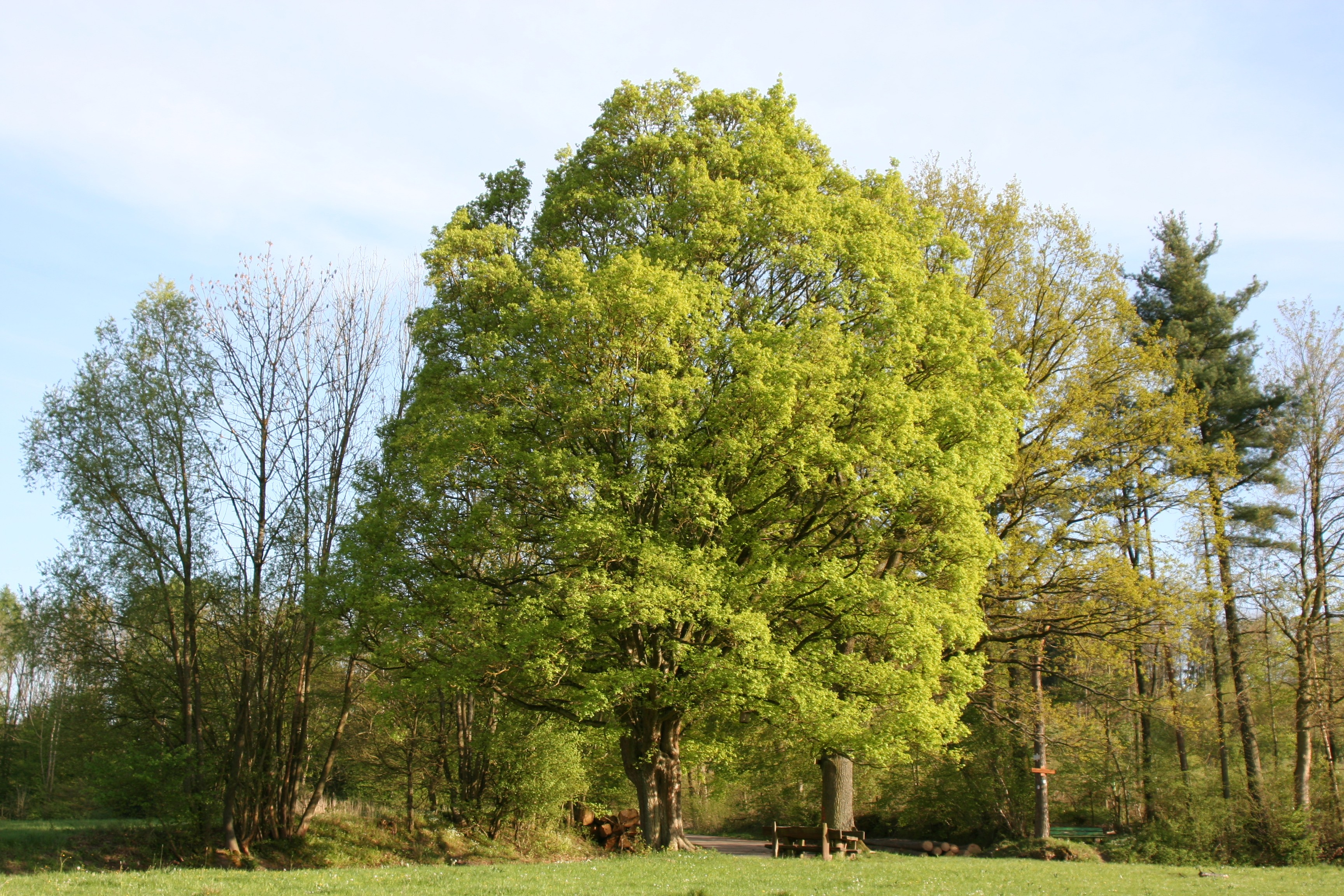
Maple field tree, Weinsberg

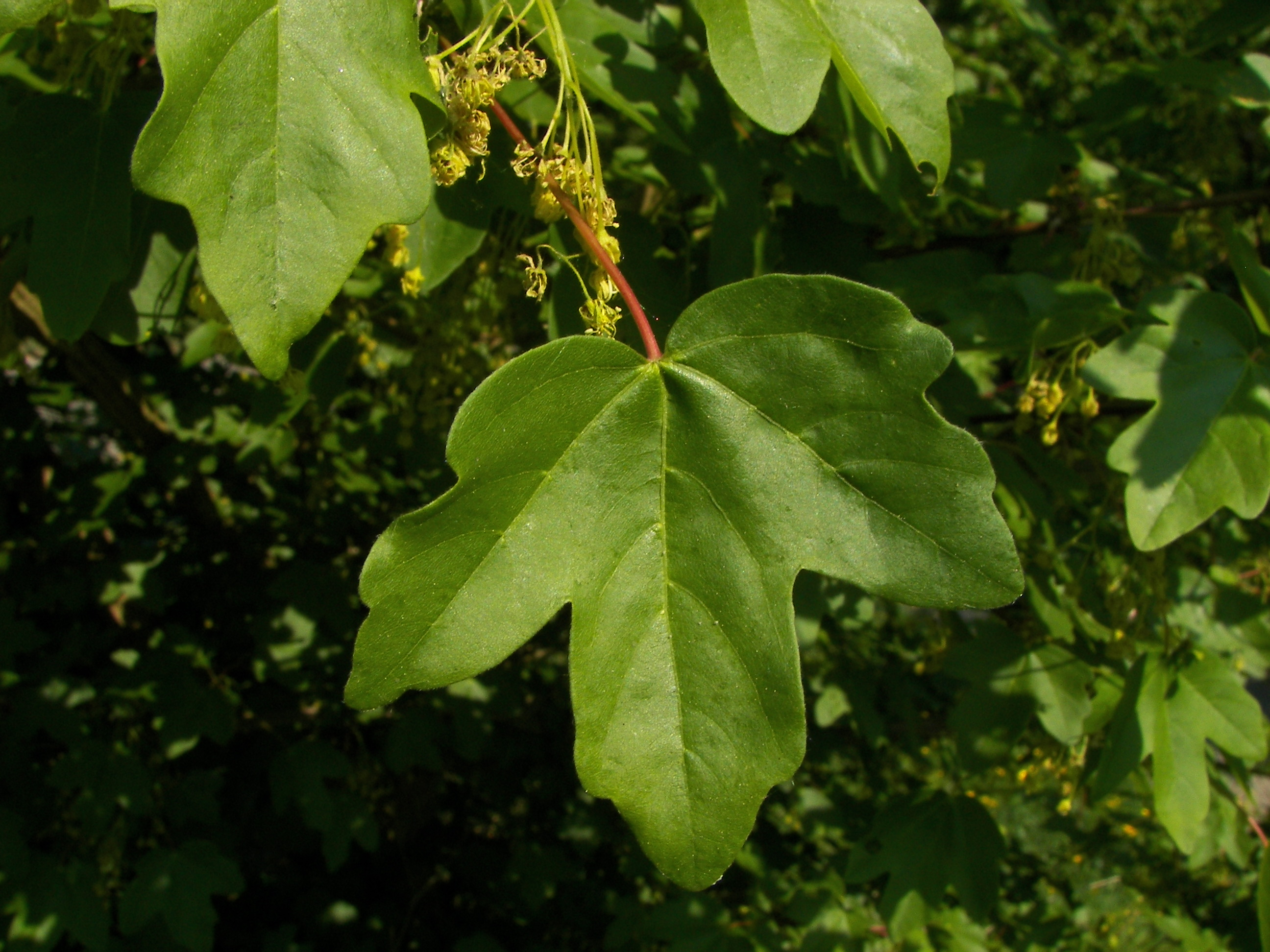
Leaf
