= Acer campestre 'Elsrijk' =

Maple cultivar

Acer campestre
- Cultivar: 'Elsrijk'
- Origin: Ohio, USA

The Field Maple cultivar Acer campestre 'Elsrijk' is an American selection made from established city trees in Ohio in 1953, and introduced to the Netherlands in 1985, where it has become the most popular campestre cultivar.

== Description ==
The tree is grows to a height of < 10 m, its crown of short, twiggy branches bearing dense green foliage, turning golden yellow in autumn. The tree is relatively free of mildew.

== Cultivation ==
As with the species, 'Elsrijk' thrives best in a semi shade position, on a fertile, well-drained soil.

== Accessions ==
=== Europe ===
- Royal Horticultural Society Gardens, Wisley, Surrey, UK.
- Sir Harold Hillier Gardens, Ampfield, Hampshire, UK. Acc. nos. 1986.0127, 1986.0128.
