= Sipha flava =

Scientific classification
- Domain: Eukaryota
- Kingdom: Animalia
- Phylum: Arthropoda
- Class: Insecta
- Order: Hemiptera
- Suborder: Sternorrhyncha
- Family: Aphididae
- Genus: Sipha
- Species: S. flava

Binomial name
- Sipha flava (Forbes, S.A., 1885)

Synonyms
- Chaitophorus flavus Forbes, S.A., 1885; Sipha carrerai Blanchard, Everard Eel, 1939

Species of insect

Sipha flava is a species of aphid in the family Aphididae. It is native to North America. Its common name is yellow sugarcane aphid.

This aphid is an agricultural pest of corn, rice, sorghum, and sugarcane. It also infests lawn and pasture grasses. It has been noted on crabgrasses, barleys, panic grasses, paspalums, pennisetums, and wheats. It can also be found on some sedges.

== Control Method ==
This aphid is known to affect yield but its effect greatly varies depending which life stage of the crop is under attack. Because of its toxins, the sugarcane leaves infested by S. flava turn from green to yellow/reddish. To stop the infestations, chemical control is often the chosen solution though alternatives exist, such as augmentative or conservative biological control using Tithonia diversifolia
