= Kingo Miyabe =

Japanese botanist and mycologist (1860–1951)

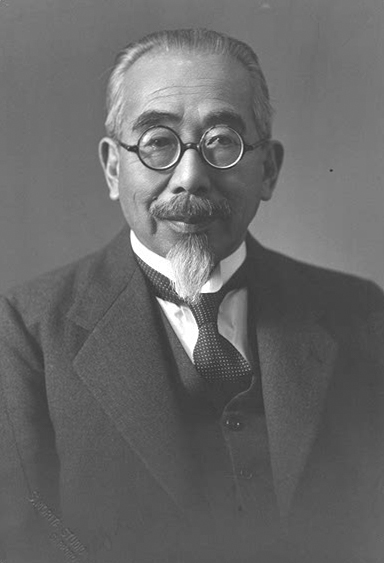
Kingo Miyabe

Kingo Miyabe (April 27, 1860 – March 16, 1951) was an influential Japanese botanist and mycologist. He received the Order of Cultural Merit in 1946 and was an honorary international member of the American Academy of Arts and Sciences.

== Life ==
Miyabe was a graduate of the second class of students at Sapporo Agricultural College. In 1882, he was a founding member of the Tokyo Botanical Society. As part of broader efforts to develop expertise in scientific botany in Japan, Miyabe traveled to Harvard University to study with Asa Gray and William G. Farlow, where he earned a D.Sc. Miyabe returned to Japan in 1889 as a professor at Sapporo Agricultural College.

Miyabe maintained active correspondence with botanists around the world, including Curtis Gates Lloyd. He is best known for a series of floristic studies of Japan, including The Flora of the Kurile Islands (1890), The Laminariaceae of Hokkaido (1902), Plants in Sakhalin (1915, co-authored with Tsutomu Miyake), Flora of Hokkaido and Saghalien (co-authored with Yushun Kudo), and Icones of the essential forest trees of Hokkaido (1920–1923, co-authored with Yushun Kudo and Chusuke Suzaki).

A Christian, Miyabe helped found the Sapporo Independent Church. He was also lifelong friends with the Christian thinker and evangelist Uchimura Kanzō.

The "Miyabe maple" (Acer miyabei), which he first identified in Hokkaido in the 1880s, now grows at botanic gardens and arboreta around the world.
