= Acer campestre 'Elegant' =

Maple cultivar

Acer campestre
- Cultivar: 'Elegant'
- Origin: Netherlands

The Field Maple Acer campestre cultivar 'Elegant' was released by the Gelderse Nursery in Opheusden, Netherlands in 1990.

== Description ==
The tree grows to a height of < 15 m / About 49 Feet, and has a compact, slender, ovoid crown comprising ascending branches, making it particularly suitable as a street tree.

== Cultivation ==
As with the species, 'Compactum' thrives best in a semi shade position, on a fertile, well-drained soil.

== Synonymy ==
'Elegant' is probably synonymous with 'Huibers Elegant'.

== Accessions ==
None known.
