= Acer campestre 'Compactum' =

Maple cultivar

Acer campestre
- Cultivar: 'Compactum'
- Origin: England

The Field Maple Acer campestre cultivar 'Compactum' was first described in 1839.

== Description ==
The tree is mop-headed, the crown a mass of tangled branches. Rarely growing to a height of > 3 m, its leaves are similar in shape but slightly smaller than those of the species.

== Cultivation ==
The tree requires assiduous training to restrain its vigorous growth. As with the species, 'Compactum' thrives best in a semi shade position, on a fertile, well-drained soil.

== Synonymy ==
'Compactum' is also known as Acer campestre 'Nanum'.

== Accessions ==
=== Europe ===
- Sir Harold Hillier Gardens, Ampfield, Hampshire, UK. Acc. nos. 1977.1968, 1977.5384.
