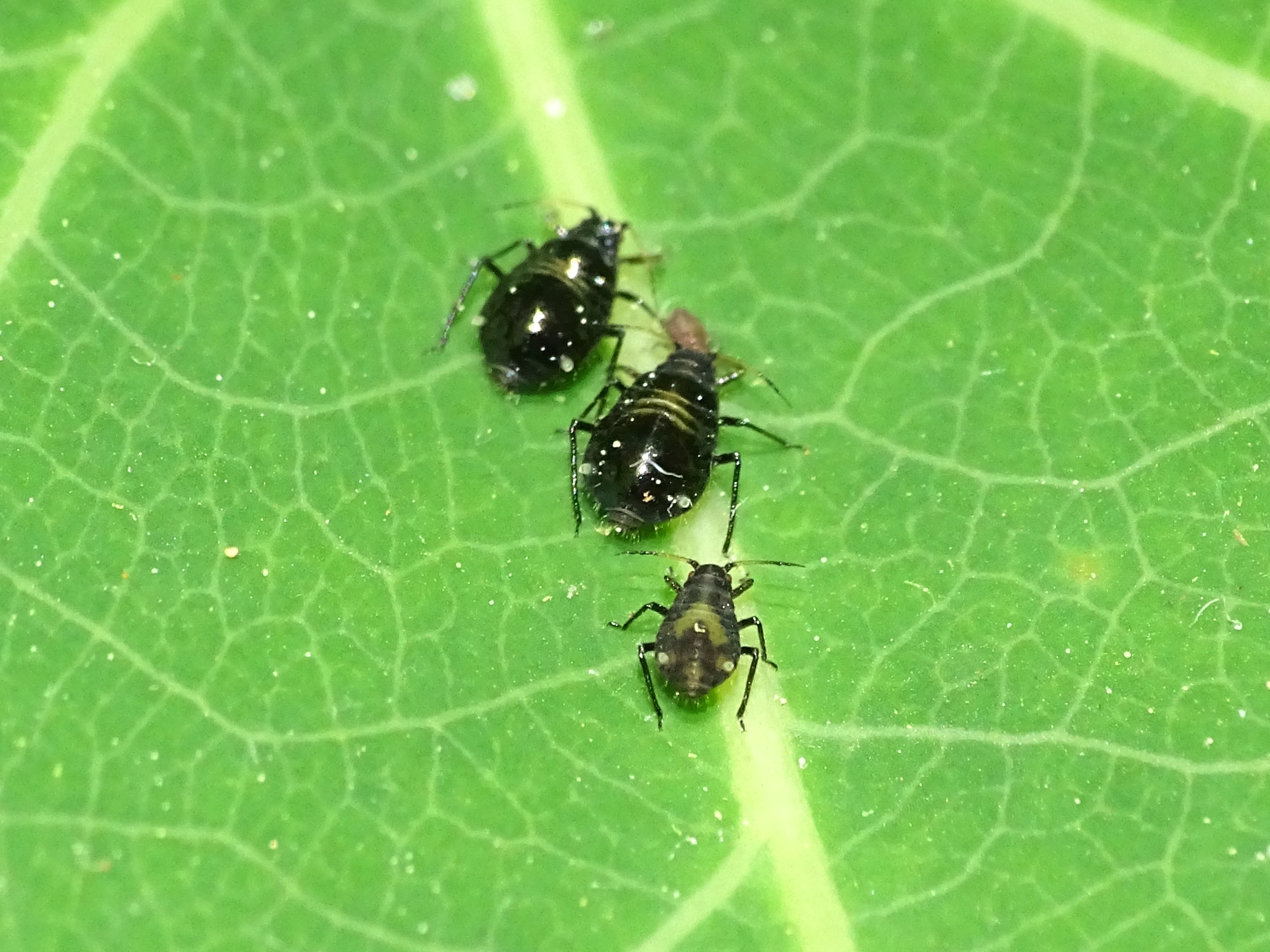
- Chaitophorus on Populus sp. in Ottawa, Canada

Scientific classification
- Domain: Eukaryota
- Kingdom: Animalia
- Phylum: Arthropoda
- Class: Insecta
- Order: Hemiptera
- Suborder: Sternorrhyncha
- Family: Aphididae
- Subfamily: Chaitophorinae
- Genus: Chaitophorus; Koch, 1854

= Chaitophorus =

Genus of true bugs

Chaitophorus is a genus of aphids first described by Carl Ludwig Koch in 1854. This genus includes roughly 90 to 110 species, and is found in North America, Europe, and Asia.

== Hosts ==
Chaitophorus aphids are generally host-specific. They are known primarily from members of Salicaceae, namely Populus and Salix. However, some species are known from Vitaceae, Apiaceae, and Asteraceae.

== Identification ==
The morphological differences between species of this genus are fairly subtle. As a result, identification to the species can be challenging, and knowledge of the host plant can be valuable.

== Ecological relationships ==
Parasitoids such as Lysiphlebus salicaphis and Aphelinus aureus are known to specialize in this genus.

Like many aphids, Chaitophorus are known to have generally mutualistic relationships with ants. This relationship is described to have independently evolved at least 5 times within the genus. As they feed on phloem sap, the aphids excrete honeydew, which is in turn consumed by ants. Some members of this genus (C. populialbae and C. populeti) have been shown to vary the nutritional content of their honeydew depending on the presence of attending ants; however this has been shown to not be universal to the genus.
