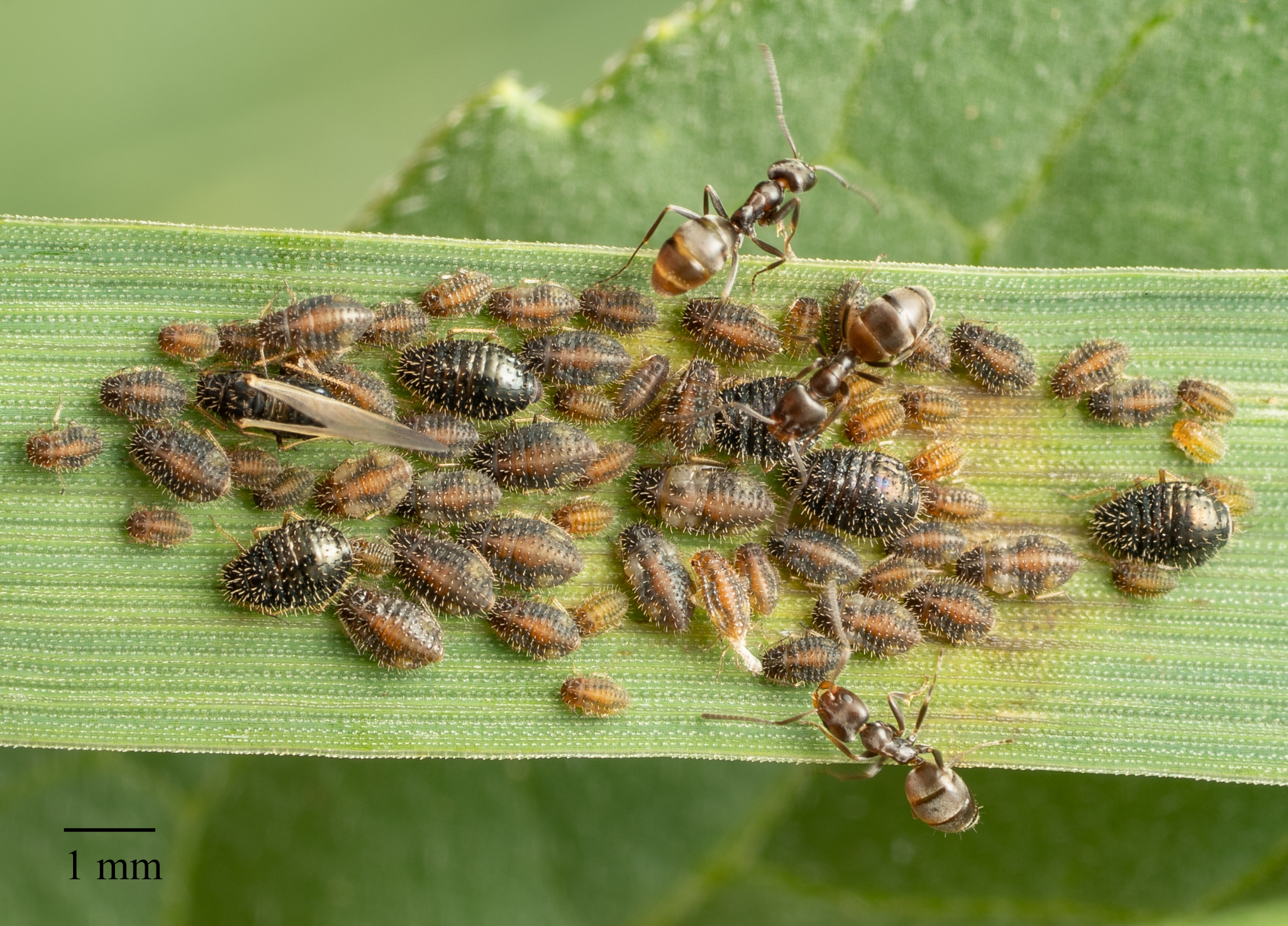

Scientific classification
- Kingdom: Animalia
- Phylum: Arthropoda
- Class: Insecta
- Order: Hemiptera
- Suborder: Sternorrhyncha
- Family: Aphididae
- Genus: Sipha
- Species: S. maydis

Binomial name
- Sipha maydis Passerini, 1860

= Sipha maydis =

Species of aphid

Sipha maydis is a species of aphid. It is a pest of millets.
