= Acer campestre 'Carnival' =

Maple cultivar

Acer campestre
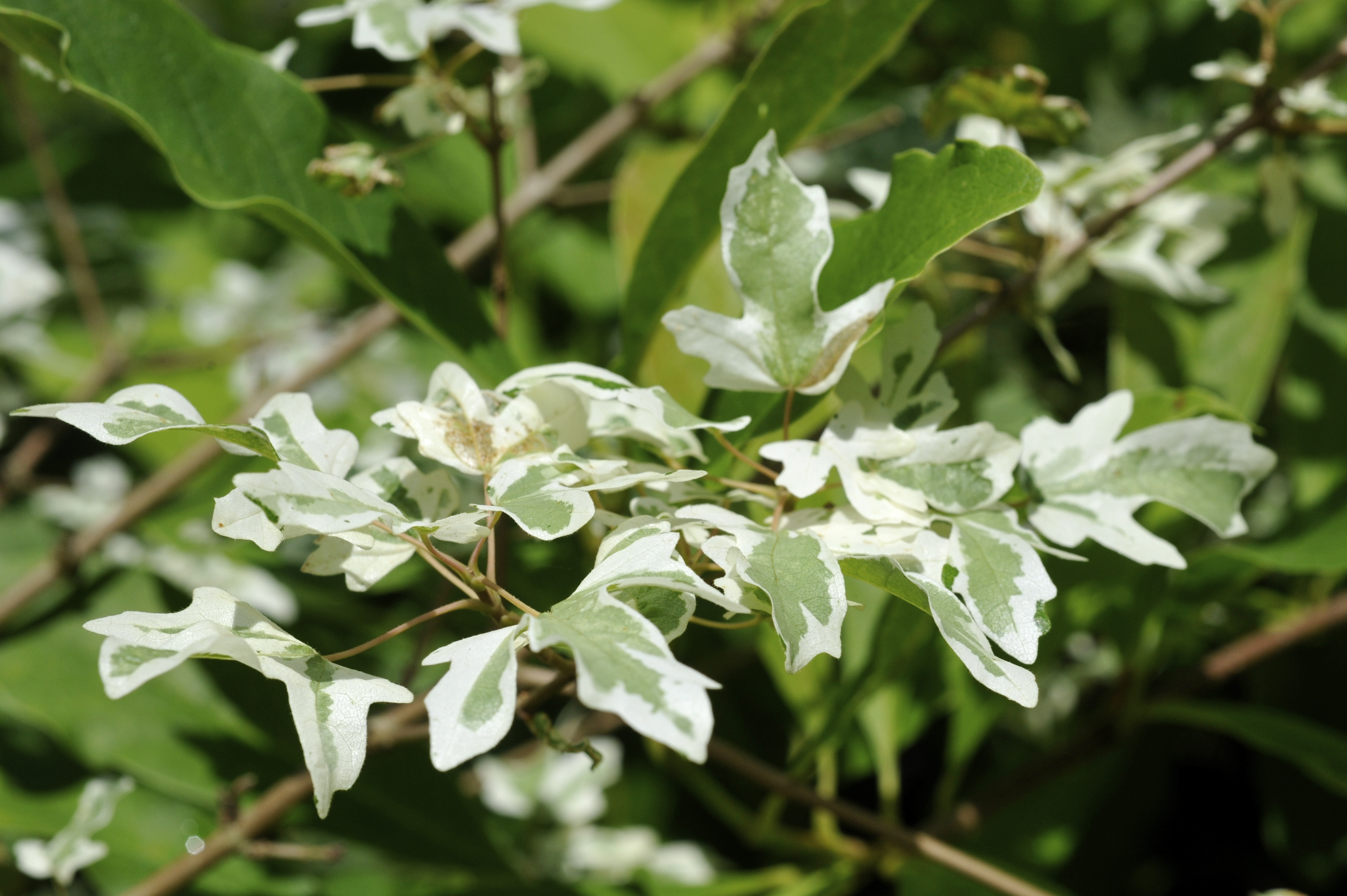
- Cultivar: 'Carnival'
- Origin: Netherlands

The Field Maple Acer campestre cultivar 'Carnival' arose from a chance seedling discovered in the Netherlands in 1989.

== Description ==
The tree is noted for its foliage colour, bright pink on emergence, maturing to cream with a green centre. It rarely grows to a height of > 3 m, with a crown spread of the same dimension. Really brightens up a shady area. Autumn foliage colour is golden-yellow. Yearly leaf colouration is variable. Some years there is more variegation, while others less. All-white branches are possible, but often die back. Otherwise, even with heavy variegation, the plant is very robust.

== Cultivation ==
As with the species, 'Carnival' thrives best in a semi shade position, on a fertile, well-drained soil. Prefers alkaline soils, but will grow on most any type. In cooler climates, can take more sun without burning. In most others, afternoon shade is preferred, and it will grow amazingly well in full-shade.

== Accessions ==
=== Europe ===
- Royal Horticultural Society Gardens, Wisley, Surrey, UK. Accession details not known.
