= Woman's Civic Betterment Club =

The Woman's Civic Betterment Club (also known as the "WCBC" or the "Roanoke Civic Betterment Club") of Roanoke, Virginia, was started in 1907 to improve the sanitation and civic life in Roanoke and the surrounding area. The Club issued a press release claiming that the “object of this organization shall be to gain the co-operation of all loyal and progressive citizens in making the Magic City a city beautiful, to promote health and cleanliness, to advance present conditions, and to point to higher ideals.” The WCBC is significant in southwestern Virginia because it was an early woman's organization to push for political change and political power at a time when women had little or no power except by persuading men to change their minds.

== History ==
At a time when women could not vote, the WCBC was established to improve the Roanoke city infrastructure. Started in 1906 and established in 1907, by 1913 it had 180 members, and was part of the Women's Clubs of America.

These women formed the Women's Civic Betterment Club in 1906, a civic club to have lasting effects on Roanoke's future. It was a move of "responsible and responsive women of the city which would ultimately lead to the formation of a library, a juvenile court, a nursery school for the children of working mothers, and a local unit of the American Cancer Society. The maiden effort, however, was a plan for the city, only the fifth such ever done for any city. The club, led by Mrs. Lucian H. Cocke and Mrs. M.M. Caldwell, engaged John Nolen of Boston to develop a comprehensive plan for the development of Roanoke".

The club is noted for its influence in city planning, public sanitation and engineering, cultural activities, and publications. "While the city fathers had been successful in attracting investors and industry, they had done little to address the city’s cultural needs and improve its public spaces. The city mothers, however, knew that sanitation, safety, good schools, playgrounds and cultural opportunities were equally important to the city’s future. In 1906, they formed the Woman’s Civic Betterment Club to tackle these issues. (Sarah Butler’s mother, Willie Walker Caldwell, was one of the organizers of the WCBC.) They commissioned studies and lobbied city council for improvements – with mixed results."

== City planning ==
Concerned with the open sewers, abundant saloons and traffic problems, and rapid growth. In less than twenty years, from 1882 to 1900, Roanoke had grown from 669 citizens to 21,000. In 1907 the WCBC held a "Great Fall Festival" in order to raise money to hire a city planner. They were able to raise enough money to hire John Nolen. At the festival, they were able to raise the equivalent of $125,000 (they raised $5,000.00, or about $125,000.00 in 2017 dollars). This was enough to hire Nolen and two bacteriologists who were able to report on Roanoke's sanitation problems. "On December 7, 1906, more than 100 women turned out for an urgently-called meeting in Roanoke Virginia, to discuss matters of the utmost importance. Two days later, the group met again and chartered the Roanoke Civic Betterment Club. Its mission: to ensure sanitary conditions in the city's market district, to provide a healthier community for their families, and to ensure quality education for their children."

Some of the recommendations of John Nolen included planting trees along the streets; renaming the streets "avenues" for those going east-west, and "Streets" for those running north-south; creating parkways and playgrounds; dividing the city into four districts. In preparing the Melrose-Rugby Historic District in Roanoke, the effects of the Woman's Civic Betterment Club were appreciated. The Woman's Civic Betterment Club also worked with Nolen on the Riverland/Walnut Hills, Roanoke, Virginia neighborhood in promoting sanitation and overcrowding. At the turn of the century, Riverland housed railway workers and their families, and contributed to overcrowding and unhealthy tenement conditions.

Under contract, Nolen focused on the development of a civic center, which led to the construction of the Beaux-Arts style Municipal Building in 1915. He also made provisions for paved streets with gutters, sewage systems and other sanitation improvements in the residential neighborhoods.

In addition to producing the reports on civic improvement, the WCBC also hired speakers to promote and discuss the benefits of city improvement. Mr. J. Horace McFarland of Harrisburg, Pennsylvania, to come and speak to the public. During his talk, J. Horace McFarland, president of the American Civic Improvement Association, criticized several areas of Roanoke. Indeed, below his window at the hotel was an open "pit of slime and filth". The WCBC paid other speakers to come, including bacteriologists who criticized Roanoke's potential for typhoid, tuberculosis and polluted milk.

When the Woman's Civic Betterment Club turned in Nolen's work, it was filed away by the city fathers. The city finally adopted Nolen's plans in the 1930s, and the extensive greenway system, riverside drive and Mill Mountain Park are part of that legacy of John Nolen and the Woman's Civic Betterment Club. "While Nolen’s work deserves public recognition in Roanoke, the women of the WCBC had a greater role in shaping Roanoke into the city it is today. Roanoke did little to recognize the work of these women over one hundred years ago; perhaps now is the time to honor their contributions."

== Library ==
While the Woman's Civic Betterment Club was not able to get all their goals accomplished, one goal for a public library was completed. Sarah Poage Caldwell Butler, married to William Wilson Samuel Butler and mother to Dr. M. Caldwell Butler, was trained in Library Science and had worked at the New York Public Library before her marriage. She worked with the WCBC to petition the Roanoke City Council to establish a library. "Possibly believing they were presenting an insurmountable hurdle, council members told Butler that if she could raise $30,000, the city would contribute the rest. In one week’s time (appropriately, Library Week April 19–24), Butler raised $27,000!" Sarah Butler also worked with Miss Lucy Addison to open a public library for the black neighborhoods in segregated Roanoke, and the Gainsboro Branch Public Library opened seven months later, on December 13, 1921. "Sarah Butler died on December 2, 1983, at age 91. In a 1971 interview, she stated that getting a public library in Roanoke was her proudest civic achievement."

== Roanoke cook book ==
While much of the cost of producing the first city plan came from the Great Fall Festival, additional money was needed. It was provided from the sales of the WCBC "The Roanoke Cook Book, Favorite Recipes by Some of Roanoke's Good Housekeepers." Compiled by Mrs. Albert A. Stone from the WCBC members and published quickly in 1907, the 164 page book was a financial success. In addition to the recipes, the book also included advertising of local businesses and services to offset the costs of publication. "Cook book sales helped pay for one of the first city plans ever drawn up; and a woman's civic club was the first organized body to arrange for the preparation of a city plan by a competent professional man."

Over a hundred years later, the WCBC cook book is still referred to as an example of period cooking in Southwestern Virginia." The book says on page one: "Purchasers may congratulate themselves on acquiring so much kitchen lore in clear and condensed form." The recipes are so unique, not necessarily in the ingredients, but in the descriptions and the "flavor" of the times that is given. I don't know about the taste of the food if you choose to follow the recipes, but I'm sure you will enjoy reading them." In addition to the cooking recipes, advice is also given on using some of the recommended dishes for treating medical conditions." The chicken broth, for example, is intended for sick children: "If patient has a fever or is very ill, set the broth aside until cold, and then remove the grease, after which heat and serve."

== Legacy ==
The Woman's Civic Betterment Club was formed at a time when women could not vote, hold elected office, or influence civic government directly. Yet, within only a few years the citizens of Roanoke as seen marked improvement in the acquisition of land for public parks; school facilities; better city sanitation; abatement of dust and dirt nuisances on the streets. While they were unable to directly influence the city council, they were able to press for the first public library in Roanoke, and the purchase of parks, playgrounds, and pressed for a juvenile court. As a writer in 1912 said, "Their cooperation in work for Roanoke's uplift and welfare has been of signal service to the community, and the part they have taken in the general scheme of development work is worthy of the highest praise."

== Publications ==
- BLACKSBURG [VIRGINIA] WOMAN'S CLUB. RECORDS, 1907-1972. 7.0 cu. ft. Founded as the Women's Civic Betterment Club in 1907; disbanded in 1970. Involved in civic improvement projects including community beautification, public health, civil defense, charity and cultural programs. Records include correspondence, minutes, financial records, scrapbooks and printed material. Finding aid available in EAD on the Virginia Heritage Project database. Ms1963-002. http://vaheritage.org/
- Emerson, C. E. Sanitary Roanoke: Report to the Committee on Civic Improvement. [Place of publication not identified]: [publisher not identified], 1907. by C.E. Emerson, Jr. and Ezra B. Whitman, Civil and Sanitary Engineers, Baltimore, Md.; presented to the city of Roanoke, by the Woman's Civic Betterment Club of Roanoke, Virginia.
- Nolen, John. Remodeling Roanoke; Report to the Committee on Civic Improvement. [Roanoke, Va.]: [Stone Prtg. and Manufacturing Co.], 1907. Electronic version: https://babel.hathitrust.org/cgi/pt?id=nyp.33433082493283
- Nolen, John, and John L. Hancock. John Nolen Papers. 1890. Abstract: Collection consists of personal and professional correspondence, letterbooks, addresses, biographical data, diaries, scrapbooks, school notes and textbooks, syllabi, lectures and outlines, typescript papers and articles, printed material, policy directives, card files, sample contracts, projects files and reports, slides, photographs, negatives, plans, blueprints, drawings, charts, and maps relating to Nolen's work in city planning, preservation, survey projects, zoning, and extension programs. Includes records pertaining to Nolen's studies at the University of Pennsylvania and Harvard; his work at the American Society for the Extension of University Teaching; consulting jobs; projects with the United States Housing Corporation, National Resources Committee, National Park Service, National Resources Planning Board, Federal Emergency Relief Administration of Public Works, Resettlement Administration, Department of the Interior, Division of Subsistence Homesteads, and various city and state agencies; and housing, parks, streets, railways, and water systems in Bridgeport, Conn., Charlotte, N.C., Clearwater, Clewiston, Sarasota, and Venice, Fla., Columbus, Ga., Johnson City and Kingsport, Tenn., La Crosse and Madison, Wis., Lancaster and Reading, Pa., Little Rock, Ark., Mariemont, Ohio, Niagara Falls, N.Y., Riverton, N.J., Roanoke, Va., Sacramento and San Diego, Calif., Boston, Mass., Spartanburg, S.C., Dubuque, Iowa; and other places. Also, "The Nolen Family Album: A Record of Five Generations 1835-1954," family history, compiled by John Nolen, Jr. and Barbara Nolen Strong, 1980.
- Nolen, John, Hale J. Walker, and Justin R. Hartzog. Comprehensive City Plan, Roanoke, Virginia. 1928. [Roanoke. Va.]: [Printed by the Stone Print. and Manufacturing Co.], 1929.
- Nolen, John. Replanning Small Cities; Six Typical Studies. New York: B.W. Huebsch, 1912. Contents: Replanning small cities: a general survey.--Roanoke (Virginia): a small city of the new South.--San Diego (California): a Pacific coast resort and future seaport.--Montclair (New Jersey): a residence town suburban to New York.--Glen Ridge: a model borough in New Jersey.--Reading (Pennsylvania): a small industrial city.--Madison (Wisconsin): a state capital and university town.--Existing cities: how they can be replanned.
- Woman's Civic Betterment Club (Roanoke, Va.). Festival Facts and Fancies: All for Roanoke. Roanoke, Va: Woman's Civic Betterment Club, 1907. "Views of Prominent Citizens for Roanoke's Betterment."
- Woman's Civic Betterment Club (Roanoke, Va.), and Birdie K. Stone. The Roanoke Cook Book, Favorite Recipes by Some of Roanoke's Good Housekeepers. 1907. Published by the Woman's civic betterment club. Compiled by Mrs. Albert A. Stone. 164 pages.
- Woman's Civic Betterment Club of Roanoke, The Year Book of the Woman's Civic

Betterment Club / Roanoke, Virginia 1910 (Roanoke: Hammond Printing Works, 1910), 5, in WCBC file, Virginia Room, Roanoke County Public Library.
