= Acer campestre 'Commodore' =

Maple cultivar

Acer campestre
- Cultivar: 'Commodore'
- Origin: Unknown

The Field Maple Acer campestre cultivar 'Commodore' is of obscure origin.

== Description ==
'Commodore' is a medium-size tree with clear yellow foliage, occasionally flushed red, in autumn.

== Cultivation ==
As with the species, the cultivar thrives best in a semi shade position, on a fertile, well-drained soil.

== Accessions ==
None known.
