= Sipha elegans =

Scientific classification
- Kingdom: Animalia
- Phylum: Arthropoda
- Class: Insecta
- Order: Hemiptera
- Suborder: Sternorrhyncha
- Family: Aphididae
- Genus: Sipha
- Species: S. elegans

Binomial name
- Sipha elegans Del Guercio, 1905

Species of aphid

Sipha elegans is a species of aphid. It is a pest of millets.
