= Willie Walker Caldwell =

American novelist

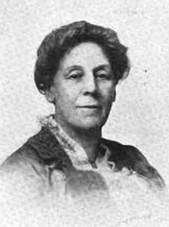
- Born: Willie Walker; 1860; Newbern, Virginia
- Died: 1946 (aged 85–86)
- Occupations: Writer, Clubwoman
- Spouse: Manley M. Caldwell (m. 1895)

Willie Walker Caldwell (1860–1946) was an American writer and club woman.

== Biography ==
Caldwell née Walker was born in Newbern, Virginia in 1860. In 1895 she married Manley M. Caldwell with whom she had three children.

For five years Walker edited a column for The Roanoke Times. She was the author of several books including a biography of her father Stonewall Jim: A Biography of General James A. Walker, C.S.A., and the historical novels The Tie that Binds: a story of the North and the South and Donald McElroy, Scotch Irishman.

She was charter member of the Roanoke Woman's Civic Betterment Club and served as president for 4 years. She was also a member of the Virginia Federation of Women's Clubs, serving as president for a number of years. Other memberships included the Daughters of the American Revolution and the United Daughters of the Confederacy.

She was quoted in an editorial in August, 1914 edition of The American Club Woman Magazine, stating "The best work of women's clubs is done in the awakening of the civic conscious."

Caldwell died in 1946. In 2018 the Virginia Capitol Foundation announced that Caldwell's name would be on the Virginia Women's Monument's glass Wall of Honor.
