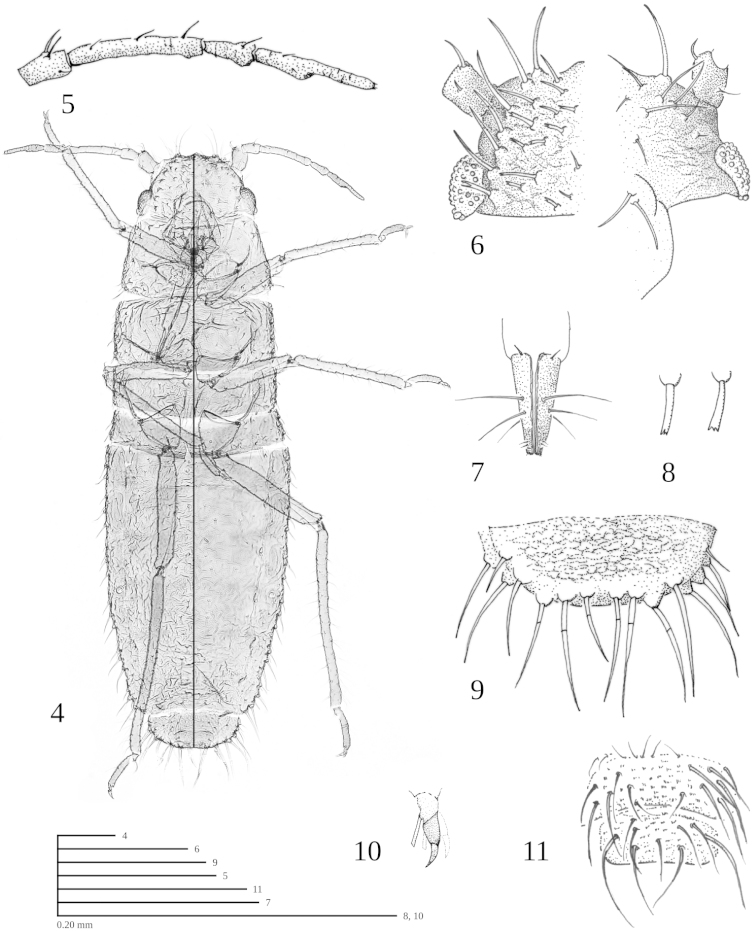

Scientific classification
- Domain: Eukaryota
- Kingdom: Animalia
- Phylum: Arthropoda
- Class: Insecta
- Order: Hemiptera
- Suborder: Sternorrhyncha
- Family: Aphididae
- Genus: Atheroides; Haliday, 1839

= Atheroides =

Genus of true bugs

Atheroides is a genus of true bugs belonging to the family Aphididae.

The species of this genus are found in Europe and North America.

Species:

- Atheroides brevicornis Laing, 1920
- Atheroides doncasteri Ossiannilsson, 1955
