= Sipha =

Scientific classification
- Domain: Eukaryota
- Kingdom: Animalia
- Phylum: Arthropoda
- Class: Insecta
- Order: Hemiptera
- Suborder: Sternorrhyncha
- Family: Aphididae
- Genus: Sipha; Passerini, 1860

Genus of true bugs

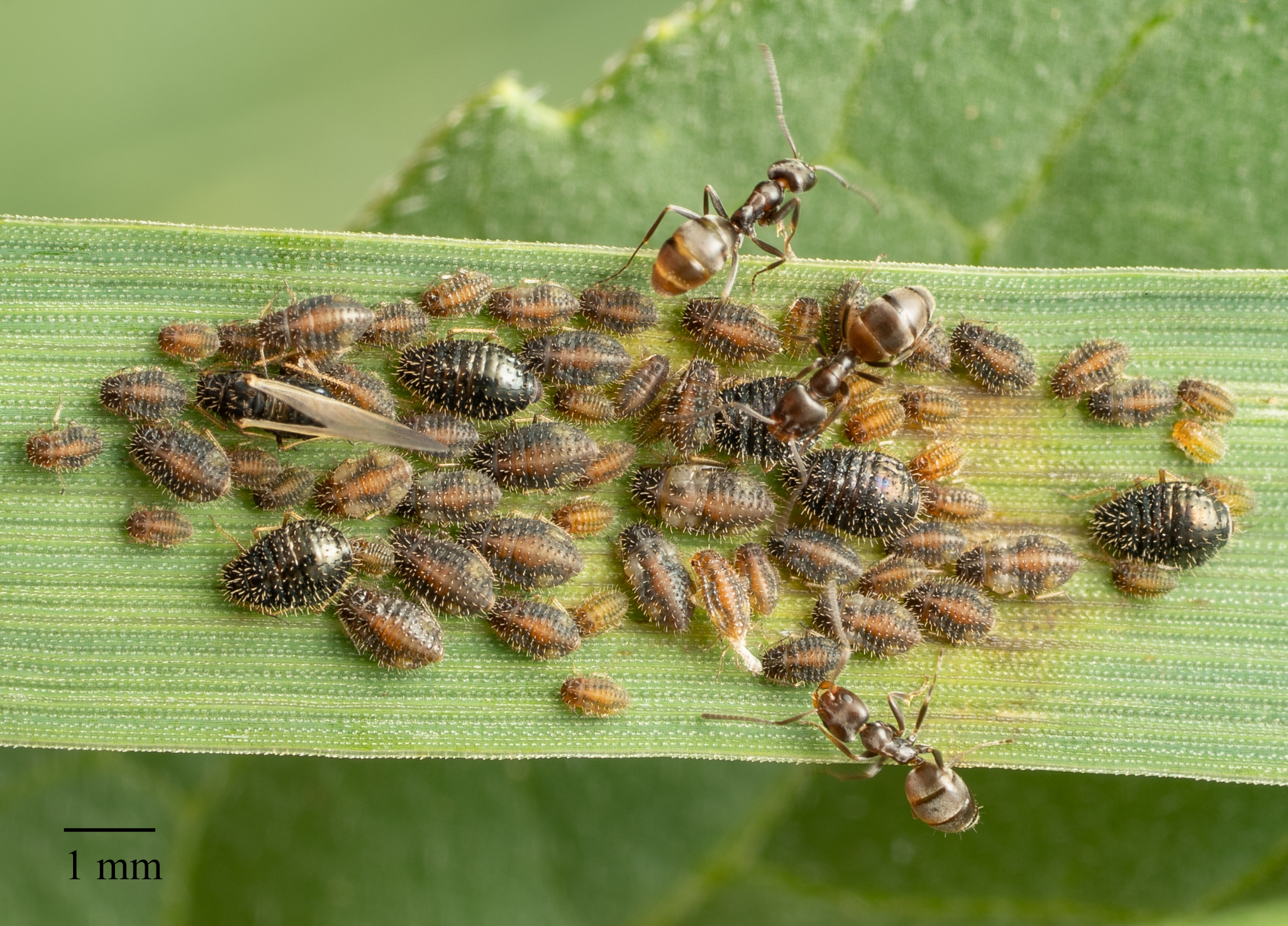

Sipha is a genus of true bugs belonging to the family Aphididae.

The genus has almost cosmopolitan distribution.

Species:

- Sipha aegilopis Bozhko, 1961
- Sipha agropyronensis (Gillette, 1911)
- Sipha elegans
- Sipha flava
- Sipha maydis
