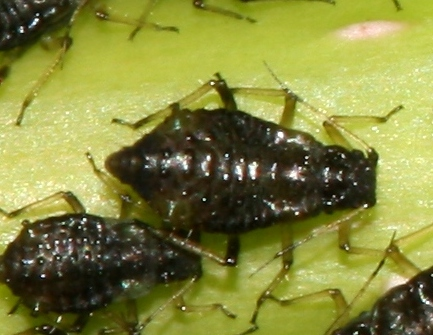

Scientific classification
- Domain: Eukaryota
- Kingdom: Animalia
- Phylum: Arthropoda
- Class: Insecta
- Order: Hemiptera
- Suborder: Sternorrhyncha
- Family: Aphididae
- Subfamily: Chaitophorinae
- Genus: Periphyllus; Hoeven, 1863

= Periphyllus =

Genus of true bugs

Periphyllus is a genus of maple aphids in the family Aphididae. There are more than 40 described species in Periphyllus.

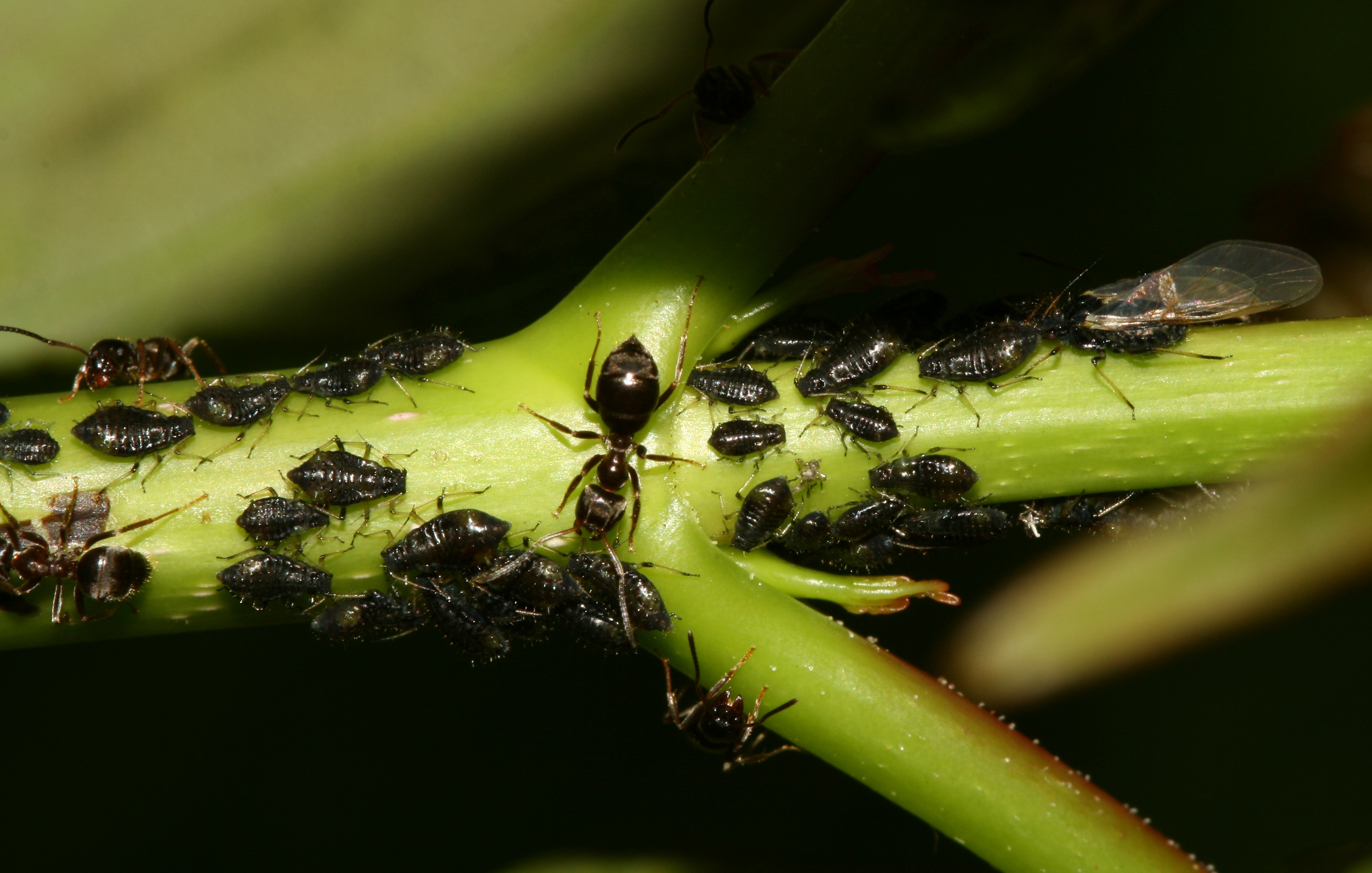
Maple aphids, Periphyllus

== Species ==
These 48 species belong to the genus Periphyllus:

- Periphyllus acericola (Walker, 1848)
- Periphyllus acerifoliae
- Periphyllus acerihabitans Zhang, 1982
- Periphyllus aceriphaga Chakrabarti & Mandal, 1987
- Periphyllus aceris (Linnaeus, 1761)
- Periphyllus aesculi Hille Ris Lambers, 1933
- Periphyllus allogenes
- Periphyllus americanus (Baker, 1917)
- Periphyllus bengalensis Ghosh & Raychaudhuri, 1972
- Periphyllus brevisetosus Sorin, 1990
- Periphyllus brevispinosus Gillette & Palmer, 1930
- Periphyllus bulgaricus Tashev, 1964
- Periphyllus caesium Chakrabarti & Saha, 1987
- Periphyllus californiensis (Shinji, 1917)
- Periphyllus changlai Remaudière, 2002
- Periphyllus coleoptis
- Periphyllus coracinus (Koch, 1854)
- Periphyllus diacerivorus Zhang, 1982
- Periphyllus formosanus Takahashi, 1921
- Periphyllus garhwalensis Chakrabarti & Mandal, 1987
- Periphyllus himalayensis
- Periphyllus hirticornis (Walker, 1848)
- Periphyllus hokkaidensis Sorin, 1990
- Periphyllus karatavicus Kadyrbekov, 1999
- Periphyllus koelreuteriae (Takahashi, 1919)
- Periphyllus kuwanaii (Takahashi, 1919)
- Periphyllus loricatus Pashtshenko, 1987
- Periphyllus lyropictus (Kessler, 1886) (Norway maple aphid)
- Periphyllus mamontovae Narzikulov, 1957
- Periphyllus mandshuricus
- Periphyllus minutus Shaposhnikov, 1952
- Periphyllus negundinis (Thomas, 1878) (boxelder aphid)
- Periphyllus nevskyii
- Periphyllus obscurus Mamontova, 1955
- Periphyllus pakistanicus Remaudière, 2002
- Periphyllus pallidus Chakrabarti & Saha, 1987
- Periphyllus rhenanus (Börner, 1940)
- Periphyllus singeri (Börner, 1952)
- Periphyllus steveni Mamontova-Solukha, 1962
- Periphyllus tegmentosus
- Periphyllus testudinaceus (Fernie, 1852) (common maple aphid)
- Periphyllus tokyoensis Sorin, 1990
- Periphyllus triflorumi
- Periphyllus unmoonsanensis
- Periphyllus vandenboschi Hille Ris Lambers, 1966
- Periphyllus venetianus Hille Ris Lambers, 1967
- Periphyllus villosii Chakrabarti, 1977
- Periphyllus viridis (Matsumura, 1919)
