= Acer campestre 'William Caldwell' =

Maple cultivar

Acer campestre 'William Caldwell' A.G.M.
- Species: Acer campestre
- Cultivar: 'William Caldwell'
- Origin: Caldwell 9& Sons Limited.The Nurseries. Knutsford. Cheshire. England

The Field Maple cultivar Acer campestre 'William Caldwell' was cloned from a seedling discovered at Caldwell's Ollerton Nursery near Knutsford, England, on 16 September 1976 by Donovan Caldwell Leaman, Director of the Caldwell's Nurseries that closed on 31 January 1992, after 212 years in Knutsford. The tree was released to commerce in 1986 R.H.S. Award of Garden Merit. (AGM) November 2022, forty-nine years after the seed was sown.

== Description ==
The tree is noted for its fastigiate shape, and foliage which turns orange or red in autumn where planted on acid soils, not yellow as with the species.

== Cultivation ==
'William Caldwell' is now listed in several Dutch Nurseries. The tree is also to be found in France, Germany, the Czech Republic, Hungary and Poland. The "BILL" Maple was introduced in 2012 to the United States by the United States Department of Agriculture to their National Arboretum in Washington DC. Having cleared the Quarantine Laboratory, the Caldwell Maple is now being grown by Schmidts' Nurseries in Oregon where its remarkable clean growth when compared to their other Field Maples is cause for celebration. Schmidts expect to put the cultivar into the U.S. nursery trade in 2025

== Etymology ==
The cultivar is named for William Caldwell, the VIth (1922 -2001). The cultivar was originally known as 'King Canute' until 1983 when Donovan Caldwell Leaman changed the name in honour of his cousin and business partner Bill; King Canute seated on his throne was the emblem and trademark of Caldwell & Sons Ltd Nurseries, Knutsford. The National Tree Register of Britain and Ireland now have Acer campestre 'William Caldwell' on their list of Champion Trees with several specimens over 40 feet. The Height Champion Tree, planted in Winter 1987/88 atop Alderley Edge, Cheshire was measured in December 2019 as 16.3 metres (52 feet, 11 inches) Fittingly, the Girth Champion Tree, one of the original layers, was planted in Knutsford. Measured in December 2019, it had a Girth of 1.26 metres, (with a Height of 12.6 metres)

== Accessions ==
=== Europe ===
- Royal Horticultural Society Gardens, Wisley, Surrey, UK. Accession. In January 1986, 1four-year old layer from the 'mother tree' was supplied by Caldwells Nurseries of Knutsford. Destroyed in the Great Gale of October 1987, Caldwells replaced it with a grafted tree in January 1990, which, when measured in November 2015 was over 10 metres high.

=== North America ===
- National Arboretum, Washington, D. C., US. Acquired 2012, other details not known.
