= Phalaris phleoides =

Phalaris phleoides can refer to the following grass species:

- Phalaris phleoides Steud., a synonym of Phleum arenarium L.
- Phalaris phleoides L., a synonym of Phleum phleoides (L.) H.Karst.
