= Deadman's Grave, Icklingham =

Protected area in Suffolk, England

Coordinates: 52.34°N 0.61°E

- Site of Special Scientific Interest
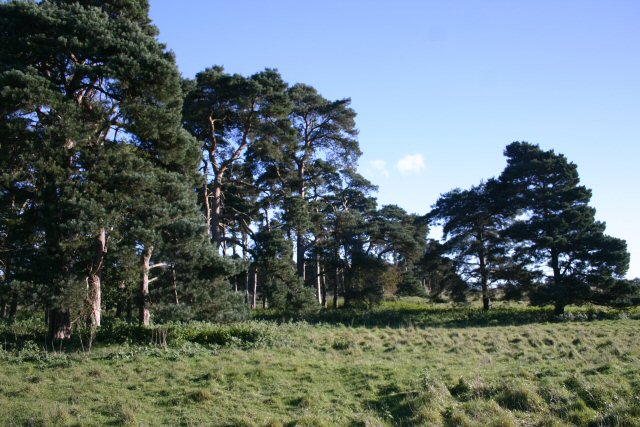
- General Stracey's Covert
- Location of Deadman's Grave, Icklingham.
- Area of search: Suffolk
- Grid reference: TL 779 742
- Interest: Biological
- Area: 127.3 hectares
- Notification date: 1983
- Location map: Magic Map

Deadman's Grave, Icklingham is a 127.3-hectare (315-acre) biological Site of Special Scientific Interest north-east of Icklingham in Suffolk. It is a Nature Conservation Review site, Grade I, and part of Breckland Special Area of Conservation and Breckland Special Protection Area under the European Union Directive on the Conservation of Wild Birds.

According to Natural England, this site "is largely covered by short, sheep-grazed, species-rich calcareous grassland of the very highest value." It has four nationally rare plants, Spanish catchfly, Boehmer's cat's-tail, Breckland Wild Thyme and spring speedwell. Nationally rare stone curlews breed there.

A track called Seven Tree Road runs through the site.
