= Poa arenaria =

Poa arenaria can refer to the following grass species:

- Poa arenaria (L.) Willd. ex Spreng., a synonym of Phleum arenarium L.
- Poa arenaria Retz., a synonym of Puccinellia maritima (Huds.) Parl.
