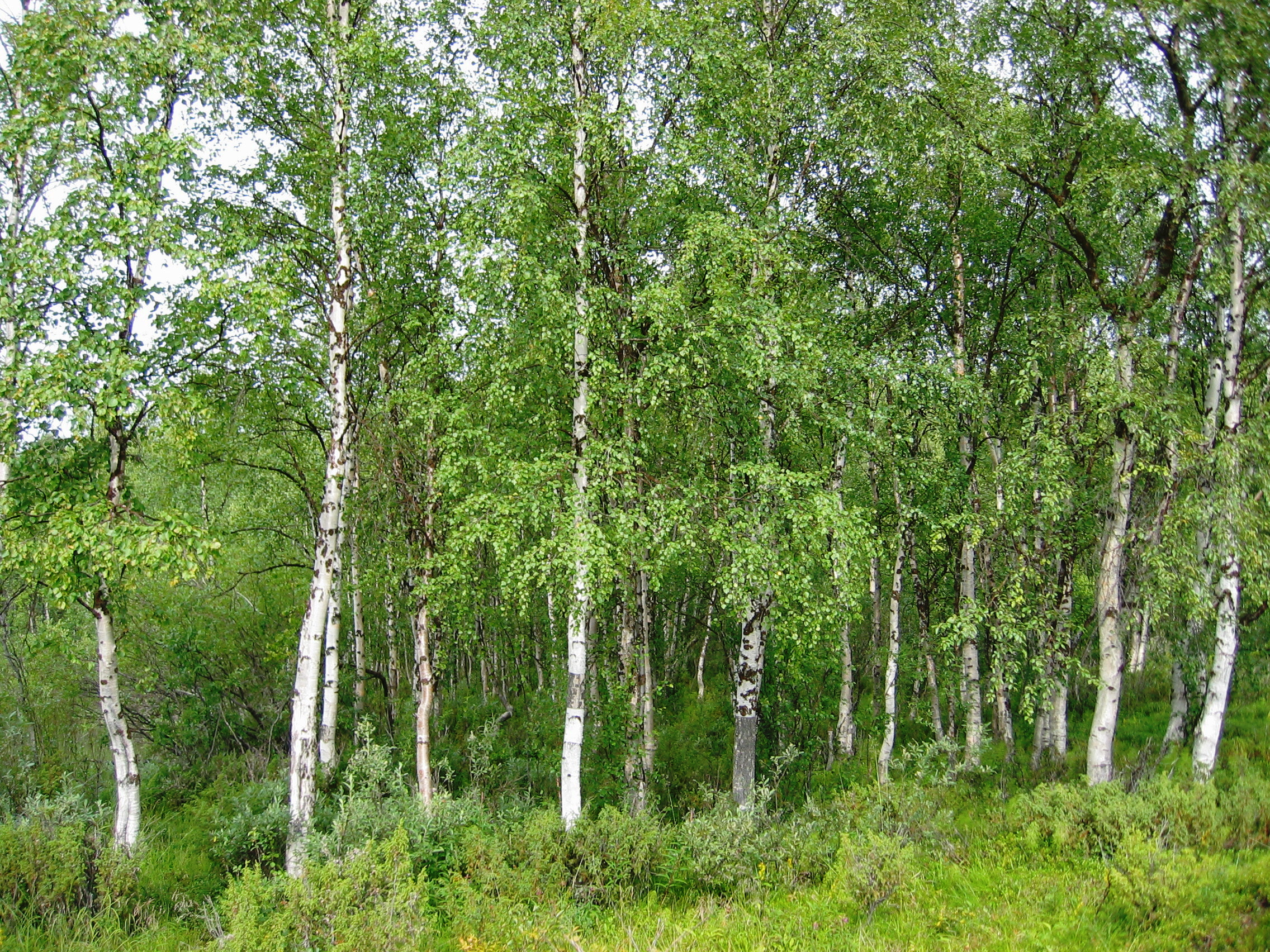
- Silver birch forest, Inari, Finland

Conservation status
- Least Concern (IUCN 3.1)

Scientific classification
- Kingdom: Plantae
- Clade: Tracheophytes
- Clade: Angiosperms
- Clade: Eudicots
- Clade: Rosids
- Order: Fagales
- Family: Betulaceae
- Genus: Betula
- Subgenus: Betula subg. Betula
- Species: B. pendula

Binomial name
- Betula pendula Roth

Subspecies
- Betula pendula subsp. mandshurica (Regel) Ashburner & McAll.; Betula pendula subsp. pendula; Betula pendula subsp. szechuanica (C.K.Schneid.) Ashburner & McAll.
- Distribution map

Synonyms
- Synonymy: Betula alba var. pendula (Roth) St.-Lag.; Betula alba lusus pendula (Roth) Regel; Betula alba var. pendula (Roth) W.T.Aiton synonyms of subsp. mandschurica: Betula ajanensis Kom.; Betula alaskana Sarg. (1901), non Lesq. (1882), fossil name.; Betula alba var. humilis Regel; Betula alba var. japonica Miq.; Betula alba var. kamtschatica Regel; Betula alba subsp. mandshurica Regel; Betula alba var. mandshurica (Regel) Franch.; Betula alba var. resinifera Regel; Betula alba var. tauschii Regel; Betula austrosichotensis V.N.Vassil. & V.I.Baranov; Betula cajanderi Sukaczev; Betula cajanderi subsp. minutifolia Kozhevn.; Betula demetrii I.V.Vassil.; Betula grandifolia Litv. (1905), non Ettingsh. (1866), fossil name.; Betula japonica (Miq.) Siebold ex H.J.P.Winkl., nom. illeg. homonym. post.; Betula japonica var. kamtschatica (Regel) H.J.P.Winkl.; Betula japonica var. mandshurica (Regel) H.J.P.Winkl.; Betula japonica var. pluricostata H.J.P.Winkl.; Betula japonica var. resinifera (Regel) H.J.P.Winkl.; Betula japonica var. sachalinensis Koidz.; Betula japonica var. tauschii (Regel) H.J.P.Winkl.; Betula kamtschatica (Regel) C.-A.Jansson, nom. illeg. homonym. post.; Betula kenaica var. japonica (Miq.) Lindq.; Betula latifolia var. cuneifolia Nakai; Betula latifolia var. kamtschatica (Regel) Makino & Nemoto; Betula latifolia var. mandshurica (Regel) Nakai; Betula latifolia var. pluricostata (H.J.P.Winkl.) Makino & Nemoto; Betula mandshurica (Regel) Nakai; Betula mandshurica var. japonica (Miq.) Rehder; Betula mandshurica var. kamtschatica (Regel) Rehder; Betula neoalaskana Sarg.; Betula papyrifera subsp. humilis (Regel) A.E.Murray; Betula papyrifera var. humilis (Regel) Fernald & Raup; Betula papyrifera subsp. neoalaskana (Sarg.) A.E.Murray; Betula papyrifera var. neoalaskana (Sarg.) Raup; Betula pendula var. japonica (Miq.) Rehder; Betula pendula subsp. kamtschatica (Regel) Shemberg; Betula pendula f. microdonta C.K.Schneid.; Betula pendula var. tauschii (Regel) Rehder; Betula platyphylla Sukaczev; Betula platyphylla var. brunnea J.X.Huang; Betula platyphylla var. cuneifolia (Nakai) H.Hara; Betula platyphylla var. japonica (Miq.) H.Hara; Betula platyphylla subsp. kamtschatica (Regel) Vorosch.; Betula platyphylla var. kamtschatica (Regel) H.Hara; Betula platyphylla f. laciniata (Miyabe & Tatew.) H.Hara; Betula platyphylla var. mandshurica (Regel) H.Hara; Betula platyphylla subsp. mandshurica (Regel) Kitag.; Betula platyphylla subsp. minutifolia (Kozhevn.) Kozhevn.; Betula platyphylla var. phellodendroides S.L.Tung; Betula platyphylla var. pluricostata (H.J.P.Winkl.) Tatew.; Betula platyphylla var. tauschii (Regel) Tatew.; Betula resinifera Britton, nom. illeg. homonym. post.; Betula tauschii (Regel) Koidz.; Betula tauschii var. cuneifolia (Nakai) Nemoto; Betula tauschii var. kamtschatica (Regel) Koidz.; Betula tauschii f. laciniata Miyabe & Tatew.; Betula tauschii var. pluricostata (H.J.P.Winkl.) Koidz.; Betula verrucosa var. japonica (Miq.) A.Henry; Betula verrucosa var. platyphylla (Sukaczev) Lindq. synonyms of subsp. pendula: Betula aetnensis Raf. ex J.Presl & C.Presl, orth. var.; Betula alba var. aetherea Wallr.; Betula alba var. arborescens Wallr.; Betula alba var. arbuscula Fr.; Betula alba var. atropurpurea Dippel; Betula alba f. aurea Schur; Betula alba var. bircalensis (Mela) Mela; Betula alba var. carelica Merckl.; Betula alba f. dalecarlica (L.f.) Regel; Betula alba var. dalecarlica L.f.; Betula alba lusus expansa Regel; Betula alba var. fastigiata Clemenc.; Betula alba foliis-atropurpureis Van Geert, not validly publ.; Betula alba var. fontqueri (Rothm.) Maire & Weiller; Betula alba var. globosa Gray; Betula alba var. laciniata Hartm.; Betula alba laciniata (Hartm.) de Vos; Betula alba f. laciniata (Hartm.) Dippel; Betula alba f. lobata Regel; Betula alba var. lobulata C.Andersson; Betula alba var. macrocarpa Willd.; Betula alba lusus microphylla (Hartm.) Regel; Betula alba var. microphylla Hartm.; Betula alba var. oycowiensis (Besser) Regel; Betula alba pendula-youngii T.Moore; Betula alba var. purpurea W.Paul; Betula alba var. saxatilis Lilj.; Betula alba f. transsylvanica Schur; Betula alba subsp. verrucosa (Ehrh.) Regel; Betula alba f. verrucosa (Ehrh.) Schur; Betula alba var. verrucosa (Ehrh.) Mérat; Betula alba var. vulgaris Spach, nom. illeg.; Betula alba f. vulgaris Regel; Betula brachylepis V.N.Vassil.; Betula cajanderi f. fruticans Kozhevn.; Betula carpatica var. sudetica Rchb.; Betula coriacea Pamp.; Betula cycoviensis Steud.; Betula ellipticifolia V.N.Vassil.; Betula etnensis Raf.; Betula ferganensis V.N.Vassil.; Betula fontqueri Rothm.; Betula fontqueri subsp. parvibracteata (Peinado, G.Moreno & A.Velasco) Rivas Mart. & Ladero; Betula grandifolia var. pubescens Kuzen.; Betula gummifera Bertol.; Betula hippolyti Sukaczev; Betula hybrida Blom; Betula insularis V.N.Vassil.; Betula kossogolica V.N.Vassil.; Betula kotulae Zaver.; Betula laciniata (Hartm.) Rchb., nom. illeg. homonym. post.; Betula laciniata var. crispa Rchb.; Betula lobulata Kit.; Betula ludmilae V.N.Vassil.; Betula microlepis I.V.Vassil.; Betula microlepis var. moldavica Osadchii; Betula mongolica V.N.Vassil.; Betula montana V.N.Vassil.; Betula obscura Kotula ex Fiek; Betula odorata var. sudetica (Rchb.) P.D.Sell; Betula oxycoviensis Besser; Betula oxycoviensis var. majuscula Kindb.; Betula oycowiensis Besser; Betula oycowiensis var. majuscula Kindb.; Betula palmata Borkh.; Betula palmata var. bircalensis (Mela) Tzvelev; Betula palmata var. crispa (Rchb.) Tzvelev; Betula palmata var. lobulata (C.Andersson) Tzvelev; Betula parvibracteata Peinado, G.Moreno & A.Velasco; Betula pendula f. bircalensis (Mela) Hämet-Ahti; Betula pendula var. carelica (Merckl.) Hämet-Ahti; Betula pendula f. crispa (Rchb.) Hämet-Ahti; Betula pendula f. cuneata C.K.Schneid.; Betula pendula var. cuneata (C.K.Schneid.) P.D.Sell; Betula pendula f. dalecarlica (L.f.) Dippel; Betula pendula var. dalecarlica (L.f.) L.H.Bailey; Betula pendula f. elegans Dippel; Betula pendula var. etnensis (Raf.) P.D.Sell; Betula pendula subsp. etnensis (Raf.) Zangh.; Betula pendula f. fastigiata (Clemenc.) Rehder; Betula pendula var. fontqueri (Rothm.) G.Moreno & Peinado; Betula pendula subsp. fontqueri (Rothm.) G.Moreno & Peinado; Betula pendula f. gracilis (Rehder) Rehder; Betula pendula var. gracilis Rehder; Betula pendula var. laciniata (Hartm.) Tidestr.; Betula pendula var. lapponica (Lindq.) Hämet-Ahti; Betula pendula var. meridionalis G.Moreno & Peinado; Betula pendula var. microlepis (I.V.Vassil.) Doluch.; Betula pendula var. obscura (Kotula ex Fiek) Olšavská; Betula pendula f. oycowiensis (Besser) Dippel; Betula pendula var. oycowiensis (Besser) C.K.Schneid.; Betula pendula f. palmeri Hämet-Ahti; Betula pendula var. parvibracteata (Peinado, G.Moreno & A.Velasco) G.Moreno & Peinado; Betula pendula f. pyramidalis Dippel; Betula pendula f. tristis C.K.Schneid.; Betula pendula var. tristis (C.K.Schneid.) Rehder; Betula pendula f. viscosa (Bean) Rehder; Betula pendula f. youngii C.K.Schneid.; Betula pinnata var. hybrida Lundmark; Betula platyphylloides V.N.Vassil.; Betula platyphylloides var. microphylla Osadchii; Betula pseudopendula V.N.Vassil.; Betula pubescens var. verrucosa (Ehrh.) Rchb.; Betula purpurea (W.Paul) H.J.Veitch; Betula szaferi Jent.-Szaf. ex Staszk.; Betula talassica Poljakov; Betula tiulinae V.N.Vassil.; Betula transbaicalensis V.N.Vassil.; Betula transsylvanica (Schur) Schur; Betula tristis Dippel, pro syn.; Betula uschkanensis Sukaczev, nom. nud.; Betula verrucosa Ehrh.; Betula verrucosa subsp. ambigua Hampe ex Kindb.; Betula verrucosa var. arbuscula (Fr.) H.J.P.Winkl.; Betula verrucosa f. bircalensis Mela; Betula verrucosa subsp. borealis Kindb.; Betula verrucosa f. dalecarlica (L.f.) H.J.P.Winkl.; Betula verrucosa var. dalecarlica (L.f.) Nyman; Betula verrucosa var. elegans (Dippel) Schelle; Betula verrucosa f. elegans (Dippel) H.J.P.Winkl.; Betula verrucosa var. elegans-laciniata Adamov; Betula verrucosa f. expansa Regel; Betula verrucosa subsp. fallax Kindb.; Betula verrucosa f. fastigiata K.Koch; Betula verrucosa var. frutescens Kindb.; Betula verrucosa var. hybrida (Blom) Nyman, nom. superfl.; Betula verrucosa var. incisa Brenner; Betula verrucosa var. laciniata Kindb.; Betula verrucosa var. lapponica Lindq.; Betula verrucosa f. lobata (Regel) Anders ex H.J.P.Winkl.; Betula verrucosa var. lobulata (Kit.) Nyman; Betula verrucosa var. microphylla (Hartm.) Fiek; Betula verrucosa subsp. obscura (Kotula ex Fiek) Á.Löve & D.Löve; Betula verrucosa var. obscura (Kotula ex Fiek) Gürke; Betula verrucosa var. odorata Nyman; Betula verrucosa subsp. oycowiensis (Besser) Nyman; Betula verrucosa var. oycowiensis (Besser) H.J.P.Winkl.; Betula verrucosa subsp. platycarpa Kindb.; Betula verrucosa var. pyramidalis Adamov; Betula verrucosa var. saxatilis Lindq.; Betula verrucosa lusus tristis (C.K.Schneid.) Asch. & Graebn.; Betula verrucosa f. viscosa Bean; Betula verrucosa var. vulgaris H.J.P.Winkl., nom. illeg. homonym. post.; Betula verrusosa f. serrata Mörner; Betula virgultosa Fr. ex Regel; Betula vladimirii V.N.Vassil.; synonyms of subsp. szechuanica: Betula japonica var. rockii Rehder; Betula japonica var. szechuanica C.K.Schneid.; Betula mandshurica var. rockii (Rehder) Rehder; Betula mandshurica var. szechuanica (C.K.Schneid.) Rehder; Betula platyphylla var. rockii (Rehder) Rehder; Betula platyphylla var. szechuanica (C.K.Schneid.) Rehder; Betula rockii (Rehder) C.-A.Jansson; Betula szechuanica (C.K.Schneid.) C.-A.Jansson

= Betula pendula =

Silver birch Betula pendula

Species of birch

Betula pendula, the silver birch, is a species of tree in the flowering plant family, Betulaceae. The trees can reach a height of 30 m, and have white bark that sheds regularly. It is native to Europe, Morocco, temperate Asia, Canada, and Alaska, although in southern Europe and Morocco it is only found at higher elevations. Its range extends into Siberia, China, and southwest Asia in the mountains of northern Turkey, the Caucasus, and northern Iran.

It has also been called warty birch from the warty twigs, and (particularly for selected strongly pendulous cultivars) weeping birch; in Korea it has been cited as East Asian white birch, though this can also refer to Betula platyphylla. It has been introduced into North America, where it is sometimes known as European white birch, and is considered invasive in some states in the United States and parts of Canada.

The silver birch is a medium-sized deciduous tree that owes its common name to the white peeling bark on the trunk. The twigs are slender and often pendulous and the leaves are roughly triangular with doubly serrate margins and turn yellow and brown in autumn before they fall. The flowers are catkins and the light, winged seeds get widely scattered by the wind. The silver birch is a hardy tree, a pioneer species, and one of the first trees to appear on bare or fire-swept land. Many species of birds and animals are found in birch woodland, the tree supports a wide range of insects and the light shade it casts allows shrubby and other plants to grow beneath its canopy. It is planted as a decorative tree in parks and gardens, and is used for forest products such as joinery timber, plywood, firewood, tanning, racecourse jumps, and brooms. Various parts of the tree are used in traditional medicine and the bark contains triterpenes, which have been shown to have medicinal properties.

== Description ==
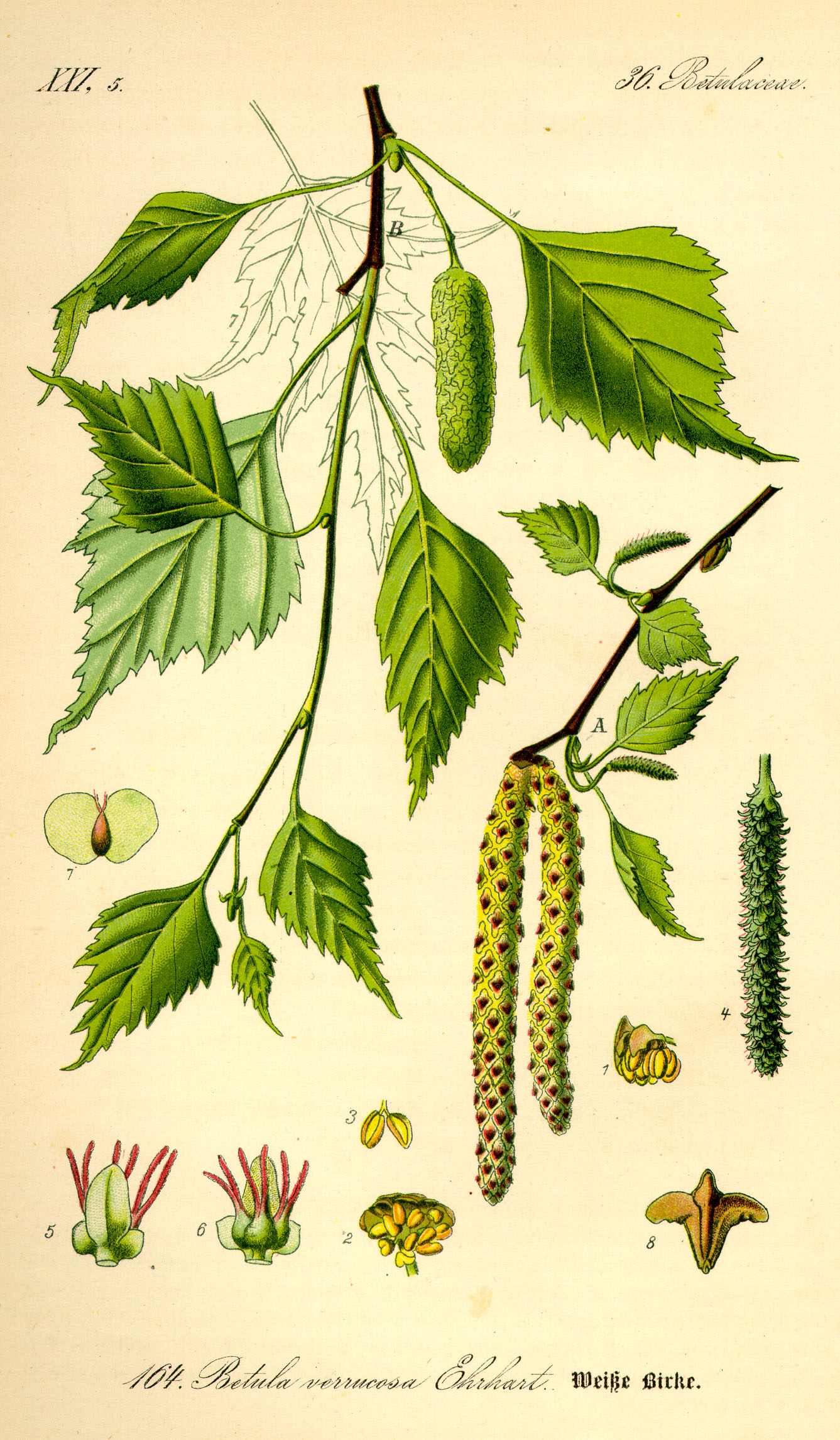
Silver birch

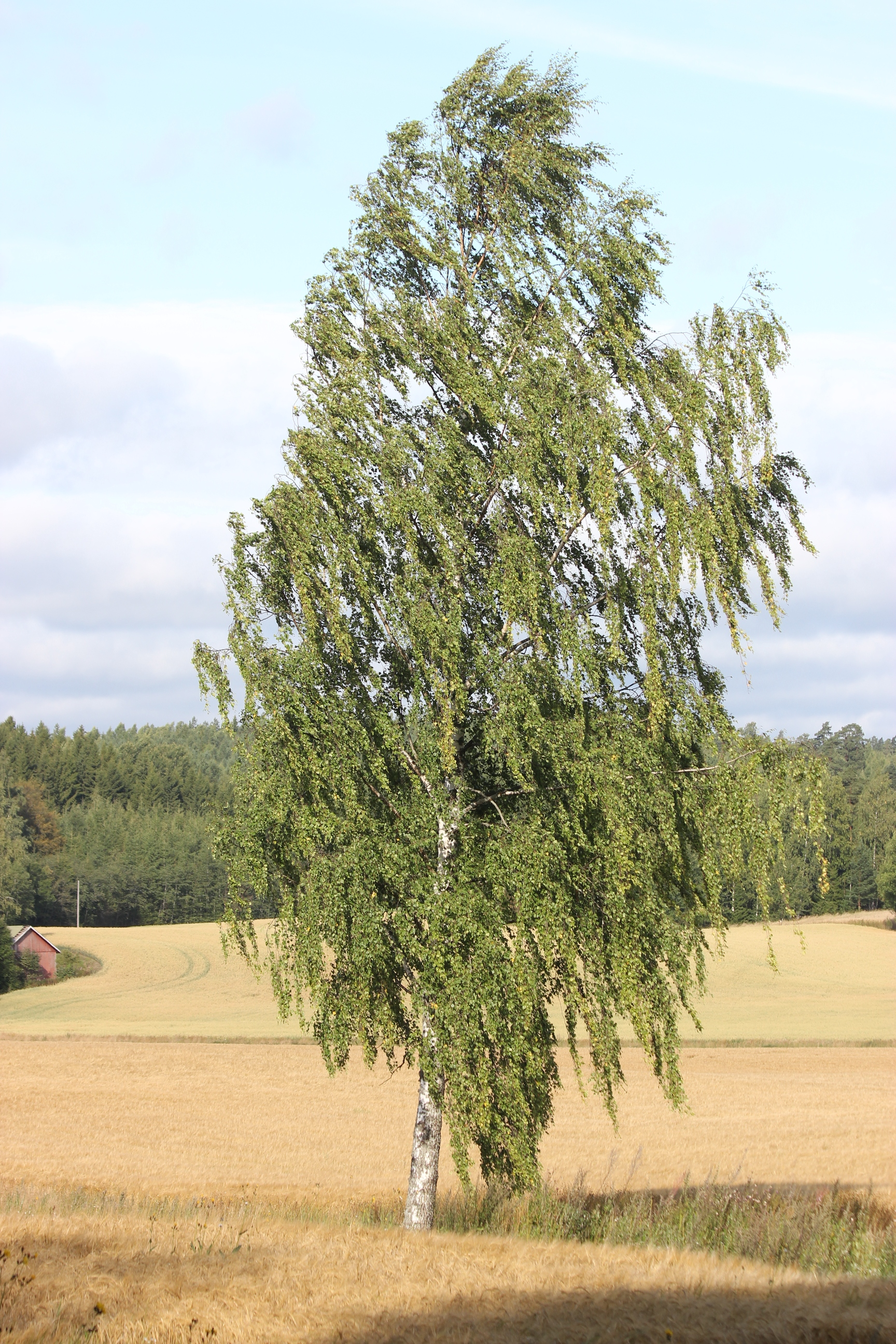
Silver birch has often pendulous twigs, after which the tree has received its scientific name.

The silver birch typically reaches 15 to 25 m (49 to 82 ft) tall, exceptionally up to 31 m (102 ft), with a slender trunk usually under 40 cm (1 ft 4 in) in diameter. The bark on the trunk and branches is golden-brown at first, but later this turns to white as a result of papery tissue developing on the surface and peeling off in flakes, in a similar manner to the closely related paper birch (B. papyrifera). The bark remains smooth until the tree gets quite large, but in older trees, the bark thickens, becoming irregular, dark, and rugged. Young branches have whitish resin warts and the twigs are slender, hairless, and often pendulous. The buds are small and sticky, and development is sympodial – the terminal bud dies away and growth continues from a lateral bud. The species is monoecious with male and female catkins found on the same tree. Some shoots are long and bear the male catkins at the tip, while others are short and bear female catkins. The immature male catkins are present during the winter, but the female catkins develop in the spring, soon after the leaves unfurl.

The leaves have short, slender stalks and are 3 to 7 cm (1 1/8 to 2 3/4 in) long, triangular with broad, untoothed, wedge-shaped bases, slender pointed tips, and coarsely double-toothed, serrated margins. They are sticky with resin at first, but this dries as they age, leaving small, white scales. The foliage is a pale to medium green and turns yellow early in the autumn before the leaves fall. In midsummer, the female catkins mature and the male catkins expand and release pollen, and wind pollination takes place. A catkin of Silver birch could produce an average of 1.66 million pollen grains. The small, 1- to 2-mm winged seeds ripen in late summer on pendulous, cylindrical catkins 2 to 4 cm (3/4 to 1 5/8 in) long and 7 mm (1/4 in) broad. The seeds are very numerous and are separated by scales, and when ripe, the whole catkin disintegrates and the seeds are spread widely by the wind.

Silver birch can easily be confused with the similar downy birch (Betula pubescens). Yet, downy birches are characterised by hairy leaves and young shoots, whereas the same parts on silver birch are hairless. The leaf base of silver birch is usually a right angle to the stalk, while for downy birches, it is rounded. In terms of genetic structure, the trees are quite different, but do, however, occasionally hybridise.

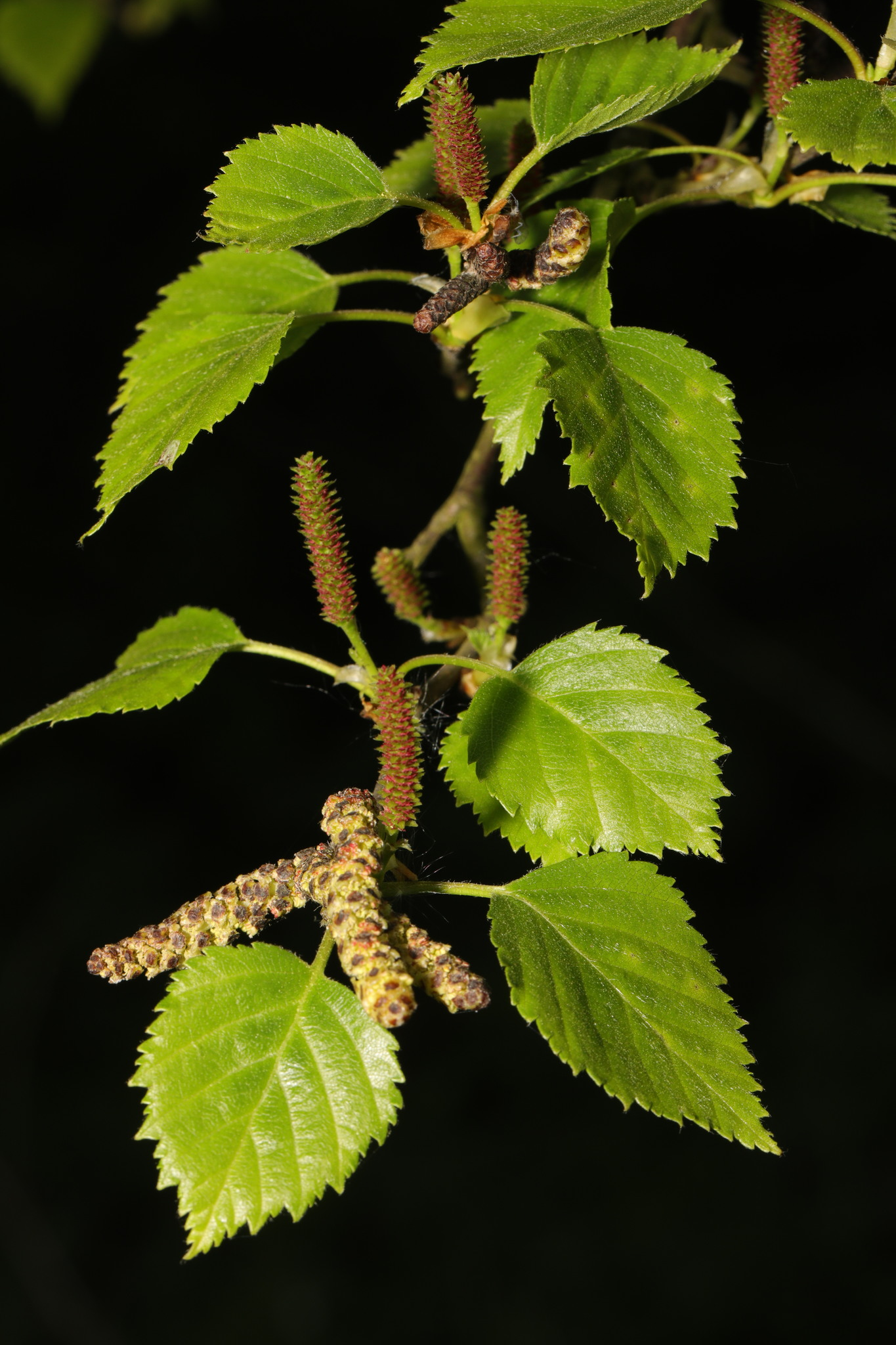
Betula pendula silver birch catkins and leaves, Childwall Woods & Fields, Merseyside

== Distribution and habitat ==
The silver birch grows naturally from western Europe eastwards to Kazakhstan, the Sakha Republic in Siberia, Mongolia, and the Xinjiang province in China, and southwards to the mountains of the Caucasus and northern Iran, Iraq, and Turkey. It is also native to northern Morocco and has become naturalised in some other parts of the world. In the southern parts of its range, it is mainly found in mountainous regions. Its light seeds are easily blown by the wind, and it is a pioneer species, one of the first trees to sprout on bare land or after a forest fire. It needs plenty of light and does best on dry, acidic soils and is found on heathland, mountainsides, and clinging to crags. Its tolerance to pollution make it suitable for planting in industrial areas and exposed sites. It has been introduced into North America, where it is known as the European white birch, and is considered invasive in the states of Kentucky, Maryland, Washington, and Wisconsin. It is naturalised and locally invasive in parts of Canada.

== Taxonomy ==
Three subspecies of silver birch are accepted:

- Betula pendula subsp. pendula – Europe and eastwards to central Asia
- Betula pendula subsp. mandshurica (Regel) Ashburner & McAll. – eastern Asia and western North America; treated by some botanists as Betula platyphylla
- Betula pendula subsp. szechuanica (C.K.Schneid.) Ashburner & McAll. – western China, from Qinghai and Gansu to Yunnan and southeast Xizang (Tibet), treated by some botanists as Betula szechuanica

B. pendula is distinguished from the related downy birch B. pubescens, the other common European birch, in having hairless, warty shoots (hairy and without warts in downy birch), more triangular leaves with double serration on the margins (more ovoid and with single serrations in downy birch), and whiter bark often with scattered black fissures (greyer, less fissured, in downy birch). It is also distinguished cytologically, silver birch being diploid (with two sets of chromosomes), whereas downy birch is tetraploid (four sets of chromosomes). Hybrids between the two are known, but are very rare, and being triploid, are sterile. The two have differences in habitat requirements, with silver birch found mainly on dry, sandy soils, and downy birch more common on wet, poorly drained sites such as clay soils and peat bogs. Silver birch also demands slightly more summer warmth than does downy birch, which is significant in the cooler parts of Europe. Some older North American texts treat the two species as conspecific (and cause confusion by combining the downy birch's alternative vernacular name 'white birch', with the scientific name B. pendula of the other species), but they are regarded as distinct species throughout Europe.

Several varieties of B. pendula are no longer accepted, including B. pendula var. carelica, fontqueri, laciniata, lapponica, meridionalis, microlepis, and parvibracteata, as well as forms Betula pendula f. bircalensis, crispa, and palmeri. The rejected name Betula alba L. also applied in part to B. pendula, though also to B. pubescens

== Ecology ==
The silver birch has an open canopy which allows plenty of light to reach the ground. This allows a variety of mosses, grasses, and flowering plants to grow beneath, which in turn attract insects. Flowering plants often found in birch woods include primrose (Primula vulgaris), violet (Viola riviniana), bluebell (Hyacinthoides non-scripta), wood anemone (Anemone nemorosa), and wood sorrel (Oxalis acetosella). Small shrubs that grow on the forest floor include blaeberry (Vaccinium myrtillus) and cowberry (Vaccinium vitis-idaea). Birds found in birch woodland include the chaffinch, tree pipit, willow warbler, nightingale, robin, woodcock, redpoll, and green woodpecker.

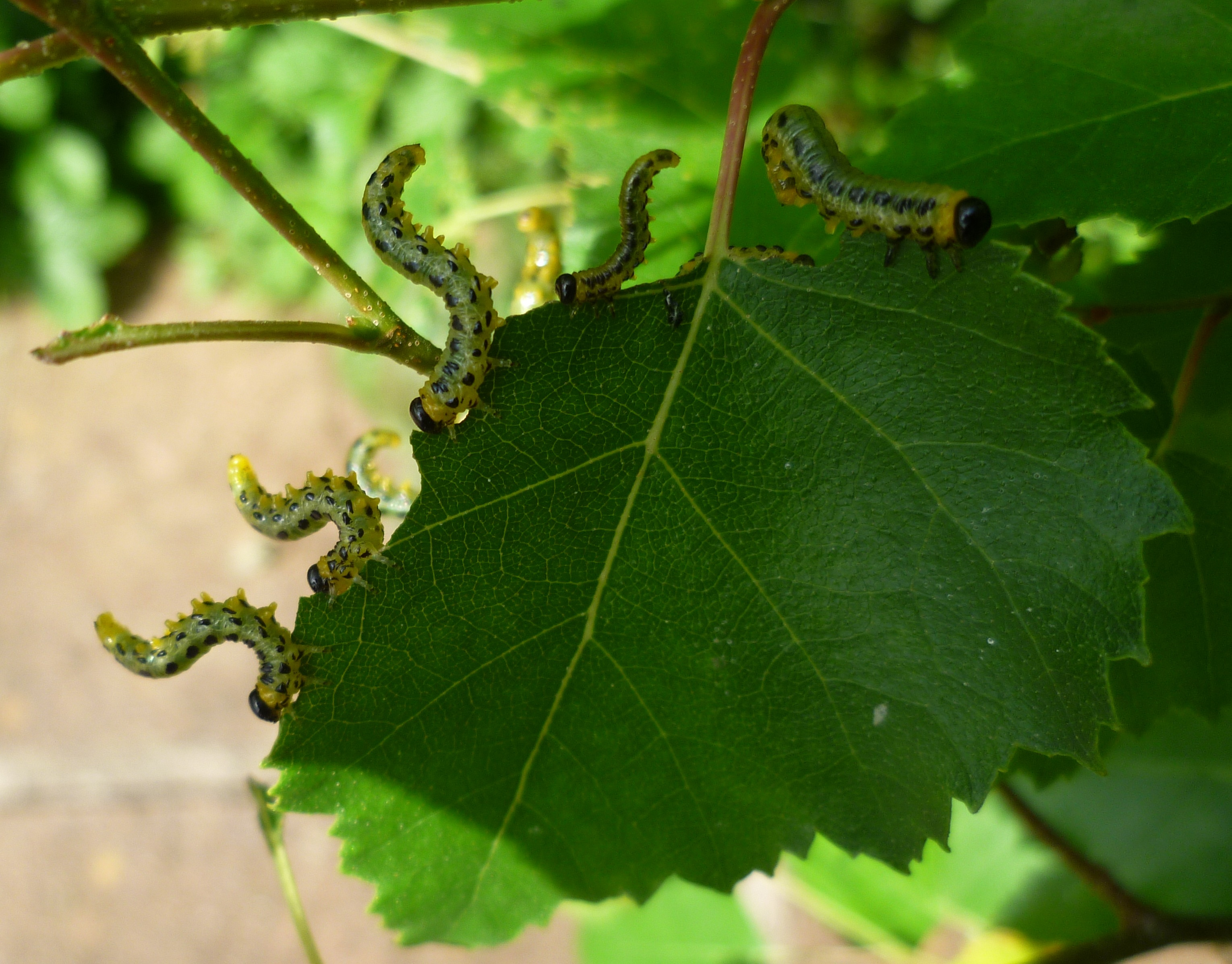
Birch sawfly (Craesus septentrionalis) larvae feeding on silver birch, West Wales, July 2014

The branches of the silver birch often have tangled masses of twigs known as witch's brooms growing among them, caused by the fungus Taphrina betulina. Old trees are often killed by the decay fungus Fomitopsis betulina and fallen branches rot rapidly on the forest floor. This tree commonly grows with the mycorrhizal fungus Amanita muscaria in a mutualistic relationship. This applies particularly to acidic or nutrient-poor soils. Other mycorrhizal associates include Leccinum scabrum and Cantharellus cibarius. In addition to mycorrhiza, the presence of microfauna in the soil assists the growth of the tree, as they enhance the mobility and uptake of nutrients through their more extensive hyphal networks.

The larvae of a large number of species of butterflies, moths, and other insects feed on the leaves and other parts of the silver birch. In Germany, almost 500 species of insects have been found on silver and downy birch including 106 beetles and 105 lepidopterans, with 133 insect species feeding almost exclusively on birch. Birch dieback disease can affect planted trees, while naturally regenerated trees seem less susceptible. This disease also affects B. pubescens and in 2000 was reported at many of the sites planted with birch in Scotland during the 1990s. In the United States, the wood is attacked by the bronze birch borer (Agrilus anxius), an insect pest to which it has no natural resistance.

== Conservation ==
Betula pendula is considered a species of least concern by the IUCN Red List. The synonym Betula oycowiensis (as B. oycoviensis) was previously listed on the Red List as vulnerable, though it is now considered a synonym of B. pendula subsp. pendula. B. szaferi was previously considered extinct in the wild on the Red List, but is now considered a form of B. pendula with the presence of a mutant gene, causing it to grow weakly and fruit heavily.

== Uses ==
The silver birch is Finland's national tree. Leafy, fragrant bunches of young silver birch boughs (called vihta or vasta) are used to gently beat oneself while bathing in the Finnish sauna. Silver birch is often planted in parks and gardens, grown for its white bark and gracefully drooping shoots, sometimes even in warmer-than-optimum places such as Los Angeles and Sydney. In Scandinavia and other regions of northern Europe, it is grown for forest products such as lumber and pulp, as well as for aesthetic purposes and ecosystem services. It is sometimes used as a pioneer and nurse tree elsewhere.

Silver birch wood is pale in colour with a light reddish-brown heartwood and is used in making furniture, plywood, veneers, parquet blocks, skis, and kitchen utensils, and in turnery. It makes good firewood, but is quickly consumed by the flames. Slabs of bark are used for making roof shingles and strips are used for handicrafts such as bast shoes and small containers. Historically, the bark was used for tanning. Bark can be heated and the resin collected; the resin is an excellent waterproof glue and useful for starting fires. The thin sheets of bark that peel off young wood contain a waxy resin and are easy to ignite even when wet. The dead twigs are also useful as kindling for outdoor fires. The removal of bark was at one time so widespread that Carl Linnaeus expressed his concern for the survival of the woodlands.

Birch brushwood is used for racecourse jumps and besom brooms. In the spring, large quantities of sap rise up the trunk and this can be tapped. It contains around 1% sugar and can be used in a similar way to maple syrup, being drunk fresh, concentrated by evaporation, or fermented into a "wine".

=== Phytochemicals ===
The outer part of the bark contains up to 20% betulin. The main components in the essential oil of the buds are α-copaene (~10%), germacrene D (~15%), and δ-cadinene (~13%). Also present in the bark are other triterpene substances which have been used in laboratory research to identify its possible biological properties.

Betula spp.
Clinical data
- Trade names: Itulatek (Canada); Filsuvez (Europe)
- Routes of administration: Sublingual
- ATC code: V01AA05 (WHO)

Legal status
- Legal status: CA: Rx-only / Schedule D

Identifiers
- DrugBank: DB11004
- UNII: ZL5TV40C5Y

=== Pharmaceuticals ===
A standardised allergen extract from "white birch", sold under the brand name Itulatek, is indicated in Canada as a sublingual agent to test for and limit allergic reactions to tree pollen from birch, alder and/or hazel in people with allergic rhinitis (with or without conjunctivitis).

The combination of extracts from Betula pendula and Betula pubescens is approved in Europe to treat epidermolysis bullosa.

== Cultivation ==
Silver birch grows best in full sun in light, well-drained soil. As it is shallow-rooted, it may be prone to drought damage in dry periods. Successful silver birch cultivation requires a climate cool enough for at least the occasional winter snowfall.

=== Cultivars and varieties ===
- 'Carelica' or "curly birch" is called visakoivu in Finland. The wood is hard and burled throughout; it is prized for its decorative appearance and is used in wood-carving and as veneer.
- 'Laciniata' agm (commonly misidentified as 'Dalecarlica') has deeply incised leaves and weeping branches
- 'Purpurea' has dark purple leaves
- 'Tristis' agm has an erect trunk with weeping branchlets
- 'Youngii' has dense, twiggy, weeping growth with no central leader and requires being grafted onto a standard stem of normal silver birch.

The cultivars marked agm above have gained the Royal Horticultural Society's Award of Garden Merit.

== Gallery ==
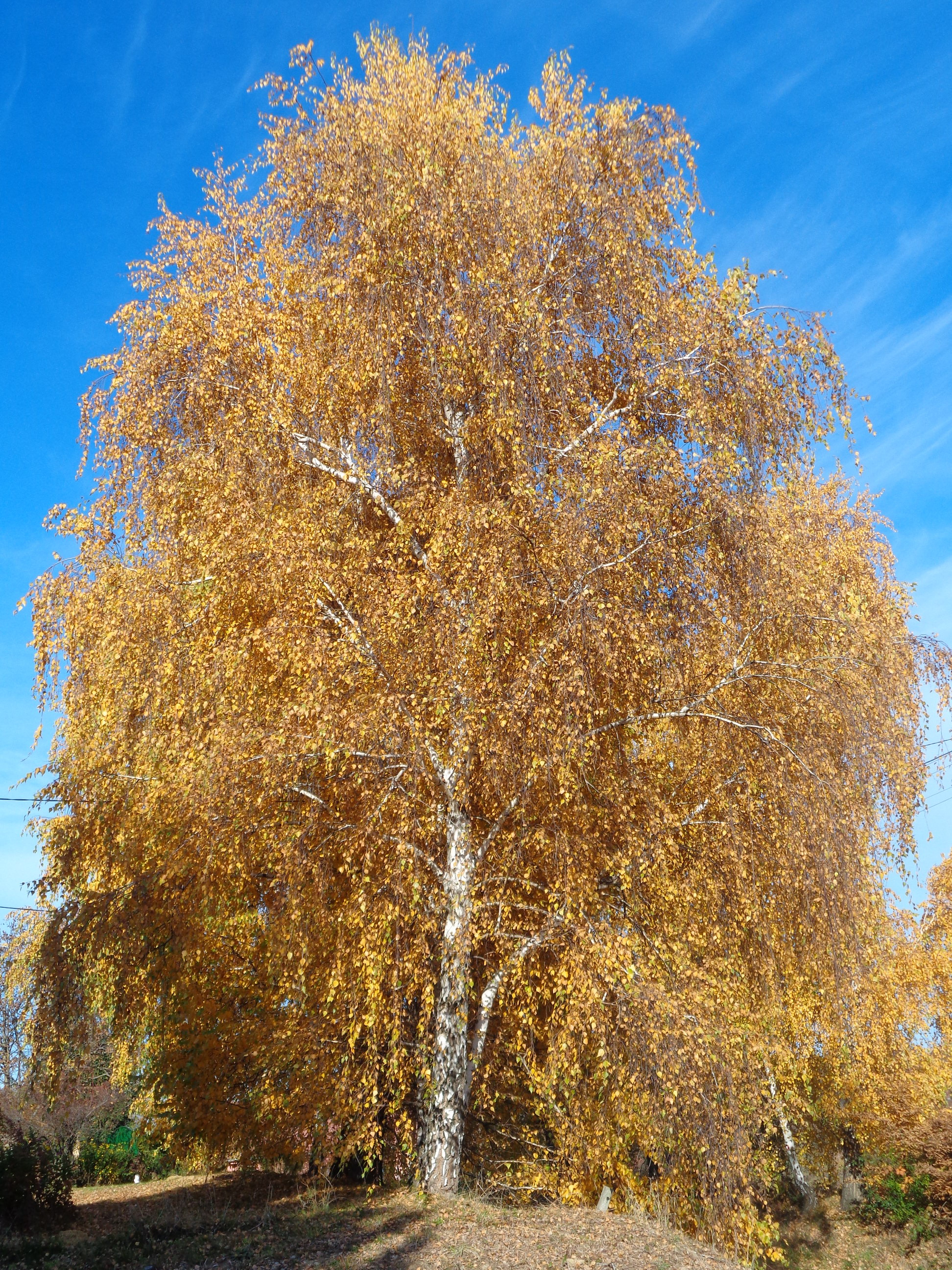
Tree in autumn

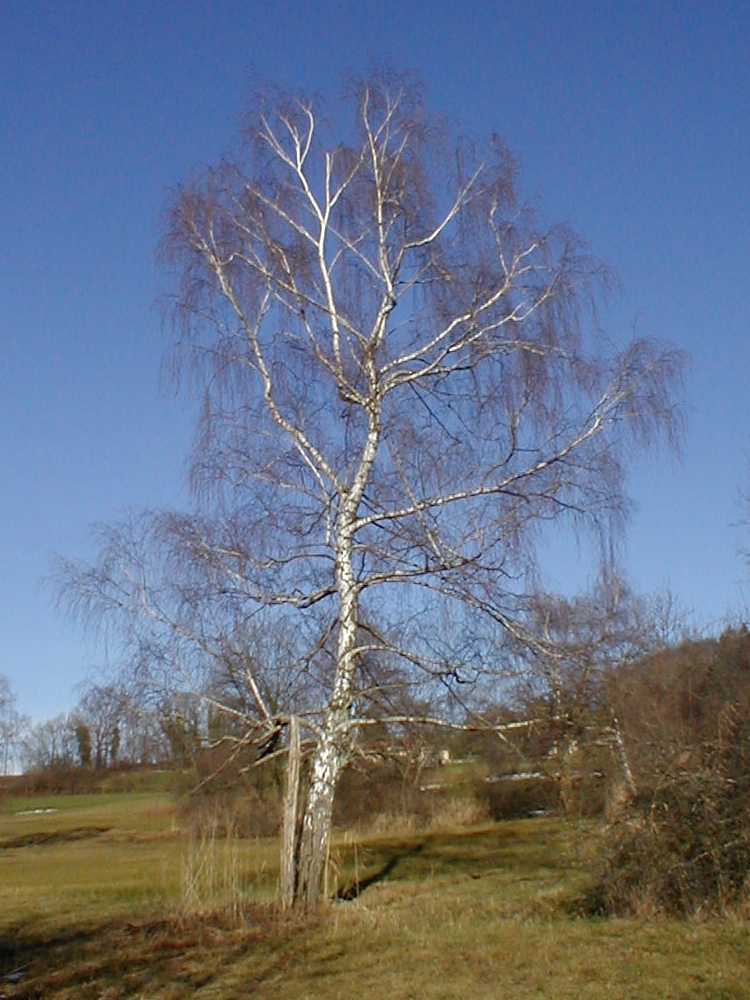
Tree in winter

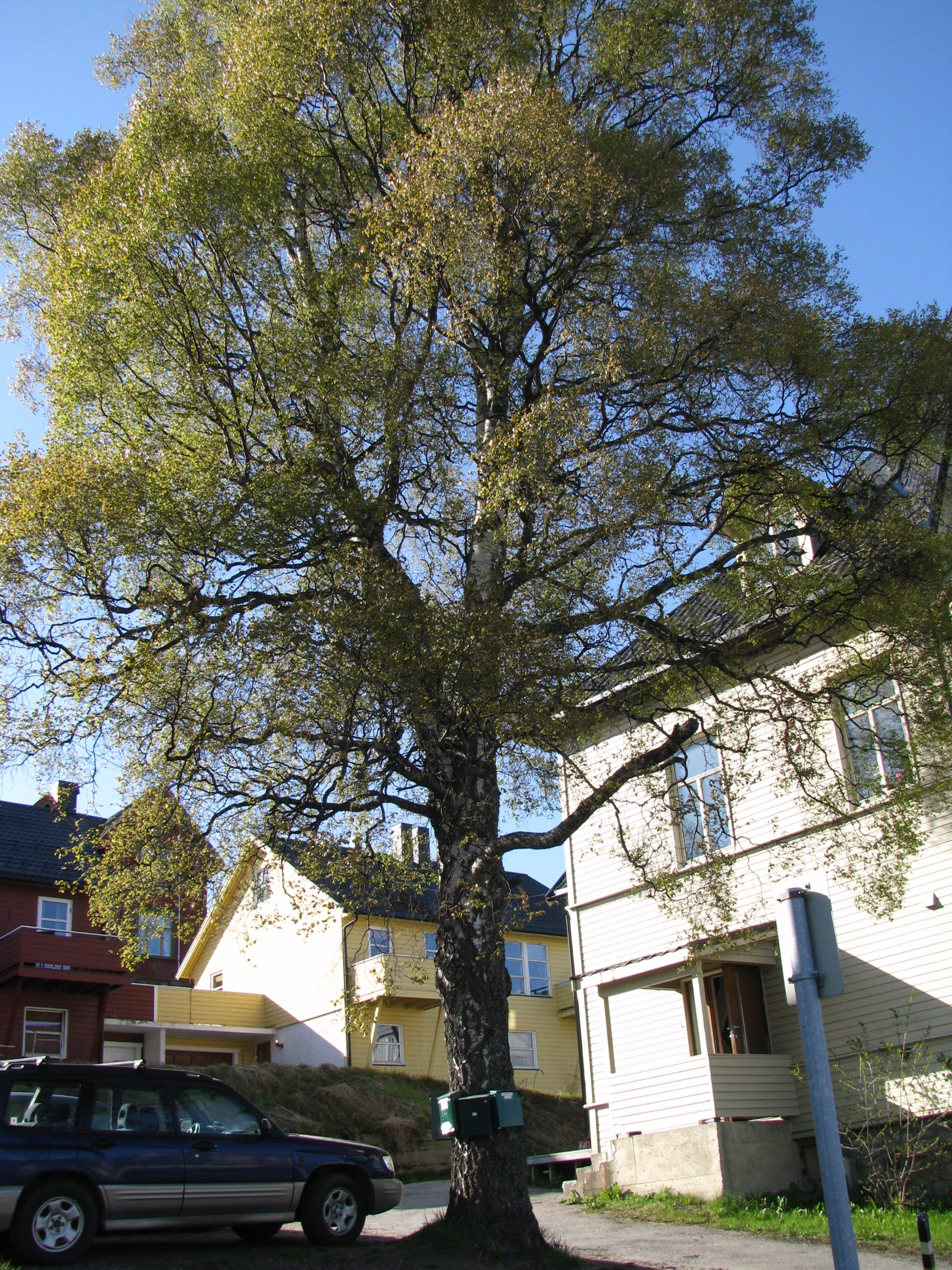
Betula pendula in Tromsø in May, Northern Norway

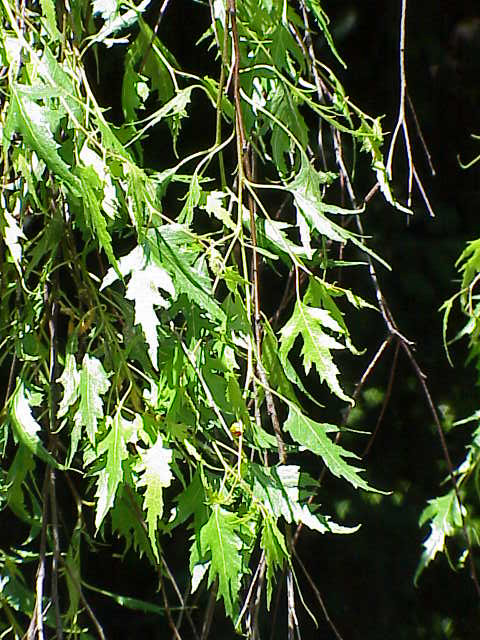
B. pendula 'Laciniata'

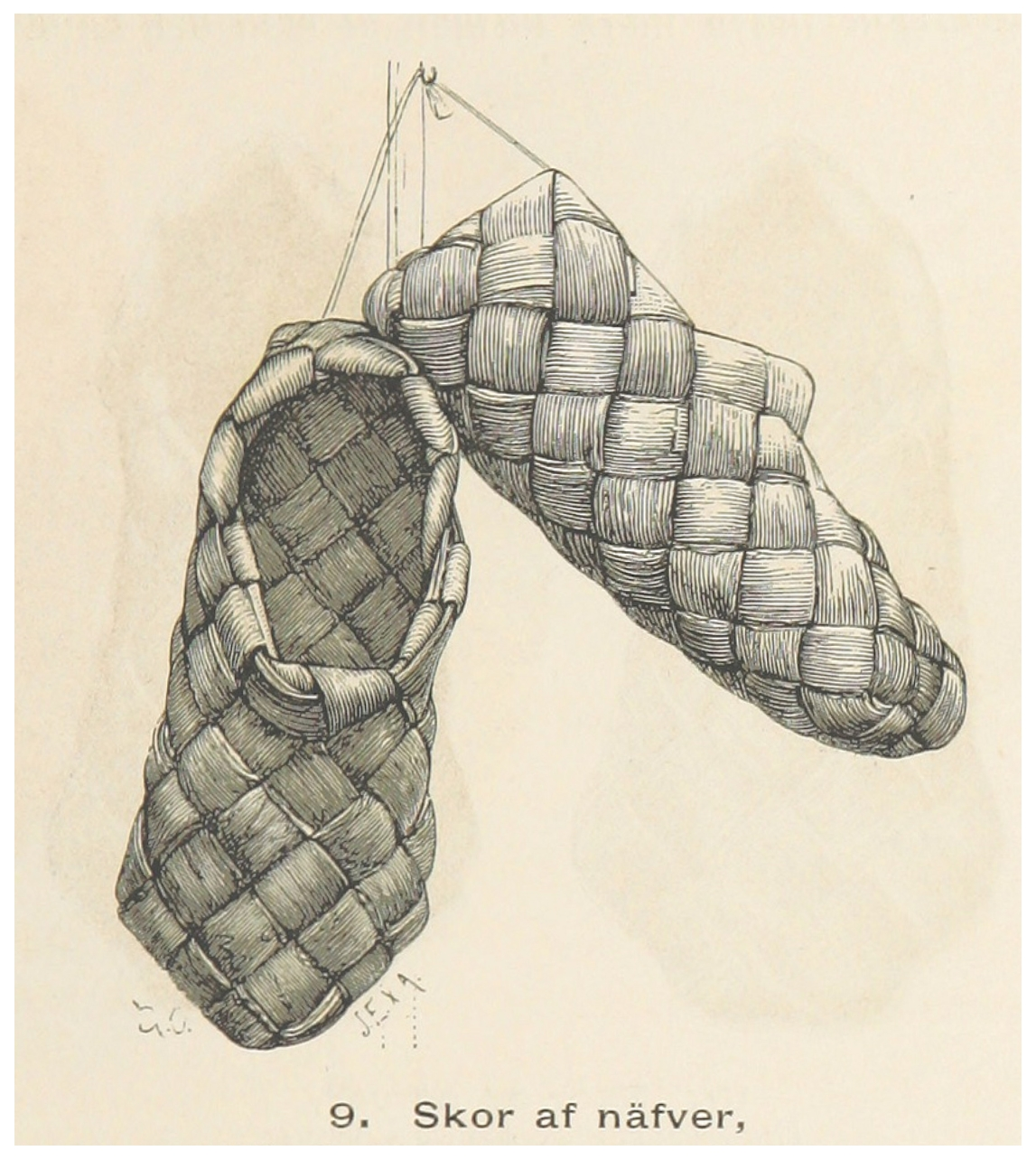
A pair of Finnish traditional shoes woven from strips of birch bark
