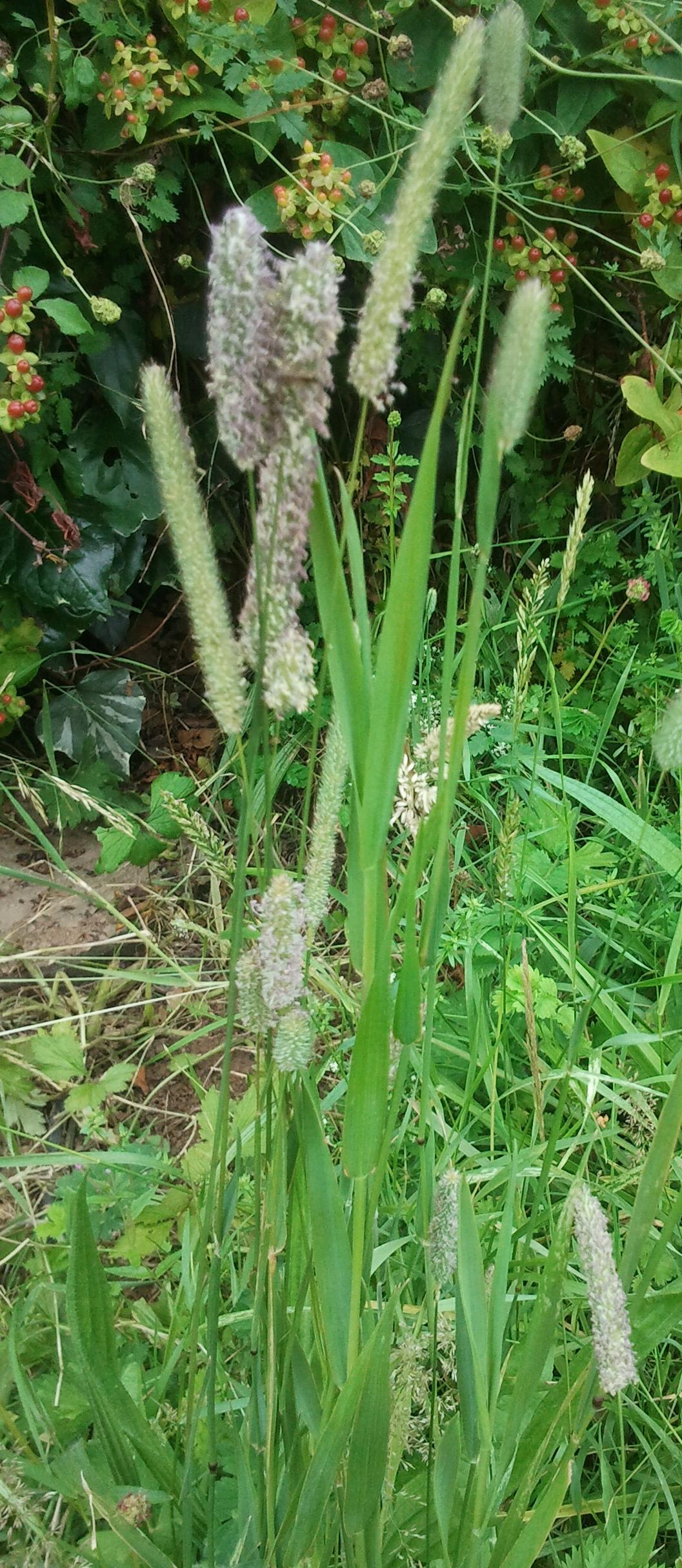
- Habitus

Conservation status
- Least Concern (IUCN 3.1)

Scientific classification
- Kingdom: Plantae
- Clade: Embryophytes
- Clade: Tracheophytes
- Clade: Angiosperms
- Clade: Monocots
- Clade: Commelinids
- Order: Poales
- Family: Poaceae
- Subfamily: Pooideae
- Genus: Phleum
- Species: P. pratense

Binomial name
- Phleum pratense L.

Synonyms
- Achnodonton bulbosum (Gouan) J.Woods; Phleum alpinum subsp. trabutii Litard. & Maire; Phleum bertolonii subsp. trabutii (Litard. & Maire) Kerguélen; Phleum brachystachyum (Salis) Gamisans, A.T.Romero & C.Morales; Phleum bulbosum Gouan; Phleum deckeri Roem. ex Trin.; Phleum fallax Janka; Phleum maximum Pryor; Phleum microstachyum Ruiz ex Nyman; Phleum nodosum L.; Phleum parnassicum Boiss. & Heldr. ex Nyman; Phleum pratense subsp. brachystachyum (Salis) Gamisans; Phleum pratense f. elongatum (Schur) Serb. & Nyár.; Phleum pratense f. fallax (Janka) Serb. & Nyár.; Phleum pratense subsp. microstachyum (Ruiz ex Nyman) Malag.; Phleum pratense subsp. nodosum (L.) Dumort.; Phleum pratense subsp. roshevitzii (Pavlov) Tzvelev; Phleum pratense var. stoloniferum (Host) Rchb.; Phleum pratense subsp. trabutii (Litard. & Maire) Kerguélen; Phleum pratense subsp. vulgare Asch. & Graebn.; Phleum roshevitzii Pavlov; Phleum stoloniferum Host; Phleum trabutii (Litard. & Maire) Rivas Mart., A.Asensi, Molero Mesa & F.Valle; Phleum tuberosum Panz. ex Trin.; Phleum villosum Opiz; Phleum vulgare Chase & Niles; Plantinia pratensis (L.) Bubani; Stelephuros pratensis (L.) Lunell

= Timothy (grass) =

Species of grass

Timothy (Phleum pratense) is a species of perennial grass native to most of Europe and northern and western Asia. It is also known as timothy-grass, meadow cat's-tail or common cat's-tail. It is a member of the genus Phleum, which consists of 17 species of annual and perennial grasses.

It is probably named after Timothy Hanson, a British farmer and agriculturalist said to have introduced it from New England to the southern United States in the early 18th century. Upon his recommendation it became a major source of hay and cattle fodder to British farmers in the mid-18th century.

Timothy has now become naturalised throughout most of North America, eastern Asia, southern South America, and Australasia.

== Description ==
Timothy grows to 150 cm (59 in) tall, with leaves up to 50 cm (20 in) long and 4–8 mm (0.2–0.3 in) broad. The leaves are hairless, rolled rather than folded, and the lower sheaths turn dark brown.

It is a tufted grass, with no stolons or rhizomes. The ligule is short and blunt.

The flowerhead is 6–15 cm (2–6 in) long (or more, in some cultivars) and 6–10 mm (0.2–0.4 in) broad, with densely packed spikelets, the glumes with a 1–2 mm long awn. It flowers from June until August. The stamens are purple.

Timothy can be confused with smaller cat's-tail (Phleum bertolonii); this is most easily distinguished by its acute, not blunt, ligules. Meadow foxtail (Alopecurus pratensis) or purple-stem cat's-tail (Phleum phleoides) can also be confused.

It grows well in heavy soil, and is noted for its resistance to cold and drought, and thus ability to grow in dry upland or poor sandy soils. In pasture it tends to be overwhelmed by more competitive grasses. After cutting it grows slowly.

== Taxonomy ==
Two subspecies have been distinguished by some authors, Phleum pratense subsp. pratense, and Phleum pratense subsp. bertolonii on calcareous grassland; however, the latter is now generally considered to be a separate species, smaller cat's-tail Phleum bertolonii DC.

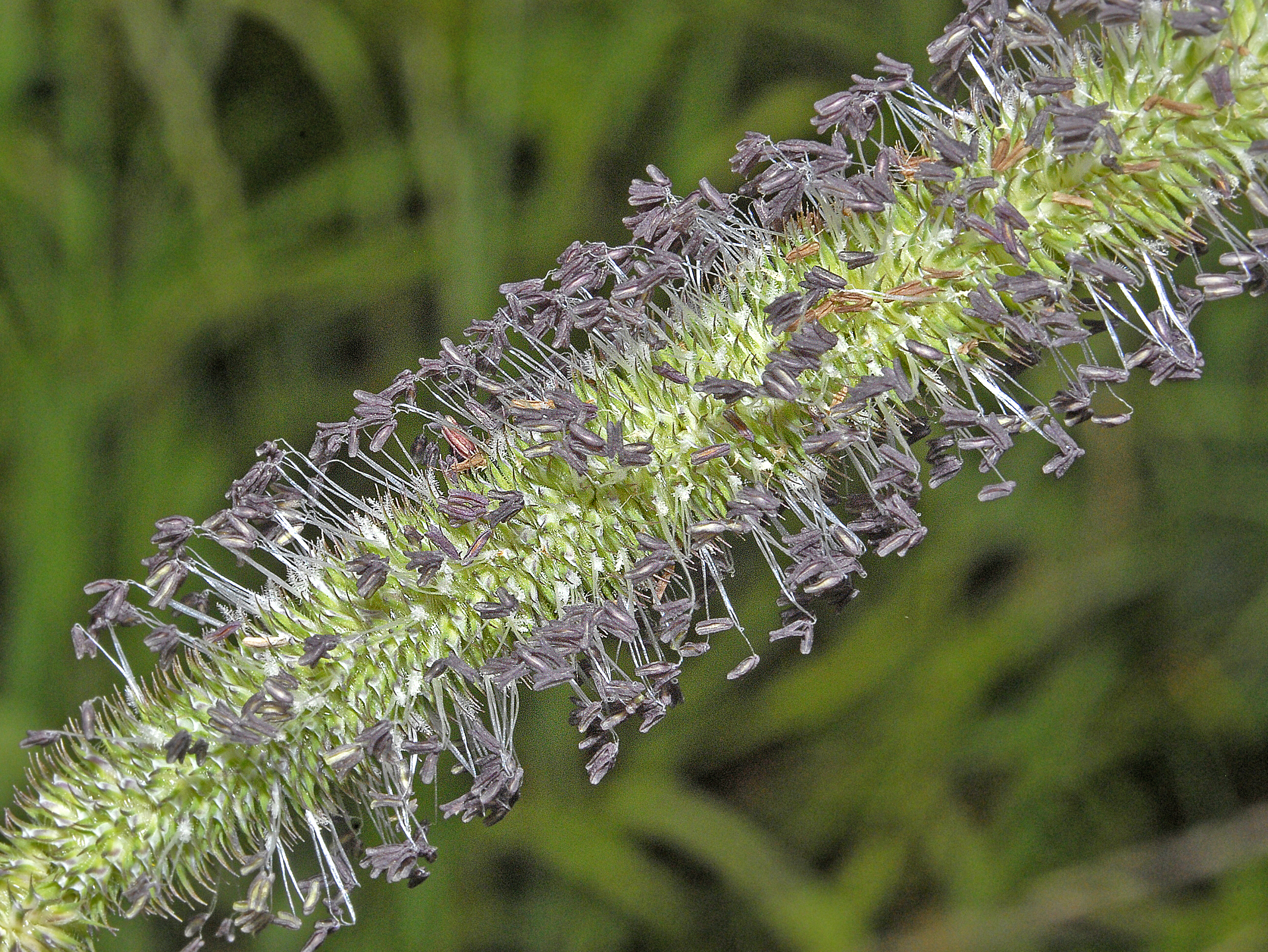
Close-up of flower head showing the purple stamens (3 per floret) and feathery stigma (2 per floret)

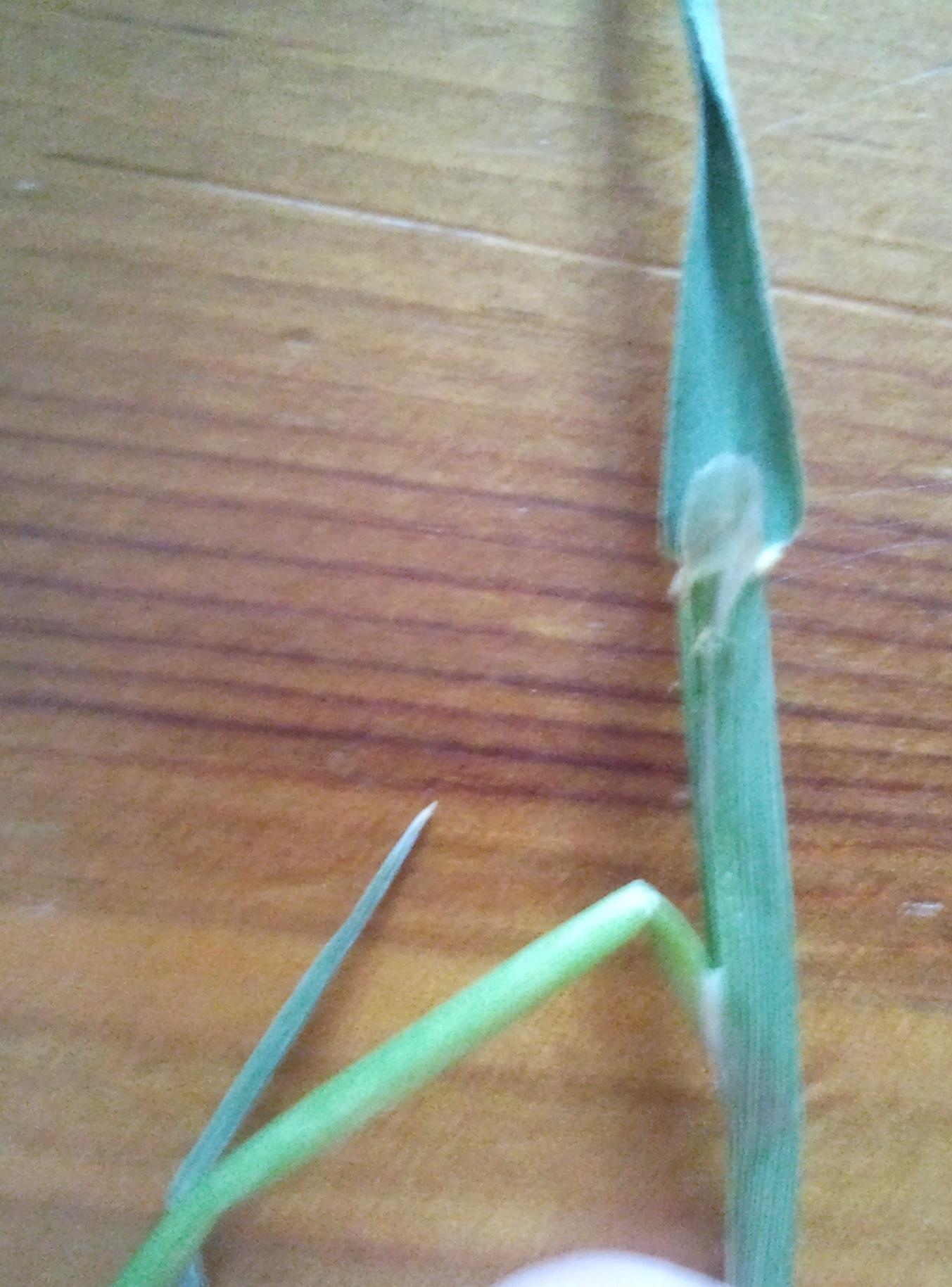
The ligule is short and blunt

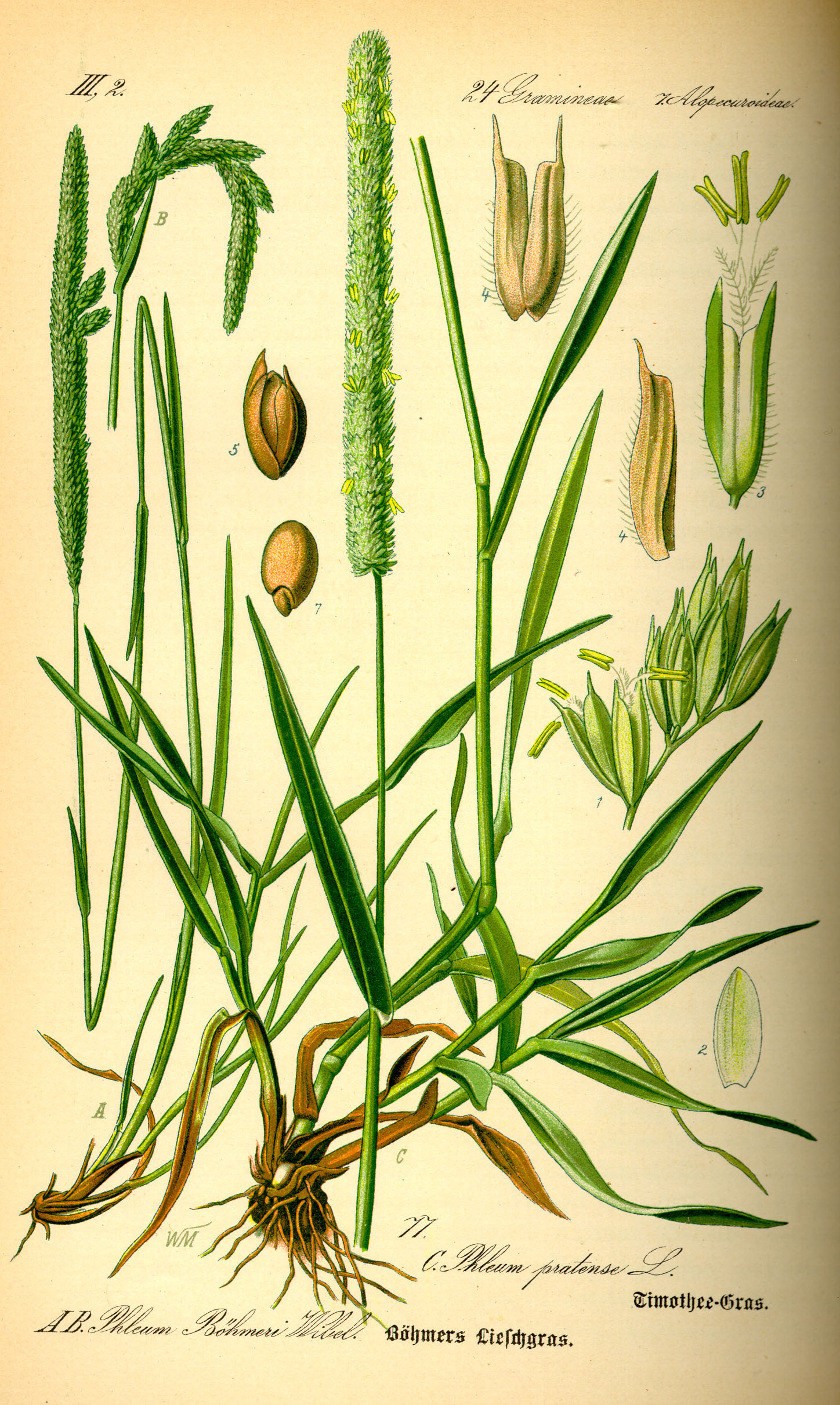
Showing bulbous base and brown leaf sheaths

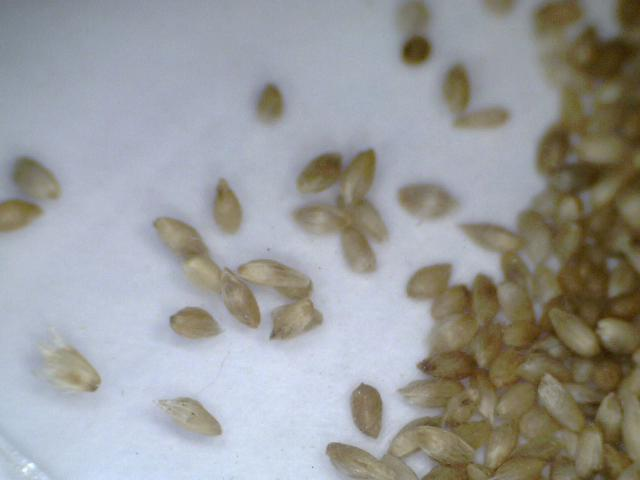
Seeds

== Ecology ==
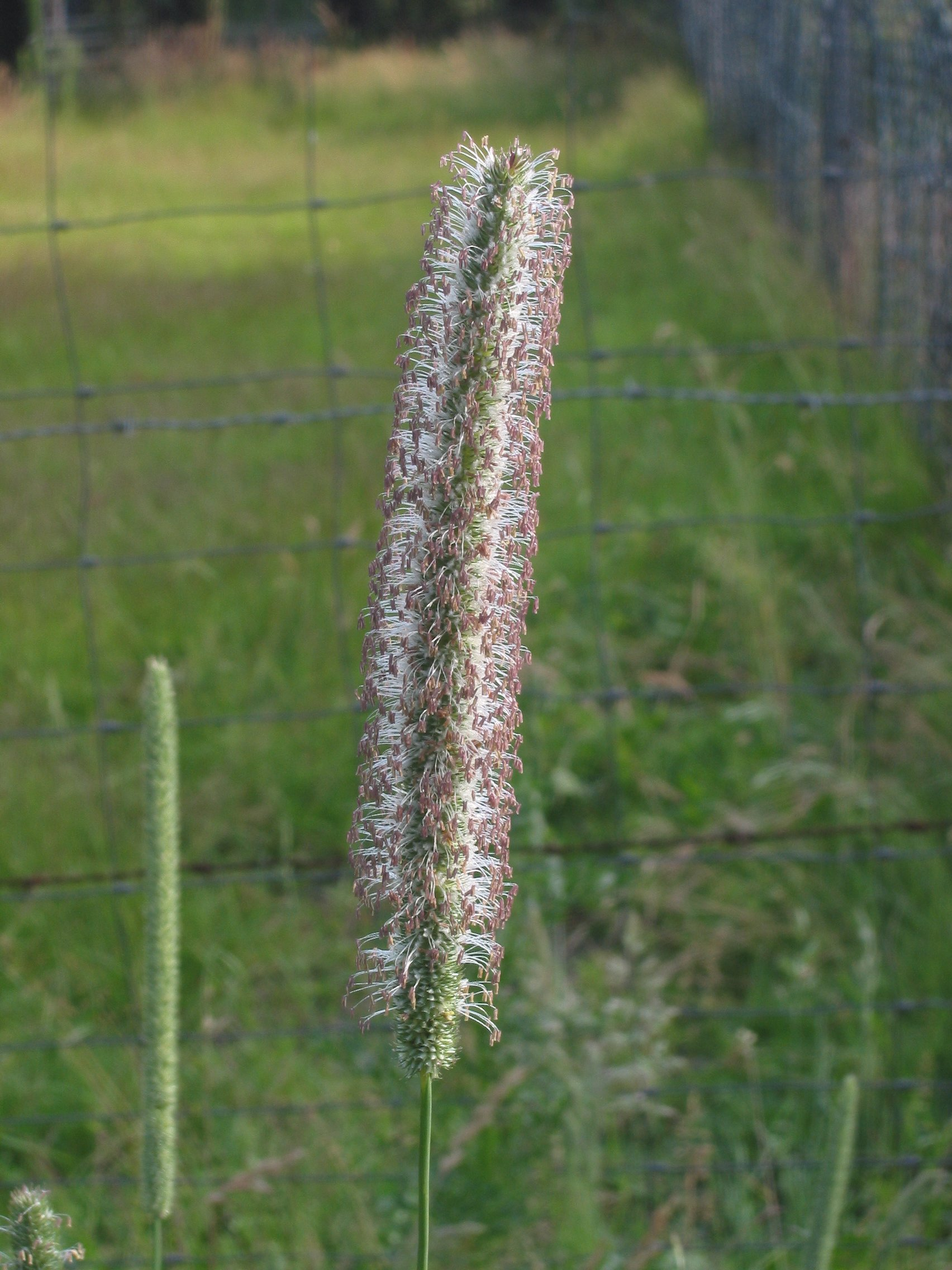
Inflorescence

Some caterpillars use it as a food plant, e.g. the Essex skipper (Thymelicus lineola) and the marbled white (Melanargia galathea). It also grows in roadsides and abandoned fields but generally requires nutrient-rich soils.

== Cultivation and uses ==
It is commonly grown for cattle feed and, in particular, as hay for horses. It is relatively high in fibre, especially when cut late. It is considered a harsh, coarse grass little relished by livestock if cut earlier. It is considered part of the standard mix for grass hay and provides quality nutrition for horses. Timothy hay is a staple food for domestic pet rabbits, guinea pigs, chinchillas, and degus, often making up the bulk of their diet. Timothy hay is rich in long fibres and its abrasive texture helps to grind down the teeth, keeping both the teeth and jaw in good order.

Plants persist through the winter. Dead, straw-coloured flowering stems may persist, but only for a short time, and can be recognised by the distinctive spike-like inflorescence.

Timothy was unintentionally introduced to North America by early settlers, and was first described in 1711 by John Hurd from plants growing in New Hampshire. Hurd named the grass "hurd grass" but a farmer named Timothy Hanson began to promote cultivation of it as a hay about 1720, and the grass has been known by its present name since then.

=== Medical uses ===
Timothy grass pollen allergen extract (Phleum pratense)
Clinical data
- Trade names: Grazax, Grastek
- AHFS/Drugs.com: Micromedex Detailed Consumer Information
- License data: US DailyMed: Timothy grass
- Routes of administration: Sublingual
- ATC code: V01AA02 (WHO)

Legal status
- Legal status: AU: S4 (Prescription only); US: ℞-only

Identifiers
- DrugBank: DB14179
- UNII: 65M88RW2EG

Timothy grass pollen allergen is used to treat hay fever.

=== Breeding objectives in timothy ===
Breeding programs for forage grasses and especially timothy have been focusing on the improvement of dry matter yield, resistance to disease, dry matter digestibility, and nutritional value, which depends on target species and environment. Due to high phenotypic and genetic heterogeneity in individual plants, and the polyploidy of many species, breeding programmes for timothy are accompanied by some difficulties.

== Confusion with other species ==
It is often confused with meadow foxtail (Alopecurus pratensis). Timothy flowers later, from June until August, whereas meadow foxtail flowers from April until June. The spikelets of timothy are twin hornlike projections arranged in cylindrical panicles, whereas foxtail has a soft, single awn.

Purple-stem cat's-tail (Phleum phleoides) prefers lighter soils and grows on chalk downland.

Timothy canary grass (Phalaris angusta), another species with a similar cylindrical panicle, is toxic to livestock.

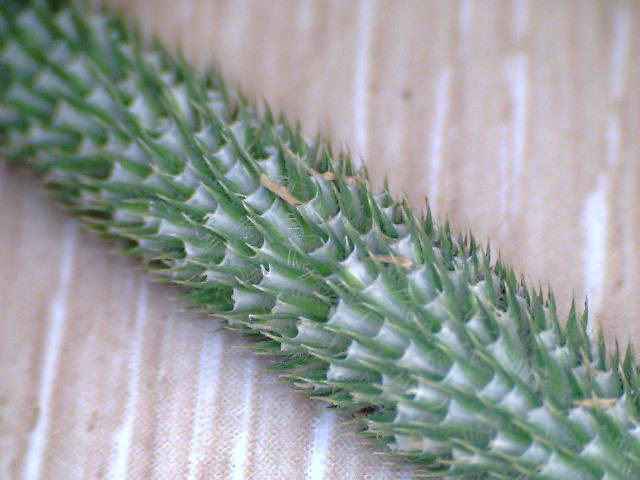
Close-up of flower head showing hornlike spikelets

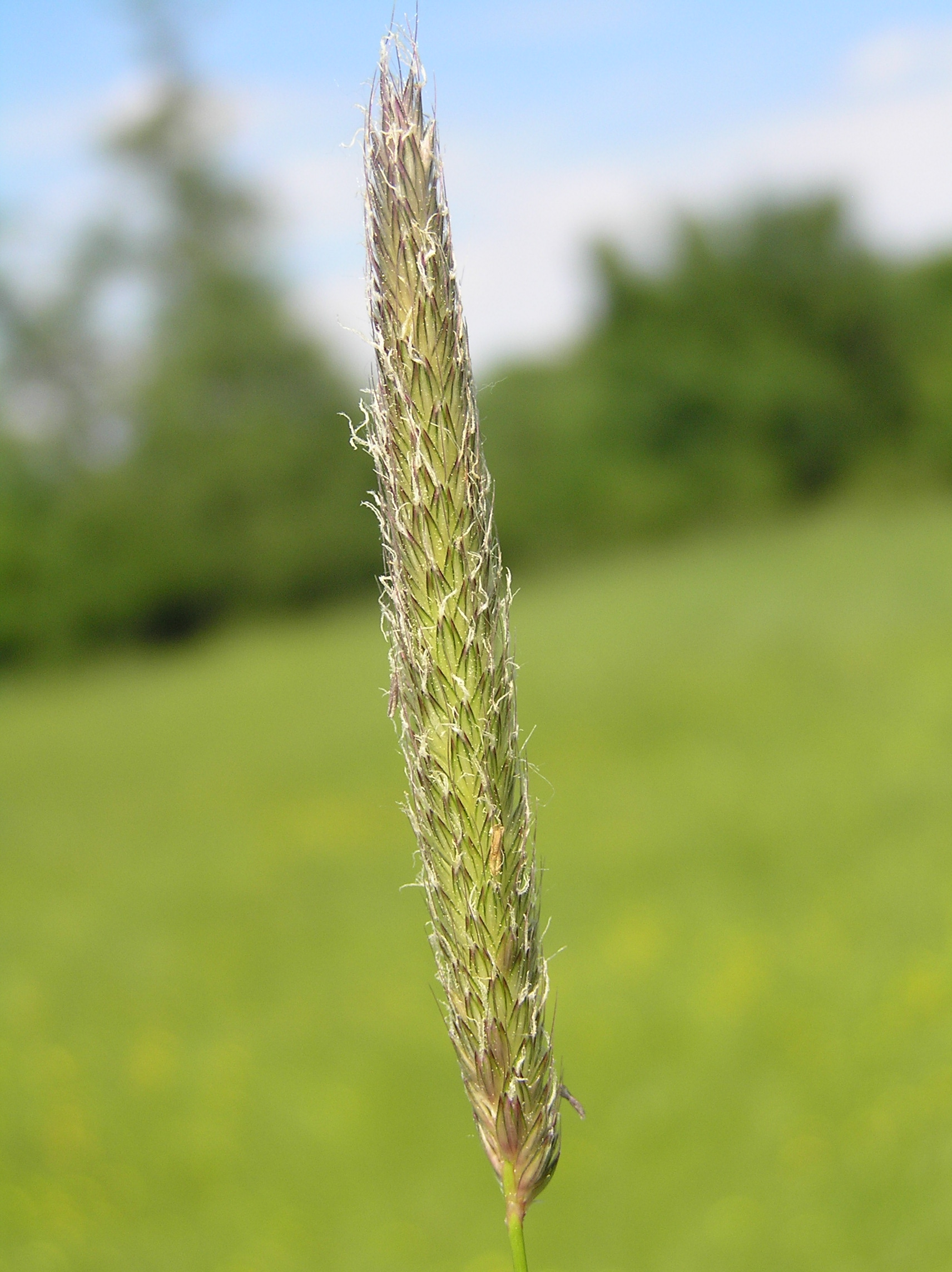
Meadow foxtail (Alopecurus pratensis) spikelet
