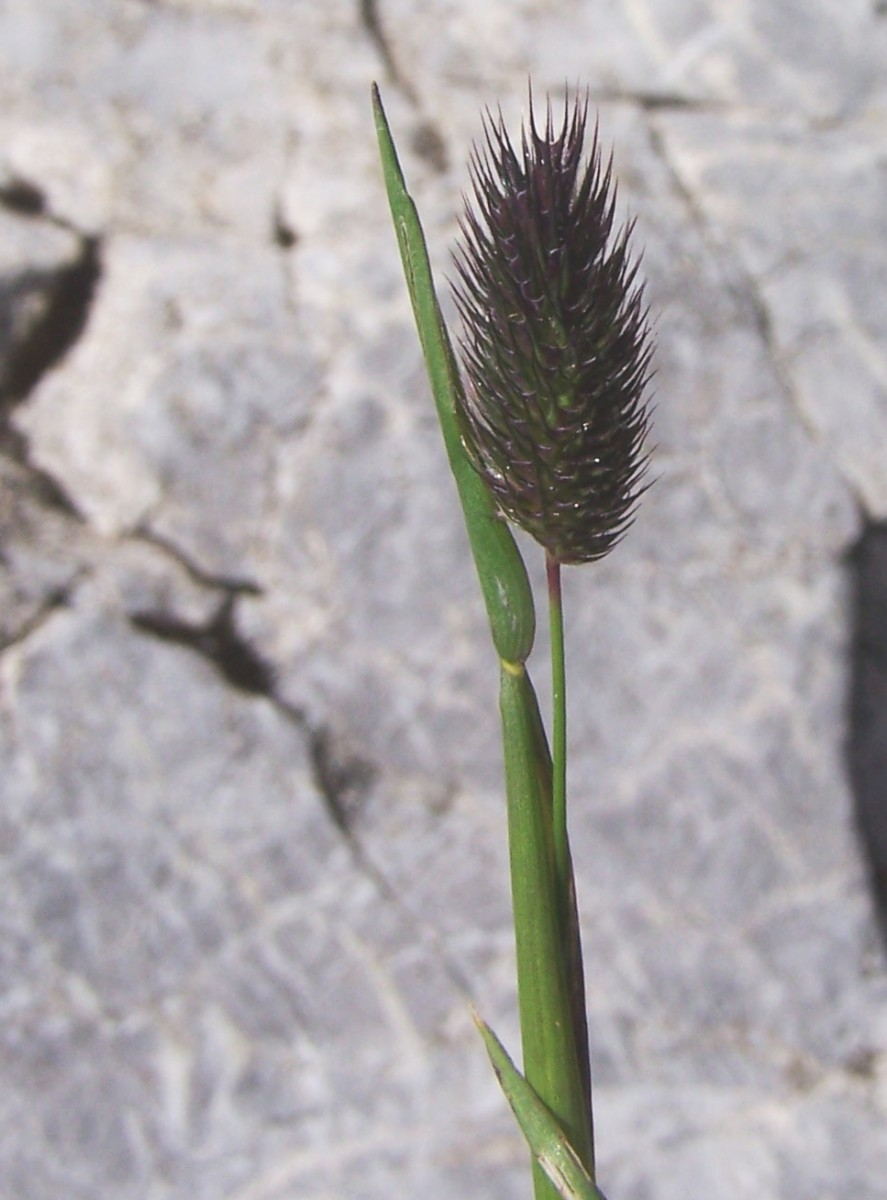

Conservation status
- Least Concern (IUCN 3.1)

Scientific classification
- Kingdom: Plantae
- Clade: Embryophytes
- Clade: Tracheophytes
- Clade: Angiosperms
- Clade: Monocots
- Clade: Commelinids
- Order: Poales
- Family: Poaceae
- Subfamily: Pooideae
- Genus: Phleum
- Species: P. alpinum

Binomial name
- Phleum alpinum L.

= Phleum alpinum =

Species of flowering plant

Phleum alpinum is a species of grass known by the common names alpine cat's-tail, alpine timothy and mountain timothy.

== Distribution ==
Phleum alpinum has a circumboreal distribution, inhabiting northern areas of the Northern Hemisphere, as well as extending down through the Americas to southern South America. It can be found on islands in the subantarctic region such as South Georgia Island, on which it is one of the most common plant species.

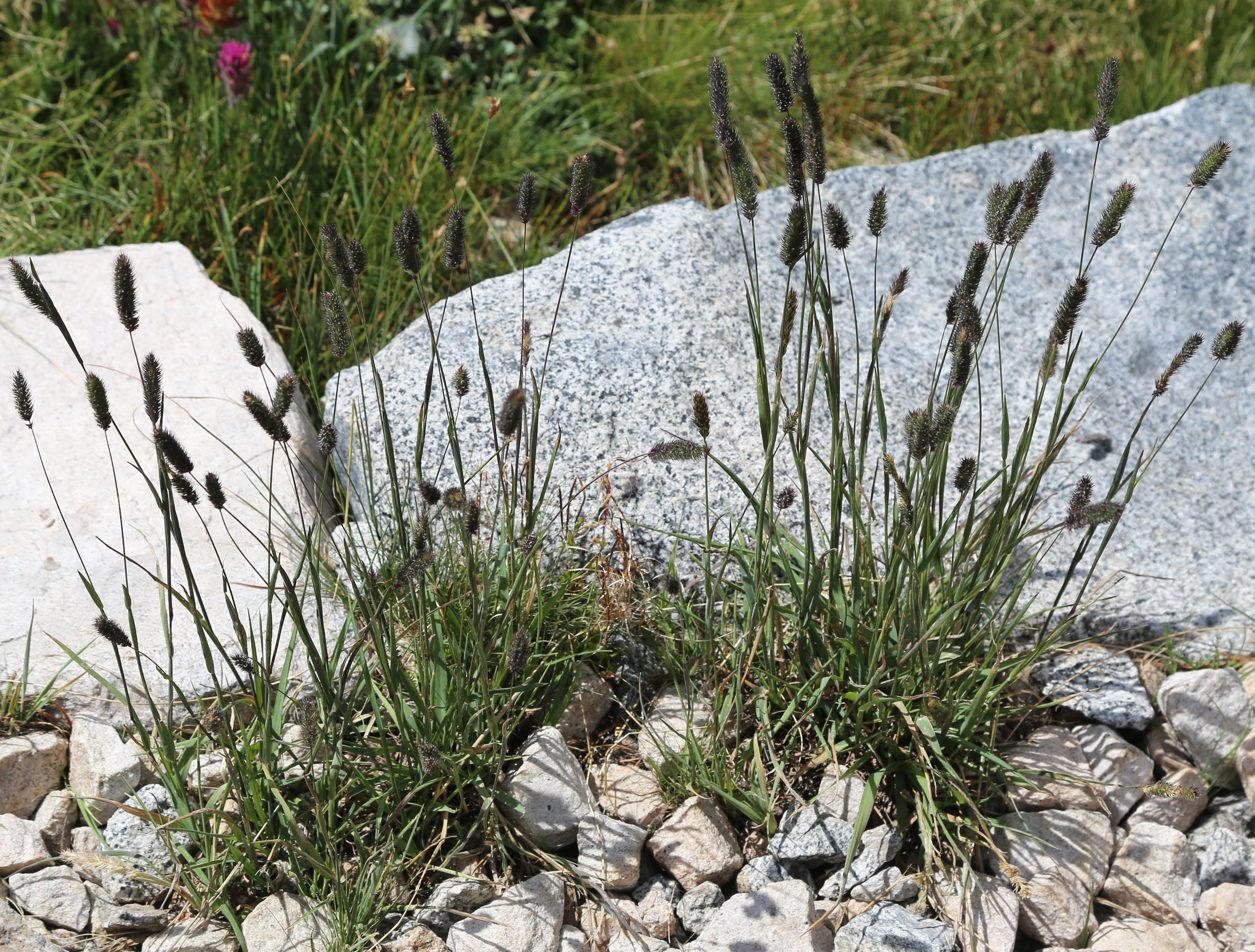
Phleum alpinum, clumps at 11,000 ft (3,400 m) in the Sierra Nevada USA

== Description ==
Phleum alpinum is a perennial bunchgrass forming loose clumps 20 to 60 centimetres (7.9 to 23.6 in) tall. The inflorescence is a cylindrical to oval mass of spikelets up to 6 centimetres (2.4 in) long and 1.2 cm (0.47 in) wide.
