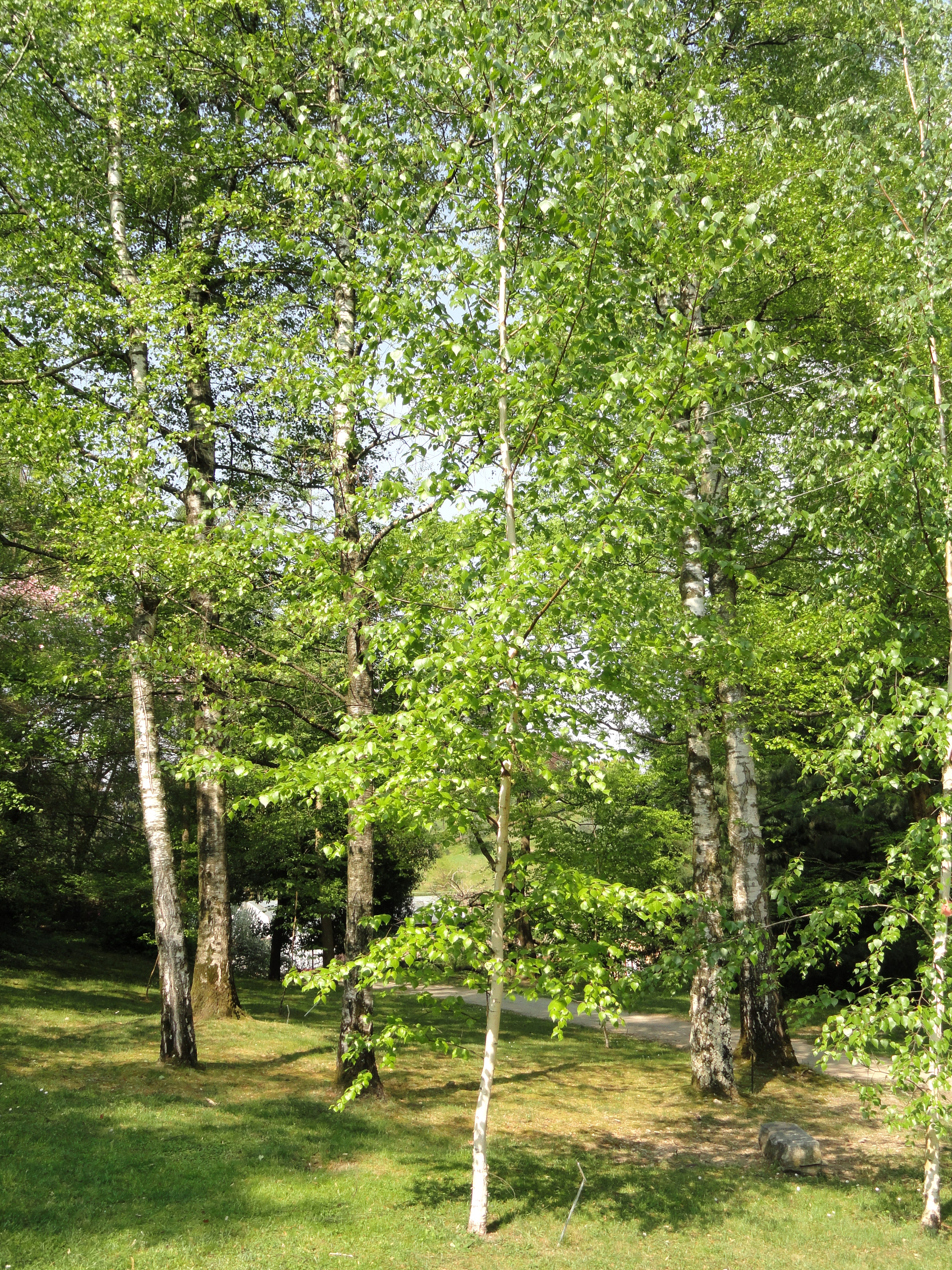

Conservation status
- Data Deficient (IUCN 3.1)

Scientific classification
- Kingdom: Plantae
- Clade: Embryophytes
- Clade: Tracheophytes
- Clade: Angiosperms
- Clade: Eudicots
- Clade: Rosids
- Order: Fagales
- Family: Betulaceae
- Genus: Betula
- Subgenus: Betula subg. Betula
- Species: B. pendula
- Subspecies: B. p. subsp. szechuanica

Trinomial name
- Betula pendula subsp. szechuanica (C.K.Schneid.) Ashburner & McAll.

Synonyms
- Betula japonica var. rockii Rehder; Betula japonica var. szechuanica C.K.Schneid.; Betula mandshurica var. rockii (Rehder) Rehder; Betula mandshurica var. szechuanica (C.K.Schneid.) Rehder; Betula platyphylla var. rockii (Rehder) Rehder; Betula platyphylla var. szechuanica (C.K.Schneid.) Rehder; Betula rockii (Rehder) C.-A.Jansson; Betula szechuanica (C.K.Schneid.) C.-A.Jansson

= Betula pendula subsp. szechuanica =

Species of flowering plant

Betula pendula subsp. szechuanica, the Sichuan birch or Szechuan birch, is a birch subspecies native to southeastern Tibet, Gansu, Qinghai, Sichuan, and northern Yunnan in western China. It is conical in shape, growing to 20 meters in height, with white bark, yellow-green male catkins or green female catkins, and dark, blue-green leaves.
