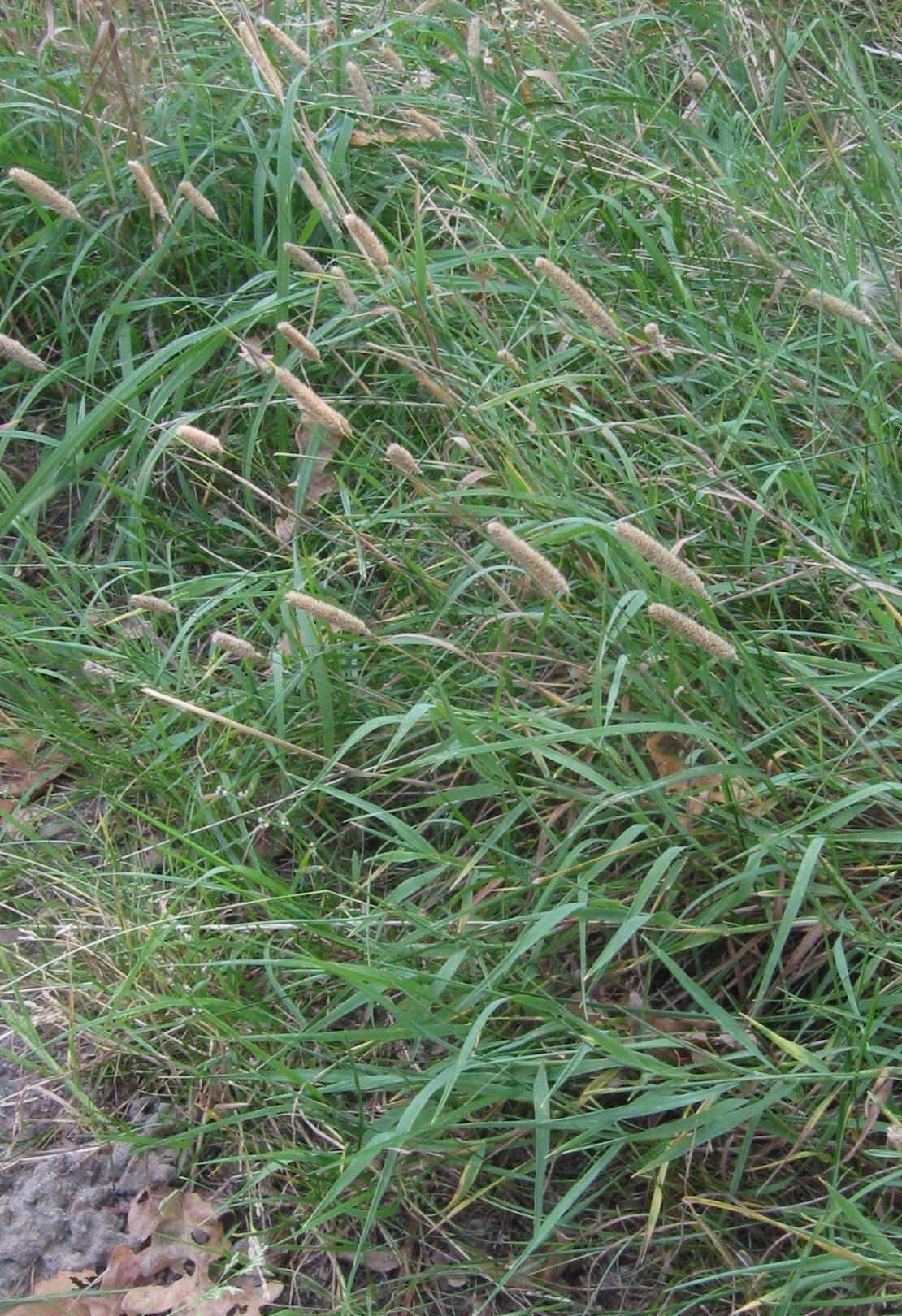

Scientific classification
- Kingdom: Plantae
- Clade: Tracheophytes
- Clade: Angiosperms
- Clade: Monocots
- Clade: Commelinids
- Order: Poales
- Family: Poaceae
- Subfamily: Pooideae
- Genus: Phleum
- Species: P. bertolonii

Binomial name
- Phleum bertolonii DC.

Synonyms
- Phleum pratense subsp. bertolonii (DC.)

= Phleum bertolonii =

Species of grass

Phleum bertolonii (smaller cat's-tail) is a species of perennial grass native to most of Europe, southwestern Asia, and northwestern Africa. It is a member of the genus Phleum, which consists of 17 species of annual and perennial grasses.

== Description ==
Phleum bertolonii grows to 50 cm (20 in) tall, rarely 70 cm (28 in) tall, with leaves 2–6 mm (0.1–0.2 in) broad. The leaves have short, narrow, acute-tipped ligules.

The flowerhead is up to 8 cm (3 in) long and 3–7.5 mm (0.1–0.3 in) broad, with densely packed spikelets, the glumes with a 0.2–1.2 mm long awn. It flowers from June until August.

It has often been confused with Timothy (Phleum pratense); this is most easily distinguished by its broad, blunt ligules, and is a much larger plant, growing to 150 cm, 2–3 times as tall as P. bertolonii and with flowerheads twice as long.

== Taxonomy ==
In the past, it was often considered a subspecies of Phleum pratense, as Phleum pratense subsp. bertolonii, but is now generally considered to be a separate species.
