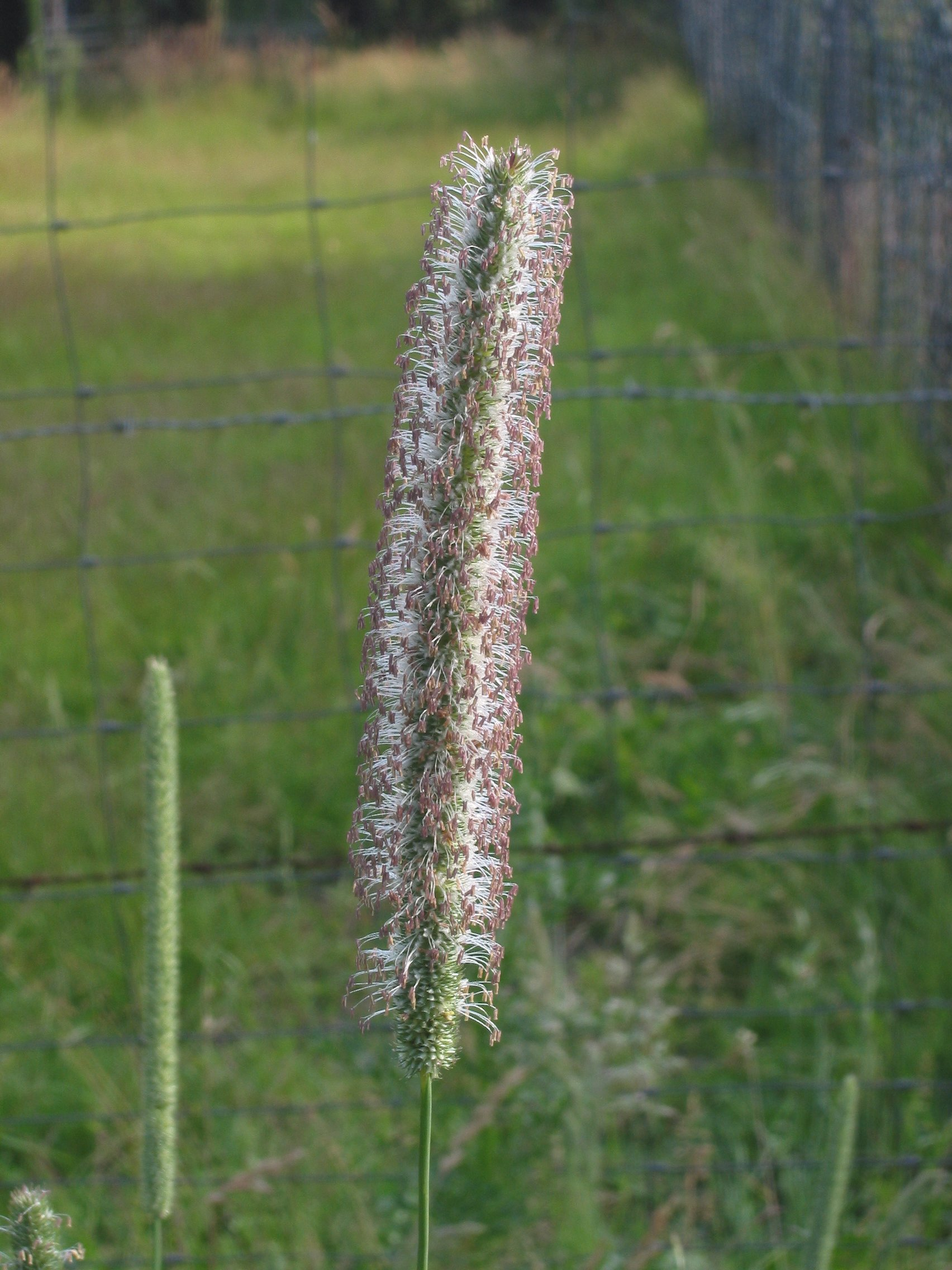
- Phleum pratense

Scientific classification
- Kingdom: Plantae
- Clade: Tracheophytes
- Clade: Angiosperms
- Clade: Monocots
- Clade: Commelinids
- Order: Poales
- Family: Poaceae
- Subfamily: Pooideae
- Supertribe: Poodae
- Tribe: Poeae
- Subtribe: Phleinae; Dumort.
- Genus: Phleum; L.

Type species
- Phleum pratense L.

Synonyms
- Stelephuros Adans.; Plantinia Bubani; Achnodonton P.Beauv.; Chilochloa P.Beauv.; Achnodon Link; Maillea Parl.; Pseudophleum Dogan

= Phleum =

Genus of grasses

Phleum (common name timothy) is a genus of annual and perennial plants in the grass family. The genus is native to Europe, Asia and north Africa, with one species (P. alpinum) also in North and South America.

They are tufted grasses growing to 20–150 cm tall, with cylindrical, spike-like panicles containing many densely packed spikelets.

Species

- Phleum alpinum – subarctic and mountainous areas in Eurasia, the Americas, South Georgia, etc.
- Phleum arenarium – western + southern Europe; Mediterranean
- Phleum bertolonii - Europe, Middle East
- Phleum boissieri - southwest Asia
- Phleum × brueggeri - France, Switzerland
- Phleum crypsoides - Sardinia, Greece, Cyprus
- Phleum echinatum - Italy, Greece, Balkans, Crimea
- Phleum exaratum - from Italy to Uzbekistan
- Phleum gibbum - Turkey
- Phleum himalaicum - Afghanistan, Pakistan, Kashmir
- Phleum hirsutum - central Europe, Balkans, Ukraine, Caucasus
- Phleum iranicum - Iran
- Phleum montanum - from Balkans to Iran
- Phleum paniculatum - from Spain to Japan
- Phleum phleoides – from Portugal + Morocco to eastern Siberia
- Phleum pratense – Timothy – from Portugal + Morocco to central Asia; naturalized in East Asia, the Americas, etc.
- Phleum subulatum - from Portugal to Pakistan
- Phleum × viniklarii - Dalmatia

Formerly included

Numerous species now considered better suited to other genera: Aegilops, Alopecurus, Beckmannia, Crypsis, Cynodon, Cynosurus, Digitaria, Elytrophorus, Ischaemum, Mnesithea, Muhlenbergia, Pennisetum, Pentameris, Phalaris, Polypogon, Polytrias, Sesleria, Tribolium

== Cultivation and uses ==
Several species are important for cattle feed and as hay for horses and other domestic animals.
