= ATC code V01 =

ATC code V01 Allergens is a therapeutic subgroup of the Anatomical Therapeutic Chemical Classification System, a system of alphanumeric codes developed by the World Health Organization (WHO) for the classification of drugs and other medical products. Subgroup V01 is part of the anatomical group V Various.

Codes for veterinary use (ATCvet codes) can be created by placing the letter Q in front of the human ATC code: for example, QV01.
National versions of the ATC classification may include additional codes not present in this list, which follows the WHO version.

== V01A Allergens ==
=== V01AA Allergen extracts ===
V01AA01 Feather
V01AA02 Grass pollen
V01AA03 House dust mites
V01AA04 Mould fungus and yeast fungus
V01AA05 Tree pollen
V01AA07 Insects
V01AA08 Food
V01AA09 Textiles
V01AA10 Flowers
V01AA11 Animals
V01AA20 Various
