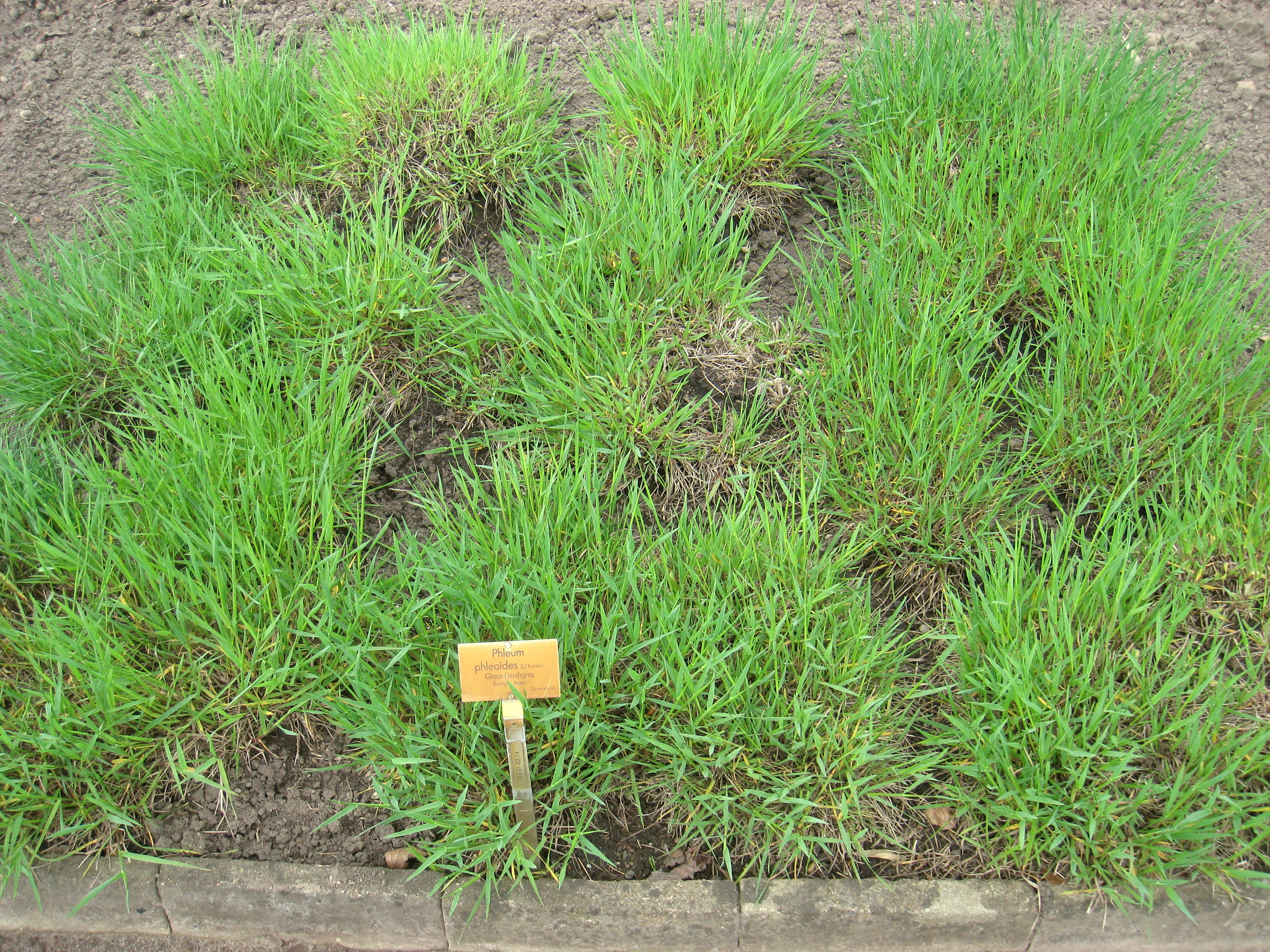

Scientific classification
- Kingdom: Plantae
- Clade: Tracheophytes
- Clade: Angiosperms
- Clade: Monocots
- Clade: Commelinids
- Order: Poales
- Family: Poaceae
- Subfamily: Pooideae
- Genus: Phleum
- Species: P. phleoides

Binomial name
- Phleum phleoides (L.) H. Karst.

= Phleum phleoides =

Species of grass

Phleum phleoides (common names: Boehmer's cat's-tail and purple-stem cat's-tail) is a perennial grass native to most of Europe, North Africa, and temperate Asia. Culms are erect and 10–70 centimetres (3.9–27.6 in) in height; leaf blades are 5–12 centimetres (2.0–4.7 in) long by 1–3.5 millimetres (0.039–0.138 in) wide.

It can be confused with related species Timothy-grass, Phleum pratense. However purple-stem cat's-tail prefers lighter soils and grows on chalk downland.
