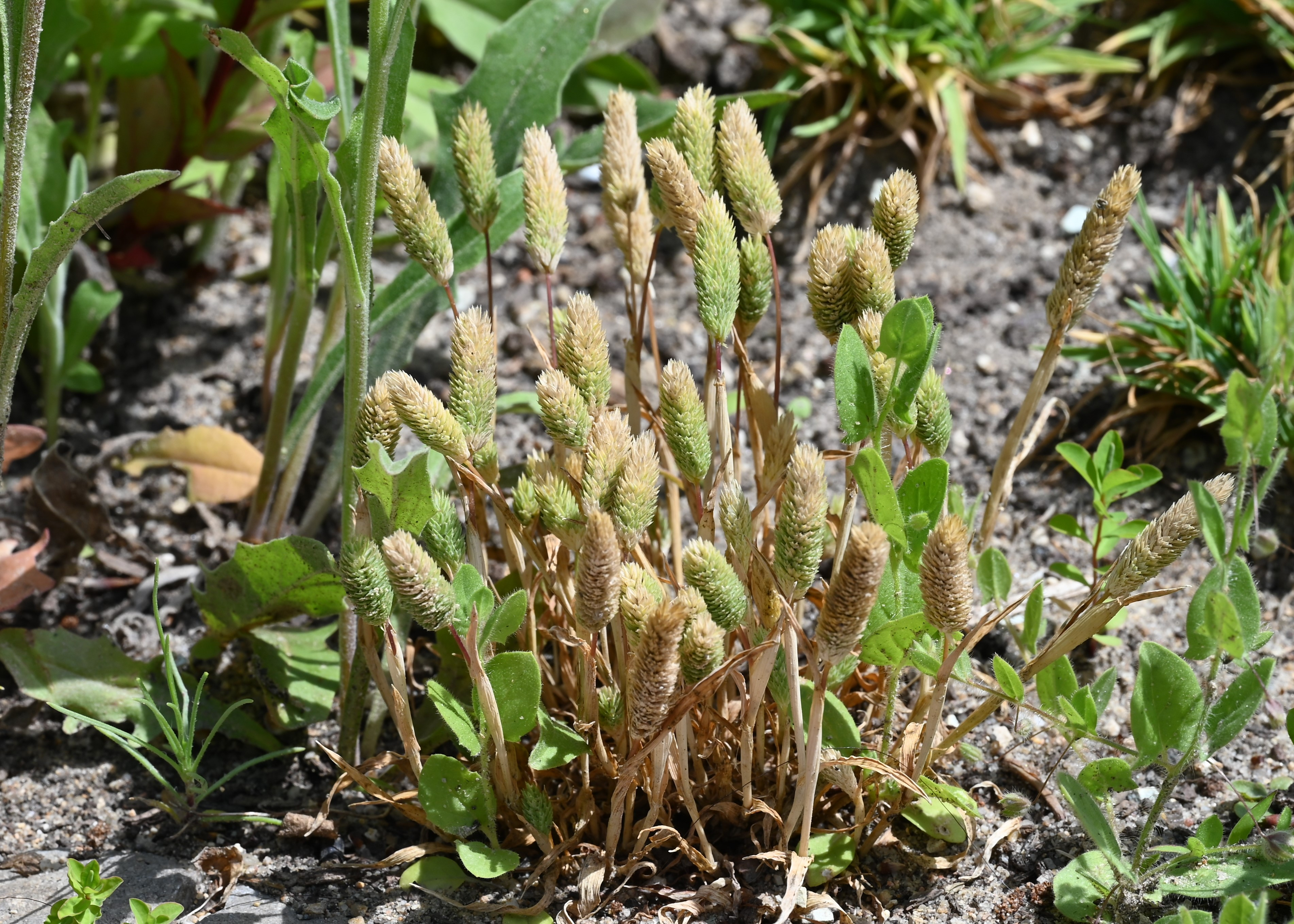
- At the Berlin Botanical Garden and Botanical Museum
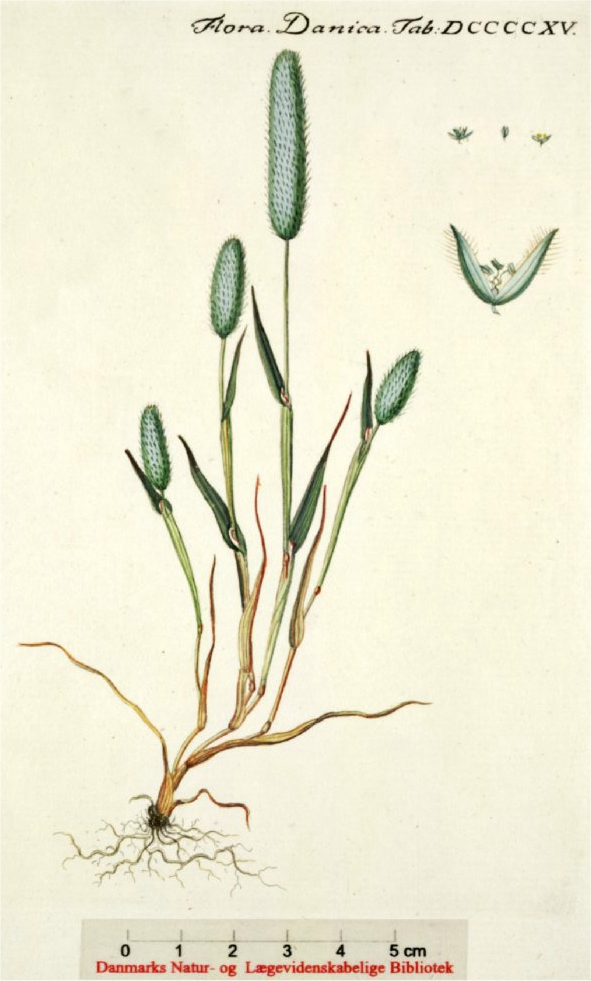
- Botanical illustration

Scientific classification
- Kingdom: Plantae
- Clade: Embryophytes
- Clade: Tracheophytes
- Clade: Angiosperms
- Clade: Monocots
- Clade: Commelinids
- Order: Poales
- Family: Poaceae
- Subfamily: Pooideae
- Genus: Phleum
- Species: P. arenarium

Binomial name
- Phleum arenarium L.

Synonyms
- List: Achnodon arenarius (L.) Link; Achnodonton arenarium (L.) Trin.; Chilochloa arenaria (L.) P.Beauv.; Crypsis arenaria (L.) Desf.; Phalaris arenaria (L.) Huds.; Phalaris phleoides Steud.; Phalaris phleoides var. arenaria (L.) Aiton; Phleum arenarium subsp. caesium H.Scholz; Phleum arenarium f. filiformis Bolzon; Phleum arenarium f. majus Bolzon; Phleum arenarium f. minor Bolzon; Plantinia arenaria (L.) Bubani; Poa arenaria (L.) Willd. ex Spreng.

= Phleum arenarium =

Species of plant

Phleum arenarium, the sand cat's tail or sand timothy, is a species of flowering plant in the grass family Poaceae. It is native to Europe, Morocco, and the Levant, and it has been introduced to a number of locales around the world; the U.S. states of Massachusetts, New Jersey, New York, and Oregon, Primorsky Krai, and Western Australia. An annual, it is typically found in coastal dunes and other sandy areas. It is occasionally available from commercial suppliers.
