= List of Acer species =

List of species of plant in the genus Acer

There are nearly 160 species in the genus Acer. Species with evergreen foliage are tagged #. Species and sections that are extinct are tagged with †.

== Species A–Z ==
The following is a list of accepted species ordered alphabetically. Living species are from the Plants of the World Online database, which is maintained by Kew Botanical Garden in London, with additions of extinct species from paleobotanical literature.

=== A ===
- Acer acuminatum Wall. ex D.Don
- Acer acutum W.P.Fang
- †Acer alaskense Wolfe & Tanai
- Acer albopurpurascens Hayata
- †Acer alvordense Axelrod
- Acer amamiense Yamazaki
- Acer amplum Rehder
- Acer argutum Maxim.
- †Acer ashwilli Wolfe & Tanai
- †Acer axelrodi Wolfe & Tanai

=== B ===
- Acer barbinerve Maxim.
- †Acer beckeri Wolfe & Tanai
- †Acer becki Wolfe & Tanai
- †Acer beckianum Prakash & Barghoorn, 1961
- Acer binzayedii Y.L.Vargas-Rodr.
- †Acer bolanderi Lesquereux
- †Acer bosrivularis Wolfe & Tanai
- Acer brevipes Gagnep., 1950
- †Acer browni Wolfe & Tanai
- Acer buergerianum Miq.

=== C ===
- †Acer cadaver Wolfe & Tanai
- Acer caesium Wall. ex Brandis
- Acer calcaratum Gagnep.
- Acer campbellii Hook.f. & Thomson ex Hiern
- Acer campestre L.
- Acer capillipes Maxim.
- Acer cappadocicum Gled.
- Acer carpinifolium Siebold & Zucc.
- †Acer cascadense Wolfe & Tanai
- †Acer castorrivularis Wolfe & Tanai
- Acer caudatifolium Hayata
- Acer caudatum Wall.
- †Acer chaneyi Knowlton
- Acer chiangdaoense Santisuk
- Acer chienii Hu & W.C.Cheng
- Acer chingii Hu
- Acer chunii W.P.Fang
- Acer cinerascentiforme Pojark.
- Acer circinatum Pursh
- Acer cissifolium (Siebold & Zucc.) K.Koch
- †Acer clarnoense Wolfe & Tanai
- †Acer collawashense Wolfe & Tanai
- Acer confertifolium Merr. & F.P.Metcalf
- Acer cordatum Pax
- Acer coriaceifolium H.Lév.
- Acer × coriaceum Bosc ex Tausch.
- †Acer cranei Wolfe & Tanai
- Acer crassum Hu & W.C.Cheng
- Acer crataegifolium Siebold & Zucc.
- †Acer crookense Wolfe & Tanai
- †Acer cuprovallis Wolfe & Tanai

=== D ===
- Acer davidii Franch.
- †Acer dettermani Wolfe & Tanai
- Acer diabolicum Blume ex K.Koch
- Acer distylum Siebold & Zucc.
- †Acer douglasense Wolfe & Tanai
- Acer duplicatoserratum Hayata

=== E ===
- †Acer elkanum Wolfe & Tanai
- †Acer elwyni (Becker) Wolfe & Tanai
- †Acer eomedianum Wolfe & Tanai
- Acer elegantulum W.P.Fang & P.L.Chiu
- †Acer eonegundo Wolfe & Tanai
- Acer erianthum Schwer.
- Acer erythranthum Gagnep.
- †Acer ezoanum Oishi et Huzioka

=== F ===
- Acer fabri Hance
- Acer fenzelianum Hand.-Mazz.
- †Acer ferrignoi Wolfe & Tanai
- Acer floridanum (Chapm.) Pax
- †Acer florissanti Kirchner
- Acer forrestii Diels
- Acer × freemanii A.E.Murray
- Acer fulvescens Rehder

=== G ===
- †Acer glabroides R.W. Brown
- Acer glabrum Torr.
- Acer gracilifolium W.P.Fang & C.C.Fu
- Acer granatense Boiss.
- Acer grandidentatum Nutt.
- †Acer grantense Wolfe & Tanai
- Acer griseum (Franch.) Pax

=== H ===
- Acer heldreichii Orph. ex Boiss.
- Acer henryi Pax
- †Acer heterodentatum (Chaney) MacGinitie
- Acer hilaense Hu & W.C.Cheng
- †Acer hillsi Wolfe & Tanai
- †Acer hueberi Wolfe & Tanai
- Acer hyrcanum Fisch. & C.A.Mey.

=== I ===
- †Acer idahoense Wolfe & Tanai
- Acer insulare Makino
- Acer iranicum Mohtash. & Rastegar
- †Acer ivanofense Wolfe & Tanai

=== J ===
- Acer × jakelyanum Rottenst.
- Acer japonicum Thunb.
- Acer jarbidgianum Wolfe & Tanai

=== K ===
- †Acer kenaicum Wolfe & Tanai
- †Acer kluckingi Wolfe & Tanai
- †Acer knolli Wolfe & Tanai
- Acer × koenighoferae Rottenst.
- Acer komarovii Pojark.
- Acer kungshanense W.P.Fang & C.Y.Chang
- Acer kuomeii W.P.Fang & M.Y.Fang
- Acer kwangnanense Hu & W.C.Cheng
- Acer kweilinense W.P.Fang & M.Y.Fang

=== L ===
- Acer laevigatum Wall.
- †Acer latahense Wolfe & Tanai
- Acer laurinum Hassk.
- Acer laxiflorum Pax
- Acer leipoense W.P.Fang & Soong
- Acer leptophyllum W.P.Fang
- Acer leucoderme Small
- †Acer lincolnense Wolfe & Tanai
- Acer lobelii Ten.
- Acer longipes Franch. ex Rehder
- Acer lucidum F.P.Metcalf
- Acer lungshengense W.P.Fang & L.C.Hu

=== M ===
- †Acer macginitiei Wolfe & Tanai
- Acer macrophyllum Pursh
- †Acer manchesteri Wolfe & Tanai
- Acer mandshuricum Maxim.
- Acer mapienense W.P.Fang
- Acer × martini Jord.
- Acer maximowiczianum Miq.
- Acer maximowiczii Pax
- Acer mazandaranicum Amini, H.Zare & Assadi
- †Acer medianum Knowlton
- †Acer megasamarum Tanai & Onoe
- Acer metcalfii Rehder
- †Acer meyeri Wolfe & Tanai
- Acer miaoshanicum W.P.Fang
- Acer micranthum Siebold & Zucc.
- †Acer milleri Wolfe & Tanai
- †Acer minutifolium Chaney
- Acer miyabei Maxim.
- †Acer molallense Wolfe & Tanai
- Acer monspessulanum L.
- †Acer montanense Wolfe & Tanai
- Acer morifolium Koidz.

=== N ===
- †Acer negundoides MacGinitie
- Acer negundo L.
- Acer nigrum F.Michx.
- †Acer niklasi Wolfe & Tanai
- Acer nipponicum H.Hara

=== O ===
- Acer oblongum Wall. ex DC.
- Acer obtusifolium Sm.
- Acer okamotoanum Nakai
- Acer oligocarpum W.P.Fang & L.C.Hu
- †Acer oligomedianum Wolfe & Tanai
- Acer oliverianum Pax
- Acer opalus Mill.
- †Acer orbum LaMotte
- †Acer oregonianum Knowlton
- Acer orthocampestre G.W.Grimm & Denk
- Acer × osmastonii Gamble
- †Acer osmonti Knowlton
- †Acer ovipetrinum Wolfe & Tanai

=== P ===
- Acer paihengii W.P.Fang
- †Acer palaeorufinerve Tanai & Onoe
- Acer palmatum Thunb.
- Acer pauciflorum W.P.Fang
- Acer paxii Franch.
- Acer pectinatum Wall. ex Brandis
- Acer pensylvanicum L.
- Acer pentaphyllum Diels
- Acer pentapomicum J.L.Stewart
- Acer pictum Thunb.
- Acer pilosum Maxim.
- Acer platanoides L.
- Acer poliophyllum W.P.Fang & Y.T.Wu
- †Acer powellense Tanai & Onoe
- †Acer postense Tanai & Onoe
- †Acer protomiyabi Endo
- †Acer princetonese Tanai & Onoe
- Acer pseudoplatanus L.
- Acer pseudosieboldianum (Pax) Kom.
- Acer pseudowilsonii Y.S.Chen
- Acer pubinerve Rehder
- Acer pubipetiolatum Hu & W.C.Cheng
- Acer pycnanthum K.Koch

=== R ===
- Acer × ramosum Schwer.
- †Acer republicense Wolfe & Tanai
- Acer robustum Pax
- †Acer rousei Wolfe & Tanai
- Acer rubrum L.
- Acer rufinerve Siebold & Zuccarini

=== S ===
- Acer saccharinum L.
- Acer saccharum Marshall (sugar maple)
- †Acer salmonense Wolfe & Tanai
- †Acer schorni Wolfe & Tanai
- Acer × schwerinii Pax
- †Acer scottiae MacGinitie
- Acer sempervirens L.
- †Acer septilobatum Oliver
- Acer serrulatum Hayata
- Acer shangszeense W.P.Fang & Soong
- Acer shenkanense W.P.Fang ex C.C.Fu
- Acer shenzhenensis R.H.Miao & X.M.Wang
- Acer shihweii F.Chun & W.P.Fang
- Acer shirasawanum Koidz.
- Acer sieboldianum Miq.
- Acer sikkimense Miq.
- Acer sino-oblongum F.P.Metcalf
- Acer sinopurpurascens W.C.Cheng
- †Acer sinuofluviatilis Wolfe & Tanai
- Acer skutchii Rehder
- †Acer smileyi Wolfe & Tanai
- Acer sosnowskyi Doluch.
- Acer spicatum Lam.
- †Acer spitzi Wolfe & Tanai
- Acer stachyophyllum Hiern
- Acer sterculiaceum Wall.
- †Acer stewarti Wolfe & Tanai
- †Acer stockeyae Wolfe & Tanai
- †Acer stonebergae Wolfe & Tanai
- Acer sutchuenense Franch.
- Acer sycopseoides Chun

=== T ===
- †Acer taggarti Wolfe & Tanai
- Acer tataricum L.
  - Acer tataricum subsp. aidzuense (Franch.) P.C.de Jong
  - Acer tataricum subsp. ginnala (Maxim.) Wesm.
  - Acer tataricum subsp. semenovii (Regel & Herder) A.E.Murray
  - Acer tataricum subsp. tataricum
  - Acer tataricum subsp. theiferum (W.P.Fang) Y.S.Chen & P.C.de Jong
- †Acer taurocursum Wolfe & Tanai
- Acer tegmentosum Maxim.
- Acer tenellum Pax
- Acer tenuifolium (Koidz.) Koidz.
- Acer thomsonii Miq.
- Acer tibetense W.P.Fang
- †Acer tiffneyi Wolfe & Tanai
- †Acer tigilense Chelebaeva
- Acer tonkinense Lecomte
- †Acer toradense Wolfe & Tanai
- †Acer traini Wolfe & Tanai
- Acer triflorum Kom.
- Acer truncatum Bunge
- Acer tschonoskii Maxim.
- Acer tsinglingense W.P.Fang & C.C.Hsieh
- Acer tutcheri Duthie
- †Acer tyrellense Smiley

=== U–Z ===
- Acer ukurunduense Trautv. & C.A.Mey.
- Acer undulatum Pojark.
- Acer × varbossanium (K.Malý) Simonk.
- Acer velutinum Boiss.
- Acer wangchii W.P.Fang
- Acer wardii W.W.Sm.
- †Acer washingtonense Wolfe & Tanai
- †Acer wehri Wolfe & Tanai
- †Acer whitebirdense (Ashlee) Wolfe & Tanai
- Acer wilsonii Rehder
- Acer yangbiense Y.S.Chen & Q.E.Yang
- Acer yinkunii W.P.Fang
- Acer yui W.P.Fang
- Acer zarei Amini

== Species listed by section and series ==
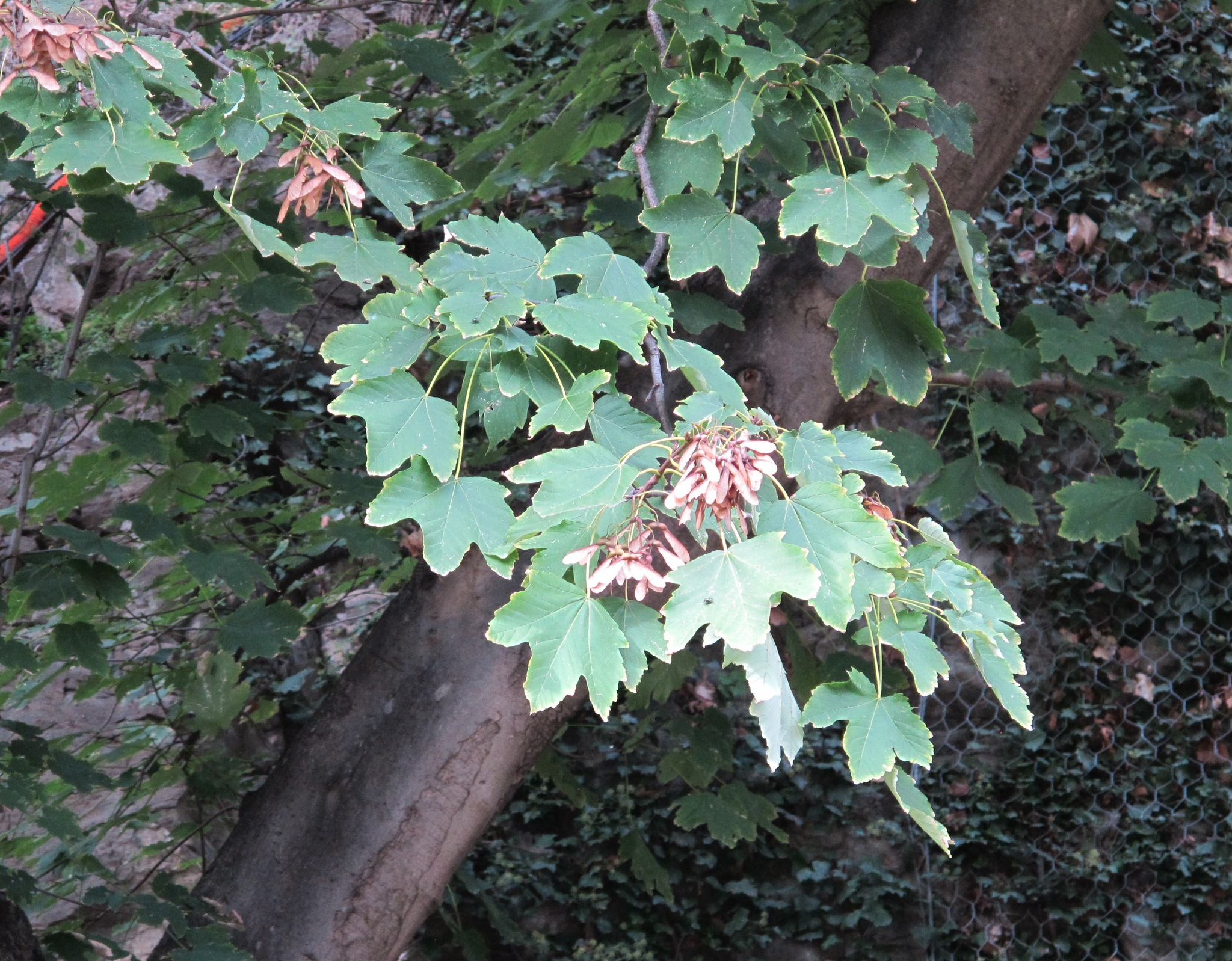
Velvet maple (Acer velutinum)

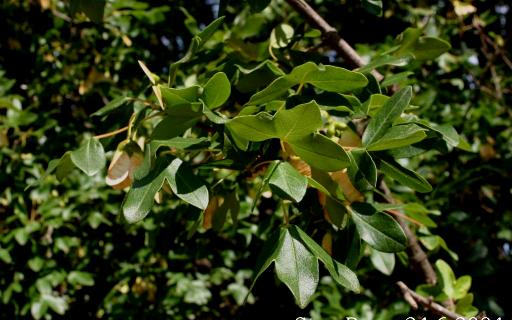
Montpellier maple (Acer monspessulanum)

Infrageneric classification of extant species follows The Maple Society (E. Davis), 2021.

=== Section Acer ===
- Series Acer
  - Acer caesium Wall. ex Brandis
  - Acer heldreichii Orph. ex Boiss.
  - Acer pseudoplatanus L.
  - Acer sosnowskyi Duloch
  - Acer velutinum Boiss.
  - Acer yangbiense Chen & Yang
- Series Monspessulana
  - Acer granatense Boissier
  - Acer hyrcanum Fisch. & Meyer
  - Acer iranicum Mohtashamian & Rastegar
  - Acer mazandaranicum H.Zare & Assad
  - Acer monspessulanum L.
  - Acer obtusifolium Sibthorp & Smith
  - Acer opalus Miller
  - Acer sempervirens L.
  - Acer undulatum Pojark
- Series Saccharodendron
  - Acer binzayedii Vargas-Rodriguez
  - Acer floridanum (Chapm.) Pax
  - Acer grandidentatum Torr. & Gray
  - Acer leucoderme Small
  - Acer nigrum Michx.f.
  - Acer saccharum Marshall
  - Acer skutchii Rehder

=== Section Arguta ===
- Acer acuminatum Wall. ex D.Don
- Acer argutum Maxim. – deep-veined maple
- Acer barbinerve Maxim. – bearded maple
- Acer stachyophyllum Hiern – birch-leaved maple

=== Section Ginnala ===
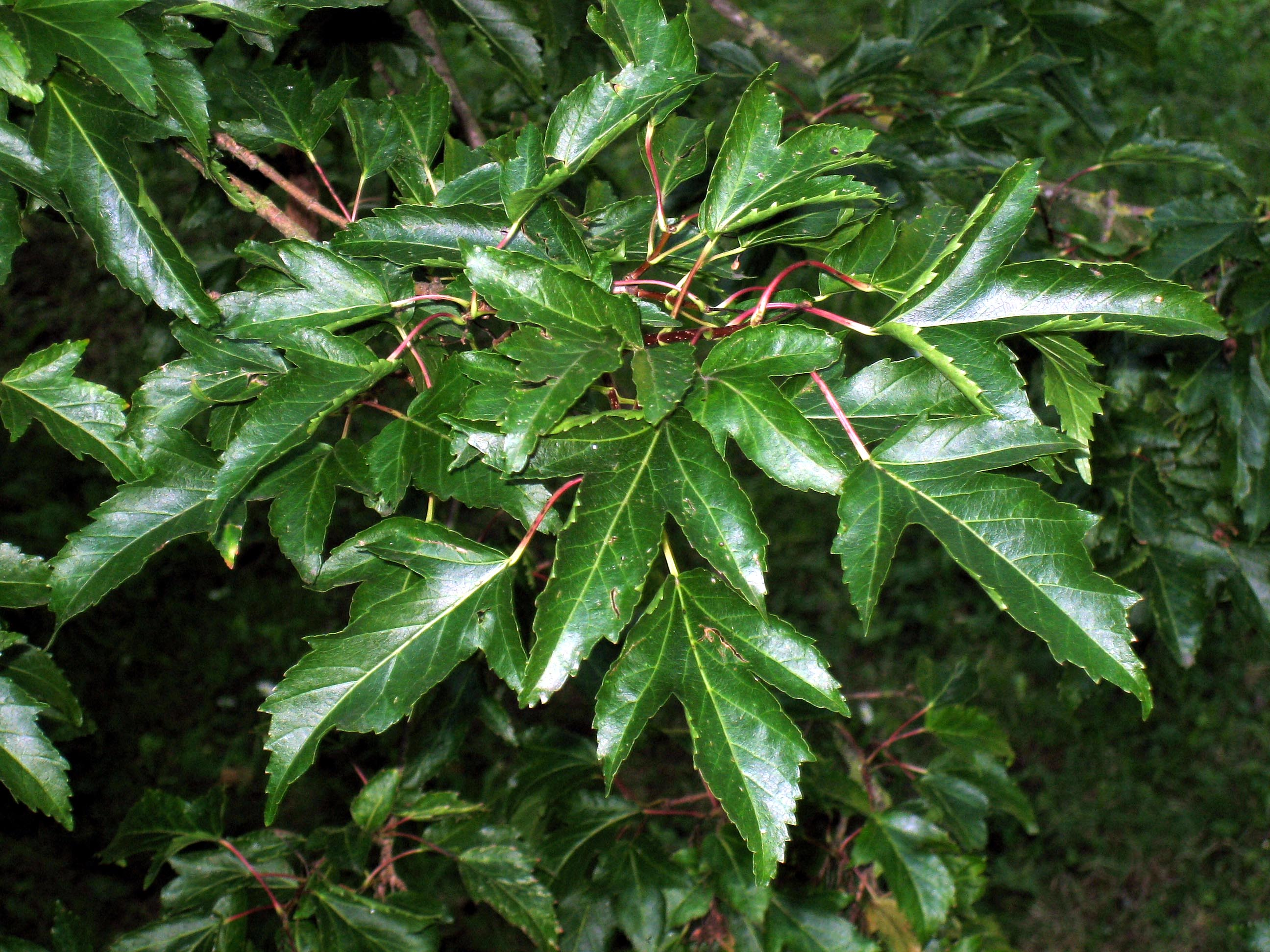
Amur maple (Acer ginnala)

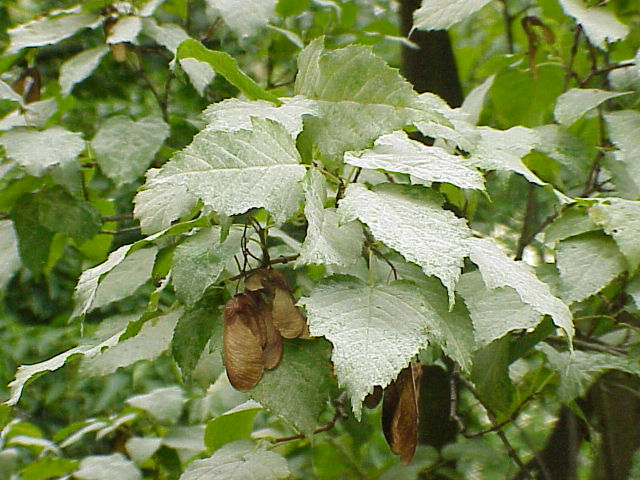
Tatar maple (Acer tataricum)

- Acer ginnala Maxim. – Amur maple
- Acer tataricum L. – Tatar maple

=== Section Glabra ===
- Series Glabra
  - Acer glabrum Torr. – Douglas maple, Rocky Mountain maple, Greene's maple, New Mexico maple, Torrey maple

=== Section Indivisa ===
- Series Indivisa
  - Acer carpinifolium Siebold & Zucc. – hornbeam maple

=== Section Lithocarpa ===
- Series Lithocarpa
  - Acer diabolicum Blume ex Koch – horned maple
  - Acer kungshanense W. P. Fang & C. Y. Chang
  - Acer leipoense Fang & Soong
  - Acer lungshengense W. P. Fang & L. C. Hu
  - Acer sinopurpurascens Cheng
  - Acer sterculiaceum Wall. – Franchet’s maple, Himalayan maple
  - Acer thomsonii Miquel
  - Acer tsinglingense W. P. Fang & C. C. Hsieh

=== Section Macrantha ===
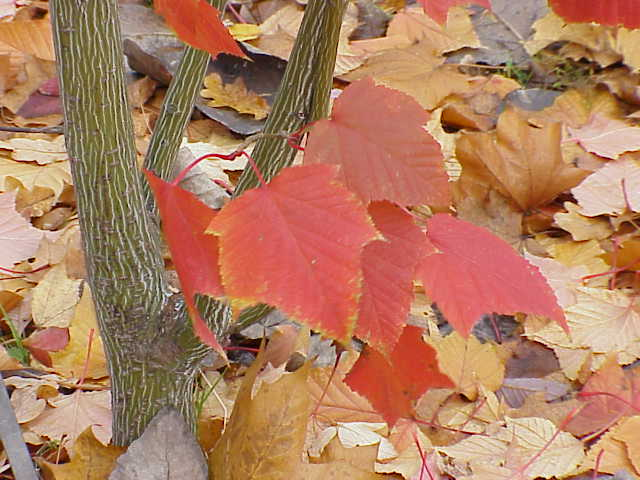
Red snakebark maple (Acer capillipes)

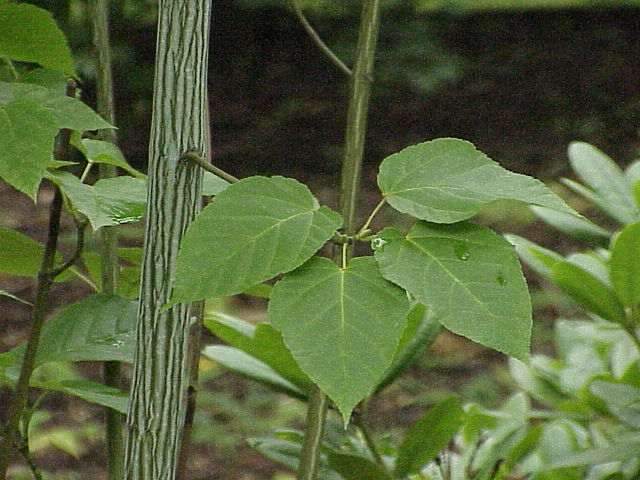
Acer davidii subsp. grosseri

- Acer capillipes Maxim.
- †Acer castorrivularis Wolfe & Tanai (Late Eocene, Beaver Creek Flora)
- Acer caudatifolium Hayata
- Acer chienii Hu & Cheng
- Acer crataegifolium Siebold & Zucc.
- Acer davidii Franch.
- Acer forrestii Diels
- Acer hookeri Miq.
- Acer insulare Makino
- Acer kawakamii Koidz.
- Acer komarovii Pojark in Komarov
- Acer laxiflorum Pax in Engler
- Acer maximowiczii Pax
- Acer metcalfii Rehder
- Acer micranthum Siebold & Zucc.
- Acer morifolium Koidz.
- Acer pectinatum Wall. ex Nicholson
- Acer pensylvanicum L.
- Acer rubescens Hayata
- Acer rufinerve Siebold & Zucc.
- Acer sikkimense Miq.
- Acer tegmentosum Maxim.
- Acer tschonoskii Murray

=== Section Macrophylla ===
- Acer macrophyllum Pursh – Oregon maple, bigleaf maple

=== Section Negundo ===
- Series Negundo
  - Acer negundo L. – box elder, boxelder maple, Manitoba maple
- Series Cissifolia
  - Acer cissifolium (Siebold & Zucc.) Koch
  - Acer henryi Pax

=== Section Palmata ===
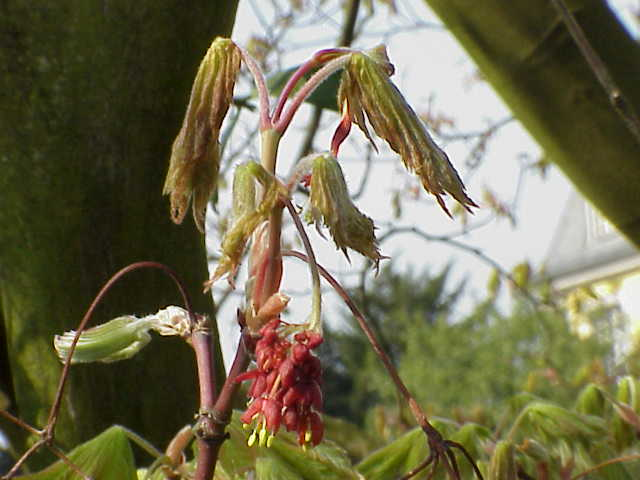
Fullmoon maple (Acer japonicum)

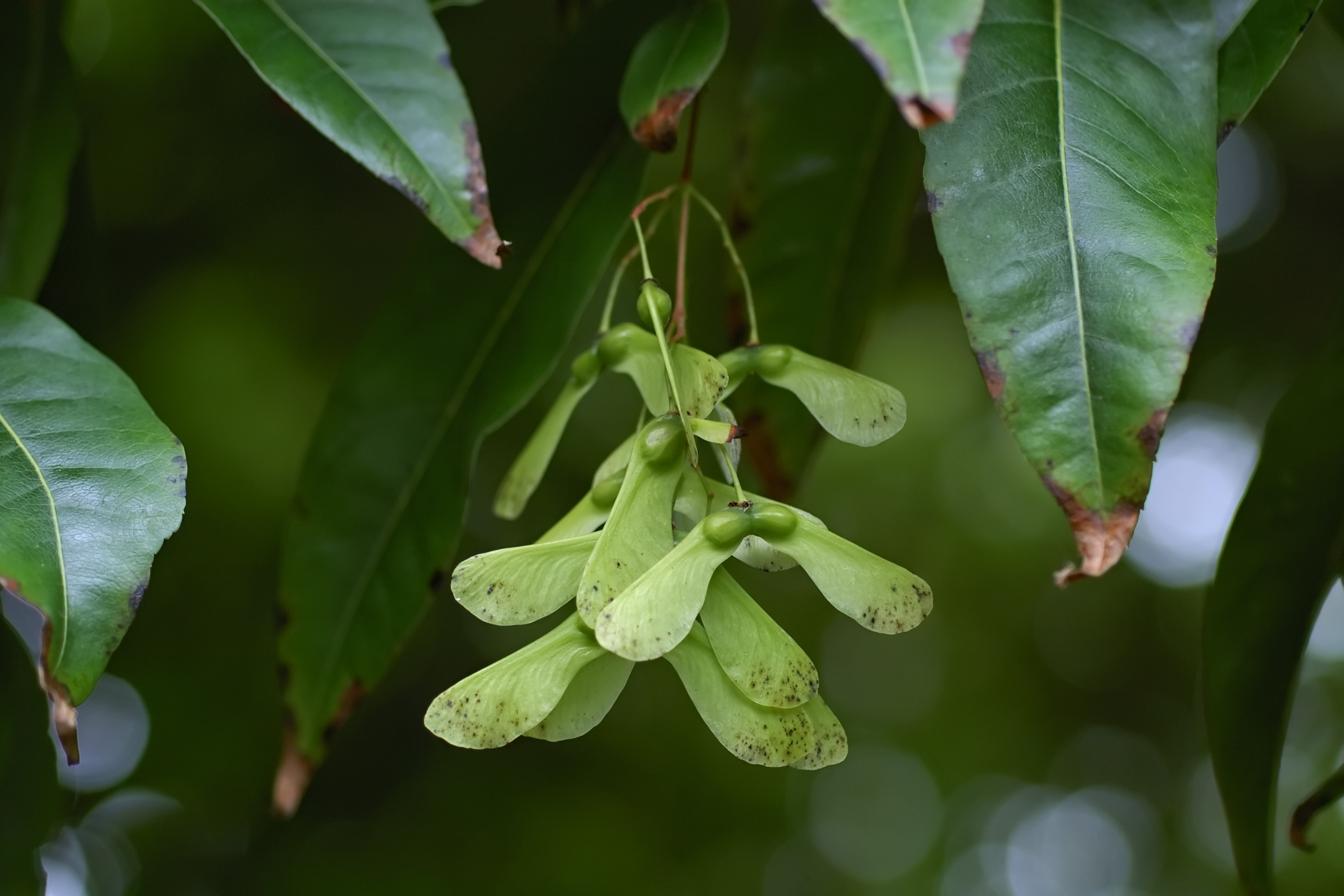
Acer laevigatum seeds

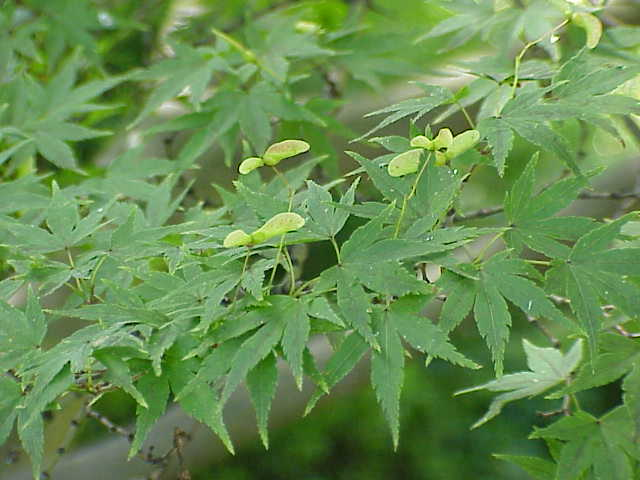
Japanese maple (Acer palmatum)

- Series Palmata
  - Acer amoenum (Carriere) Hara
  - Acer anhweiense Fang & Fang f.
  - Acer calcaratum Gagnep.
  - Acer campbellii Hook.f. & Thomson ex Hiern – Campbell's maple
  - Acer chingii Hu
  - Acer circinatum Pursh – vine maple
  - Acer confertifolium Merril & Metcalf
  - Acer duplicatoserratum Hayata
  - Acer elegantulum Fang & Chiu
  - Acer erianthum Schwer.
  - Acer fenzelianum Hand.-Mazz. – Fenzl's maple
  - Acer flabellatum Rehder
  - Acer heptaphlebium Gagnepain
  - Acer japonicum Thunb. – downy Japanese maple
  - Acer kuomeii Fang & Fang f.
  - Acer kweilinense Fang & Fang f.
  - Acer miaoshanicum Fang
  - Acer oliverianum Pax – Oliver's maple
  - Acer osmastonii Gamble
  - Acer palmatum Thunb. – Japanese maple
  - Acer pauciflorum Fang
  - Acer pseudosieboldianum (Pax) Komarov - Korean maple
  - Acer pseudowilsonii Y.S.Chen
  - Acer pubinerve Rehder
  - Acer pubipalmatum Fang
  - Acer robustum Pax
  - Acer serrulatum Hayata
  - Acer shirasawanum Koidz. – Shirasawa's maple
  - Acer sieboldianum Miq. – Siebold's maple
  - Acer sinense Pax – Campbell's maple
  - Acer takesimense Nakai
  - Acer tenuifolium (Koidzumi) Koidzumi
  - Acer tonkinense Lecompte
  - Acer tutcheri Duthie
  - Acer wangchii Fang
  - Acer wilsonii Rehder – Wilson's maple
- Series Penninervia
  - Acer cordatum Pax
  - Acer crassum Chu & Cheng
  - Acer erythranthum Gagnep.
  - Acer fabri Hance
  - Acer hilaense Hu & Cheng
  - Acer kwangnanense Hu & Cheng
  - Acer laevigatum Hu & Cheng – # smoothbark maple
  - Acer oligocarpum
  - Acer pubipetiolatum Hu & W.C.Cheng
  - Acer sino-oblongum Metcalf
  - Acer wangchii Fang

=== Section Parviflora ===
- Series Distyla
  - Acer distylum Siebold & Zucc. – lime-leaved maple
- Series Parviflora
  - Acer nipponicum Hara – Nippon maple

=== Section Pentaphylla ===
- Series Pentaphylla
  - Acer pentaphyllum Diels
- Series Trifida (syn Section integrifolia)
  - Acer albopurpurascens Hayata
  - Acer buergerianum Miq. – trident maple
  - Acer chiangdaoense Santisuk
  - Acer coriaceifolium Lév. - # leatherleaf maple
  - Acer gracilifolium Fang & Fu
  - Acer lucidum Metcalf
  - Acer oblongum Wall. ex DC. - #
  - Acer paihengii Fang
  - Acer paxii Franch. - #
  - Acer poliophyllum Fang & Wu
  - Acer shihweii Chun & Fang
  - Acer sycopseoides Chun
  - Acer wangchii Fang
  - Acer yinkunii Fang
  - Acer yui Fang

=== Section Platanoidea ===
- Series Platanoidea
  - Acer acutum Fang
  - Acer amplum Rehder – broad maple
  - Acer campestre L. – field maple
  - Acer cappadocicum Gled. – Cappadocian maple
  - Acer chunii Fang
  - Acer divergens Koch ex Pax
  - Acer fulvescens Rehder in Sargent
  - Acer lobelii Ten. – Lobel's maple
  - Acer longipes Franch. ex Rehder
  - Acer miaotaiense P.C.Tsoong
  - Acer miyabei Maxim. – Miyabe's maple
  - Acer okamotoanum Nakai
  - Acer pictum Thunberg
  - Acer platanoides L. – Norway maple
  - Acer shenkanense Fang ex Fu
  - Acer tenellum Pax
  - Acer tibetense Fang
  - Acer truncatum Bunge – Shandong maple
  - Acer turkestanicum Pax in Engler

=== Section Pubescentia ===
- Series Pubescentia
  - Acer pentapomicum Stewart ex Brandis
  - Acer pilosum Maximowicz

=== Section Rubra ===
- Acer laurinum Hassk. - laurel maple
- Acer pycnanthum K.Koch - Japanese red maple
- Acer rubrum L. – red maple
- Acer saccharinum L. – silver maple

=== Section Spicata ===
- Acer caudatum Wall. – tail-leaf maple
- Acer spicatum Lamarck – mountain maple
- Acer ukurunduense Trautvetter & Meyer

=== Section †Spitza ===
- †Acer spitzi Wolfe & Tanai (Early Eocene, Washington state)

=== Section Trifoliata ===
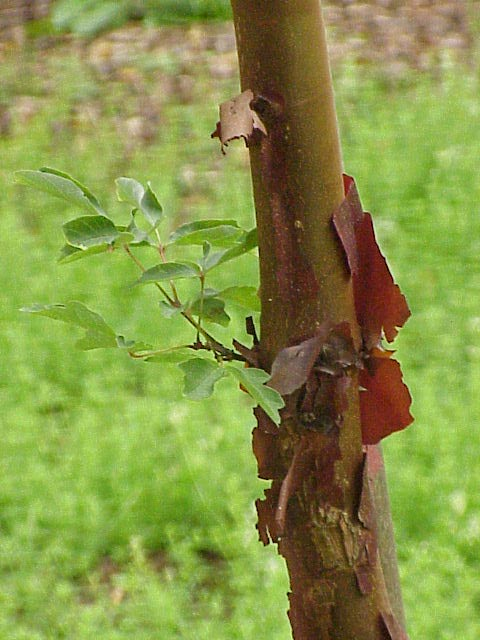
Paperbark maple (Acer griseum)

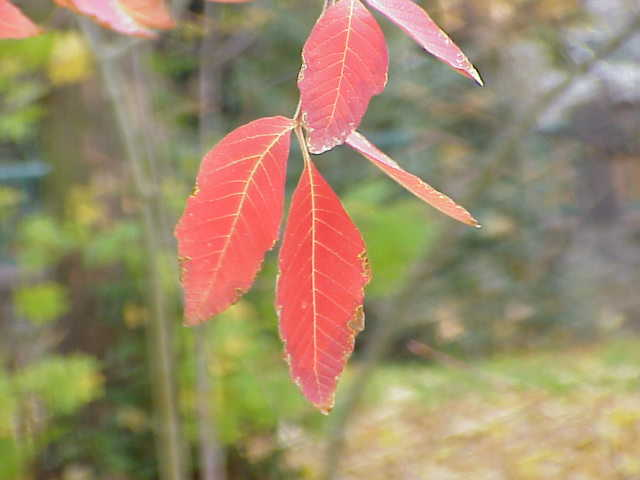
Acer maximowiczianum leaves

- Series Emeiensia
  - Acer sutchuenense Franch.
- Series Grisea
  - Acer griseum (Franch.) Pax – paperbark maple
  - Acer maximowiczianum Miq. – Nikko maple
  - Acer triflorum Komarov – three-flowered maple
- Series Mandshurica
  - Acer mandshuricum Maxim. – Manchurian maple

=== Section Wardiana ===
- Acer wardii W.W.Smith

== Hybrids ==
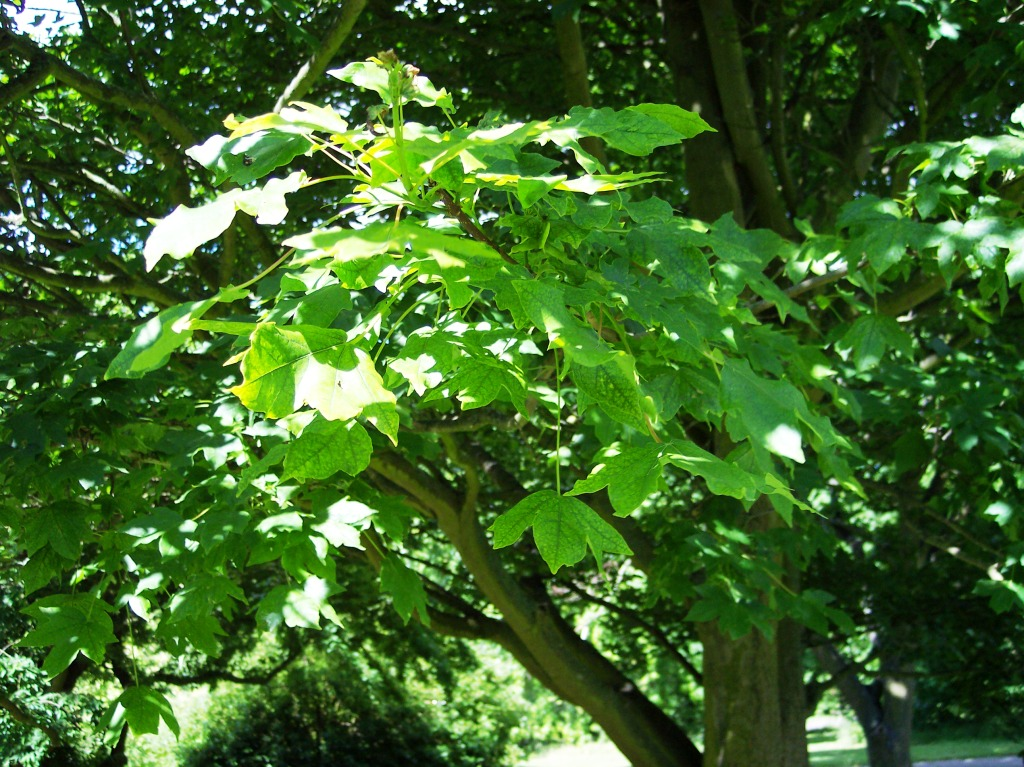
Zoeschen maple (Acer × zoeschense)

- Acer × bormuelleri Borbas (A. monspessulanum × A. campestre or A. opalus)
- Acer × boscii Spach (A. monspessulanum × A. tataricum or A. pensylvanicum × A. tataricum, possibly A. tataricum × A. campestre)
- Acer × conspicuum van Gelderen & Otterdoom (A. davidii × A. pensylvanicum)
- Acer × coriaceum Bosc ex Tausch (A. monspessulanum × A. opalus ssp. obtusatum)
- Acer × dieckii van Gelderen & Otterdoom See A. platanoides
- Acer × freemanii Murray (A. rubrum × A. saccharinum)
- Acer × hillieri Lancaster (A. miyabei × A. cappadocicum 'Aureum')
- Acer × martinii Jordan (A. monspessulanum × A. opalus)
- Acer × pseudo-heldreichii Fukarek & Celjo (A. pseudoplatanus × A. heldreichii)
- Acer × ramosum Jordan (A. monspessulanum × A. opalus)
- Acer × schwerinii Pax (uncertain, maybe A. crataegifolium × A. rufinerve)
- Acer × zoeschense Pax (A. campestre × either A. cappadocicum or A. lobelii)

== Fossil sections ==
A number of fossil sections were suggested by paleobotanists Jack Wolfe and Toshimasa Tanai in their 1987 revision of the North American fossil Acer record.

=== Macrantha Group ===
==== Section Arguta ====
- †Acer ivanofense Wolfe & Tanai (Late Eocene to Early Oligocene, Meshik Volcanics, Alaska)

==== Section Cissifolia ====
- †Acer lincolnense Wolfe & Tanai (late Eocene, Beaver Creek Flora, Montana)

==== Section Eriocarpa ====
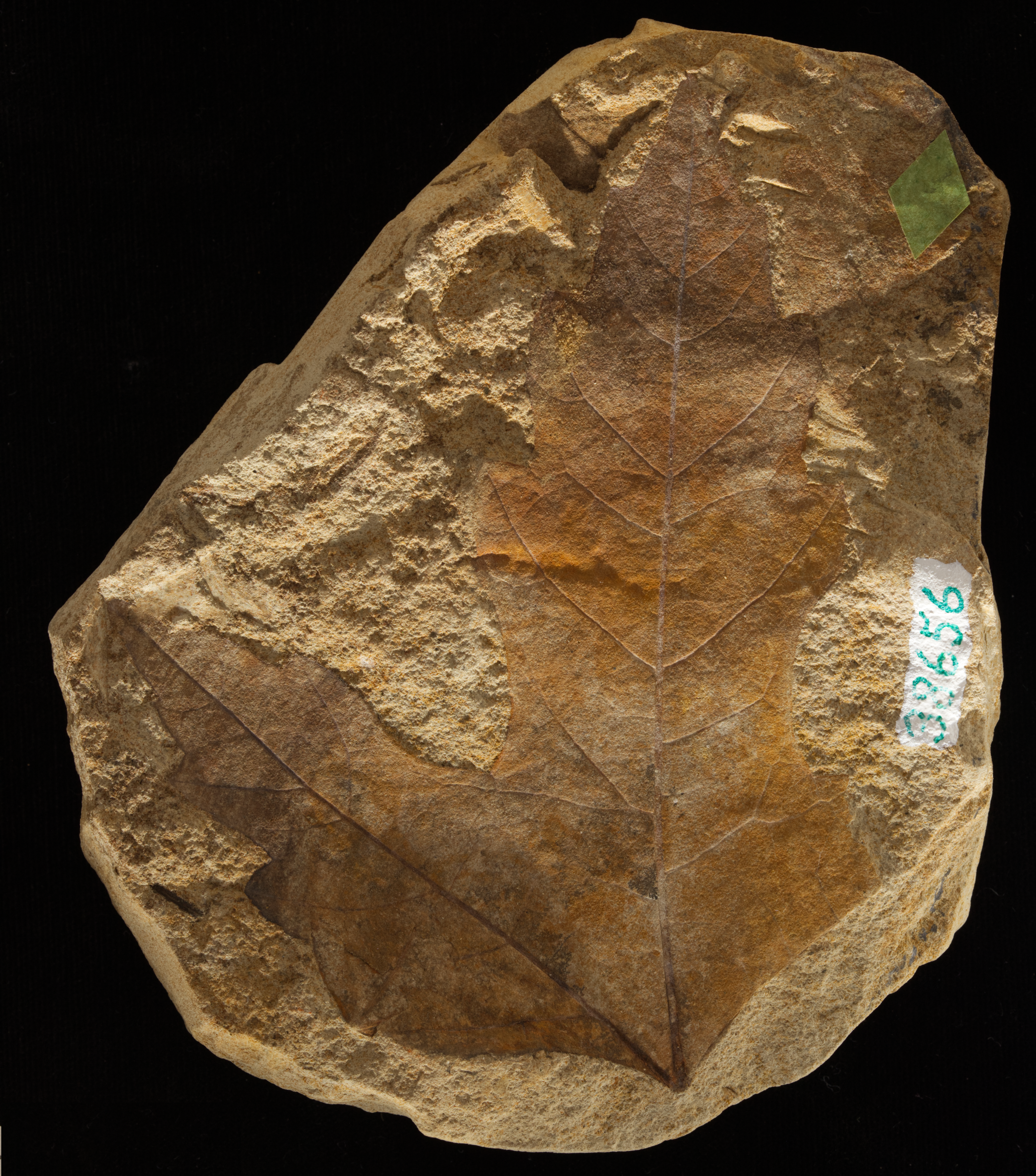
†Acer chaneyi leaf

- †Acer chaneyi Knowlton (Oligocene to Miocene, Western US)
- †Acer ezoanum Oishi et Huzioka
- †Acer ferrignoi Wolfe & Tanai (Late Miocene, Oregon)
- †Acer kenaicum Wolfe & Tanai (Oligocene, Kenai group, Alaska)
- †Acer taggarti Wolfe & Tanai (Middle Miocene, Mascall Formation, Oregon)
- †Acer taurocursum Wolfe & Tanai (Late Eocene, Bull Run, Nevada)
- †Acer whitebirdense (Ashlee) Wolfe & Tanai (Middle Miocene, Northwestern USA)

==== Section Glabra ====
- †Acer traini Wolfe & Tanai (Early to middle Miocene, Western North America)

==== Section Macrantha ====
- †Acer castorrivularis Wolfe & Tanai
- †Acer clarnoense Wolfe & Tanai (Late Eocene, John Day Formation)
- †Acer dettermani Wolfe & Tanai (Late Eocene - Early Oligocene, Meshik Volcanics)
- †Acer latahense Wolfe & Tanai (Early - Late Miocene, Latah, Mascall, and Succor Creek Formations)
- †Acer palaeorufinerve Tanai & Onoe (Miocene to Pliocene, East Asia & Alaska)

==== Section Negundo ====
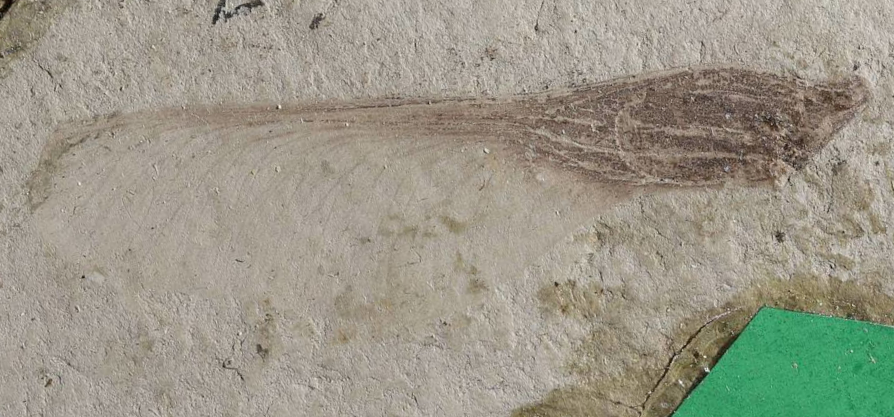
†Acer knolli samara

- †Acer cascadense Wolfe & Tanai (Oligocene, Blue Mountains, Oregon)
- †Acer cranei Wolfe & Tanai (Early Oligocene, Central Oregon)
- †Acer eonegundo Wolfe & Tanai (Middle - Late Eocene, Nevada)
- †Acer heterodentatum Wolfe & Tanai (Early-Middle Miocene, Alaska & Oregon)
- †Acer knolli Wolfe & Tanai (Miocene, Latah Formation)
- †Acer macginitiei Wolfe & Tanai (Late Eocene, Montana - Colorado)
- †Acer molallense Wolfe & Tanai (Oligocene or Early Miocene, Oregon)
- †Acer negundoides Wolfe & Tanai (Early - Late Eocene, Pacific Coast & Great Basin)
- †Acer sinuofluviatilis Wolfe & Tanai (Early Oligocene, Central Oregon)

==== Section †Republica ====
- †Acer republicense Wolfe & Tanai (Early Eocene, Washington state)

==== Section Rubra ====
- †Acer kluckingi Wolfe & Tanai (Early Oligocene, Central Oregon)
- †Acer ovipetrinum Wolfe & Tanai (Early Oligocene, Central Oregon)
- †Acer tigilense Chelebaeva (Late Oligocene - Middle Miocene, Russia, Alaska, Pacific Northwest)

==== Section Trilobata ====
- †Acer ashwilli Wolfe & Tanai (Early Oligocene, Central Oregon)

=== Macrophylla Group ===
==== Section Acer ====
===== Series Acer =====
- †Acer montanense Wolfe & Tanai
- †Acer postense Wolfe & Tanai

===== Series Saccharodendron =====
- †Acer bolanderi Lesquereux
- †Acer collawashense Wolfe & Tanai
- †Acer minutifolium Chaney
- †Acer schorni Wolfe & Tanai
- †Acer tyrellense Smiley

==== Section Lithocarpa ====
- Acer beckeri Wolfe & Tanai
- Acer grantense Wolfe & Tanai

==== Section Macrophylla ====
- Acer alvordense Axelrod
- Acer busamarum Wolfe & Tanai
- Acer megasamarum Tanai & Ohno
- Acer oregonianum Knowlton
- Acer osmonti Knowlton
- Acer salmonense Wolfe & Tanai

==== Section †Princetona ====
- †Acer princetonese Wolfe & Tanai

==== Section †Spitza ====
- Acer spitzi Wolfe & Tanai

=== Orba Group ===
==== Section †Columbiana ====
- †Acer eomedianum Wolfe & Tanai
- †Acer medianum Knowlton
- †Acer niklasi Wolfe & Tanai
- †Acer oligomedianum Wolfe & Tanai
- †Acer powellense Wolfe & Tanai
- †Acer stockeyae Wolfe & Tanai

==== Section †Glabroidea ====
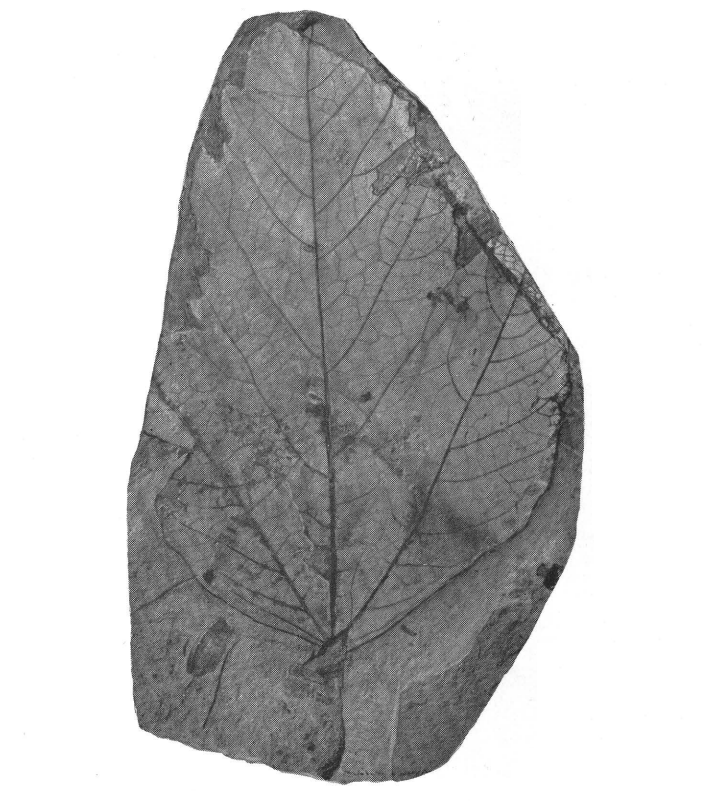
Acer idahoense holotype

- †Acer becki Wolfe & Tanai
- †Acer bosrivularis Wolfe & Tanai
- †Acer cadaver Wolfe & Tanai
- †Acer crokense Wolfe & Tanai
- †Acer cuprovallis Wolfe & Tanai
- †Acer elkoanum Wolfe & Tanai
- †Acer elwyni (Becker) Wolfe & Tanai
- †Acer florissanti Kirchner
- †Acer glabroides R.W.Brown
- †Acer idahoense Wolfe & Tanai
- †Acer jarbidgianum Wolfe & Tanai
- †Acer meyeri Wolfe & Tanai
- †Acer milleri Wolfe & Tanai
- †Acer wehri Wolfe & Tanai

==== Section Orba ====
- †Acer orbum LaMotte

=== Platanoidea Group ===
==== Section Campestria ====
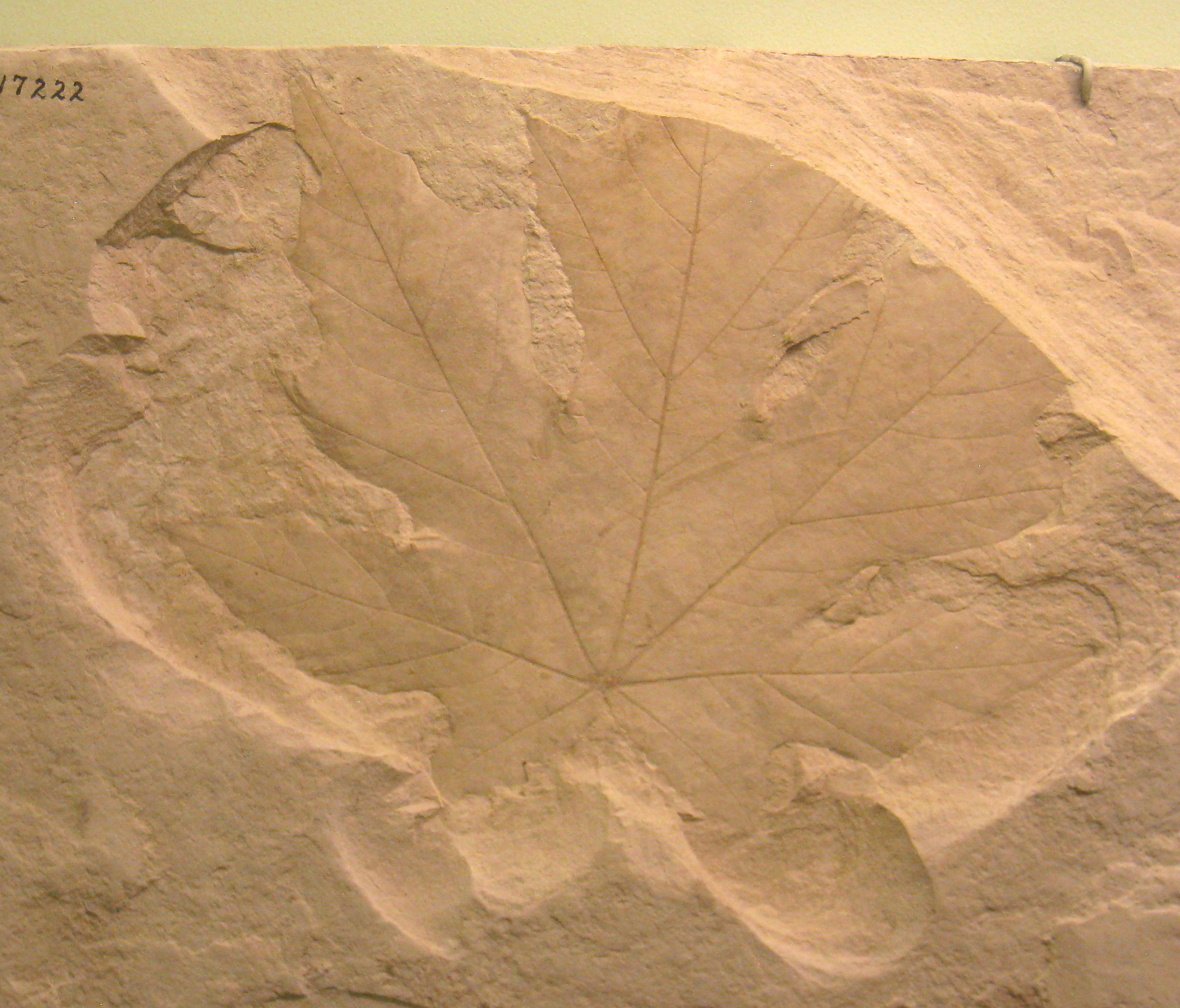
†Acer septilobatum

- †Acer protomiyabi Endo
- †Acer septilobatum Oliver
- †Acer tiffneyi Wolfe & Tanai

==== Section †Manchesteria ====
- †Acer axelrodi Wolfe & Tanai
- †Acer manchesteri Wolfe & Tanai

==== Section Platanoidea ====
- †Acer hueberi Wolfe & Tanai
- †Acer scottiae MacGinitie

=== Spicata Group ===
==== Section † Alaskana ====
- †Acer alaskense Wolfe & Tanai (Late Paleocene, Matanuska River Valley, Alaska)

==== Section †Douglasa ====
- †Acer douglasense Wolfe & Tanai (Early Eocene, Cape Douglas, Alaska)

==== Section Parviflora ====
- †Acer browni Wolfe & Tanai (Early-Middle Miocene; Washington, Oregon, British Columbia)
- †Acer smileyi Wolfe & Tanai (late Oligocene-Middle Miocene; Alaska, Idaho, Oregon, Nevada)

==== Section †Rousea ====
- †Acer rousei Wolfe & Tanai (Early Eocene, British Columbia)

==== Section †Stewarta ====
- †Acer hillsi Wolfe & Tanai (Early Eocene, Washington state)
- †Acer stewarti Wolfe & Tanai (Early Eocene, British Columbia)

==== Section †Torada ====
- †Acer stonebergae Wolfe & Tanai (Early Eocene, Washington State & British Columbia)
- †Acer toradense Wolfe & Tanai (Early Eocene, Washington State & British Columbia)
- †Acer washingtonense Wolfe & Tanai (Early Eocene, Washington State)
