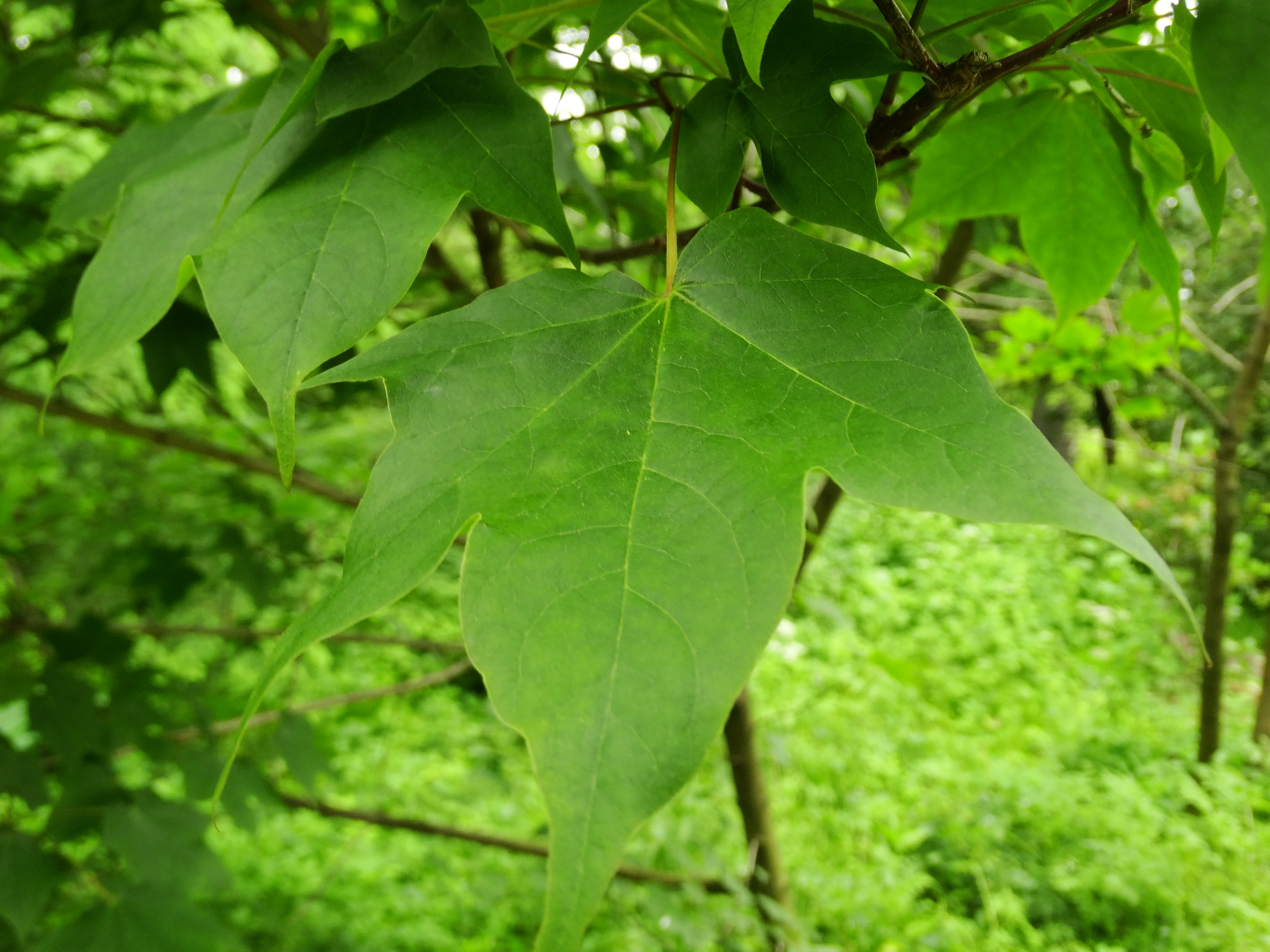

Scientific classification
- Kingdom: Plantae
- Clade: Tracheophytes
- Clade: Angiosperms
- Clade: Eudicots
- Clade: Rosids
- Order: Sapindales
- Family: Sapindaceae
- Genus: Acer
- Section: Acer sect. Platanoidea
- Species: A. longipes

Binomial name
- Acer longipes Franch. ex Rehder 1905

Synonyms
- List: Acer acutum var. quinquefidum W.P.Fang & P.L.Chiu; Acer fulvescens Rehder; Acer fulvescens subsp. danbaense W.P.Fang; Acer fulvescens var. fupingense W.P.Fang & W.K.Hu; Acer fulvescens subsp. fupingense (W.P.Fang & W.K.Hu) W.P.Fang & W.K.Hu; Acer fulvescens subsp. fuscescens W.P.Fang; Acer fulvescens var. pentalobum W.P.Fang & Soong; Acer fulvescens subsp. pentalobum (W.P.Fang & Soong) W.P.Fang & Soong; Acer hypotrichum Franch. ex W.P.Fang; Acer longipes var. chengbuense W.P.Fang; Acer longipes var. nanchuanense W.P.Fang; Acer longipes var. pubigerum (W.P.Fang) W.P.Fang; Acer longipes var. weixiense W.P.Fang; Acer nayongense var. hunanense (W.P.Fang & W.K.Hu) W.P.Fang & W.K.Hu; Acer pashanicum W.P.Fang & Soong; Acer firmianioides W.C.Cheng

= Acer longipes =

Species of plant

Acer longipes is an Asian species of maple. It has been found only in China (Chongqing, Guangxi, Henan, Hunan, Hubei, Jiangxi, Shaanxi).

Acer longipes is a small tree up to 10 meters tall, with purple bark. Leaves are non-compound, thin and papery, up to 14 cm wide and 15 cm across, usually with 3 lobes but occasionally 5 or none.
