= Acer tibetense =

Conservation status
- Vulnerable (IUCN 3.1)

Scientific classification
- Kingdom: Plantae
- Clade: Tracheophytes
- Clade: Angiosperms
- Clade: Eudicots
- Clade: Rosids
- Order: Sapindales
- Family: Sapindaceae
- Genus: Acer
- Section: Acer sect. Platanoidea
- Species: A. tibetense

Binomial name
- Acer tibetense W.P.Fang 1939

Species of maple

Acer tibetense is an uncommon Asian species of maple. It has been found only in Tibet.

Acer tibetense is a deciduous tree up to 10 meters tall. Leaves are non-compound, up to 9 cm wide and 8 cm across, thin, usually with 3 lobes but no teeth.
