= Acer yangbiense =

Conservation status
- Endangered (IUCN 3.1)

Scientific classification
- Kingdom: Plantae
- Clade: Tracheophytes
- Clade: Angiosperms
- Clade: Eudicots
- Clade: Rosids
- Order: Sapindales
- Family: Sapindaceae
- Genus: Acer
- Section: Acer sect. Acer
- Series: Acer ser. Acer
- Species: A. yangbiense

Binomial name
- Acer yangbiense Chen & Yang, 2003

Species of maple

Acer yangbiense is a species of maple with a very restricted distribution in Yunnan, China, only known from around ten specimens from a single locality on the western slope of Mount Cangshan in Yangbi County.

Acer yangbiense is a deciduous tree up to 20 metres (66 ft) in height with noticeably pubescent new branchlets. The leaves are five-lobed and large, up to 20 cm long and 25 cm across, again with clear pubescence on the veins on the underside of the leaves.
