= Acer shenkanense =

Scientific classification
- Kingdom: Plantae
- Clade: Tracheophytes
- Clade: Angiosperms
- Clade: Eudicots
- Clade: Rosids
- Order: Sapindales
- Family: Sapindaceae
- Genus: Acer
- Section: Acer sect. Platanoidea
- Species: A. shenkanense

Binomial name
- Acer shenkanense W.P.Fang 1981

Synonyms
- List: Acer cappadocicum var. tricaudatum (H.J.Veitch) Rehder; Acer cappadocicum subsp. trilobum A.E.Murray; Acer laetum var. tricaudatum H.J.Veitch; Acer laetum var. tricaudatum Rehder ex Veitch; Acer mono var. tricuspis (Rehder) Rehder; Acer pictum subsp. tricuspis (Rehder) H.Ohashi

Species of plant

Acer shenkanense (Shenkan maple, simplified Chinese: 陕甘枫; traditional Chinese: 陕甘楓; pinyin: shǎn gān fēng) is an Asian species of maple. It is endemic to China, where it is found in Gansu, Hubei, Shaanxi, and Sichuan provinces.

Acer shenkanense is a small deciduous tree up to 10 meters tall with brown or gray bark. Leaves are non-compound, up to 10 cm wide and 12 cm across, thin and papery, with 3 or 5 lobes.
