= Acer tenellum =

Conservation status
- Endangered (IUCN 3.1)

Scientific classification
- Kingdom: Plantae
- Clade: Tracheophytes
- Clade: Angiosperms
- Clade: Eudicots
- Clade: Rosids
- Order: Sapindales
- Family: Sapindaceae
- Genus: Acer
- Section: Acer sect. Platanoidea
- Species: A. tenellum

Binomial name
- Acer tenellum Pax 1889

Species of maple

Acer tenellum is an uncommon Asian species of maple. It is native to China (Hubei and Sichuan).

Acer tenellum is a small deciduous tree up to 7 meters tall with smooth gray bark. Leaves are non-compound, up to 6 cm wide and 6 cm across, thin, usually with 3 lobes but sometimes none.
