= Acer oligocarpum =

Conservation status
- Endangered (IUCN 3.1)

Scientific classification
- Kingdom: Plantae
- Clade: Tracheophytes
- Clade: Angiosperms
- Clade: Eudicots
- Clade: Rosids
- Order: Sapindales
- Family: Sapindaceae
- Genus: Acer
- Section: Acer sect. Palmata
- Series: Acer ser. Penninervia
- Species: A. oligocarpum

Binomial name
- Acer oligocarpum W.P.Fang & L.C.Hu 1979

Synonyms
- Acer foveolatum C. Y. Wu.

Species of maple

Acer oligocarpum is an Asian species of maple. It has been found only in China (Tibet and Yunnan).

Acer oligocarpum is a small tree up to 12 meters tall, with gray bark. Leaves are non-compound, thick and a bit leathery, up to 14 cm wide and 4.3 cm across, egg-shaped or lance-shaped with no teeth or lobes. The leaves have a purple petiole.
