= Acer wardii =

Conservation status
- Least Concern (IUCN 3.1)

Scientific classification
- Kingdom: Plantae
- Clade: Tracheophytes
- Clade: Angiosperms
- Clade: Eudicots
- Clade: Rosids
- Order: Sapindales
- Family: Sapindaceae
- Genus: Acer
- Section: Acer sect. Wardiana
- Species: A. wardii

Binomial name
- Acer wardii W.W.Sm. 1917

Synonyms
- Acer mirabile Hand.-Mazz.

Species of maple

Acer wardii is an uncommon Asian species of maple. It is found at high elevations (2400–3600 m) in Tibet, Yunnan, Myanmar, and Assam.

Acer wardii is a deciduous shrub or small tree up to 5 meters tall with dark gray bark. Leaves are non-compound, up to 9 cm wide and 8 cm across, thin and papery, with 3 lobes and many small teeth.
