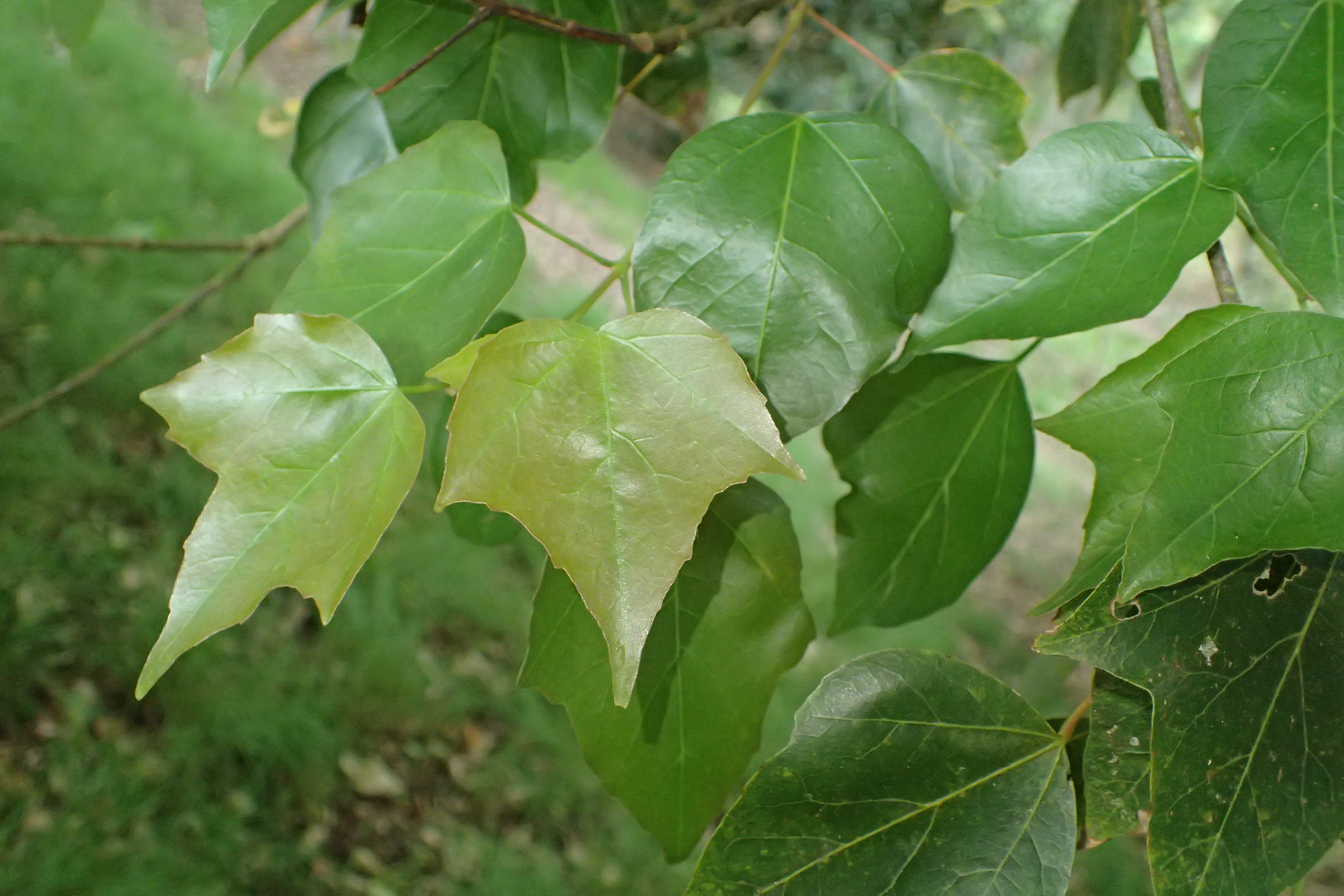

Scientific classification
- Kingdom: Plantae
- Clade: Tracheophytes
- Clade: Angiosperms
- Clade: Eudicots
- Clade: Rosids
- Order: Sapindales
- Family: Sapindaceae
- Genus: Acer
- Section: Acer sect. Pentaphylla
- Series: Acer ser. Trifida
- Species: A. paxii

Binomial name
- Acer paxii Franch. 1887

Synonyms
- List: Acer paxii var. semilunatum W.P.Fang

= Acer paxii =

Species of plant

Acer paxii is an Asian species of maple. It has been found only in southwestern China (Guangxi, Guizhou, Sichuan, Yunnan).

Acer paxii is an evergreen tree up to 15 meters tall, with brown bark. Leaves are non-compound, leathery, up to 11 cm wide and 6 cm across, toothless, sometimes unlobed but sometimes with 3 shallow lobes.
