= Acer fenzelianum =

Scientific classification
- Kingdom: Plantae
- Clade: Tracheophytes
- Clade: Angiosperms
- Clade: Eudicots
- Clade: Rosids
- Order: Sapindales
- Family: Sapindaceae
- Genus: Acer
- Section: Acer sect. Palmata
- Series: Acer ser. Palmata
- Species: A. fenzelianum

Binomial name
- Acer fenzelianum Hand.-Mazz. 1933

Synonyms
- Acer tonkinense subsp. fenzelianum (Hand.-Mazz.) A.E.Murray

Species of maple

Acer fenzelianum is an Asian species of maple. It has been found only in Yunnan and Vietnam.

Acer fenzelianum is a tree up to 20 meters tall with gray bark. Leaves are non-compound, moderately thick and slightly leathery, usually with 3 lobes, the central lobe much larger than the 2 small flanking lobes.
