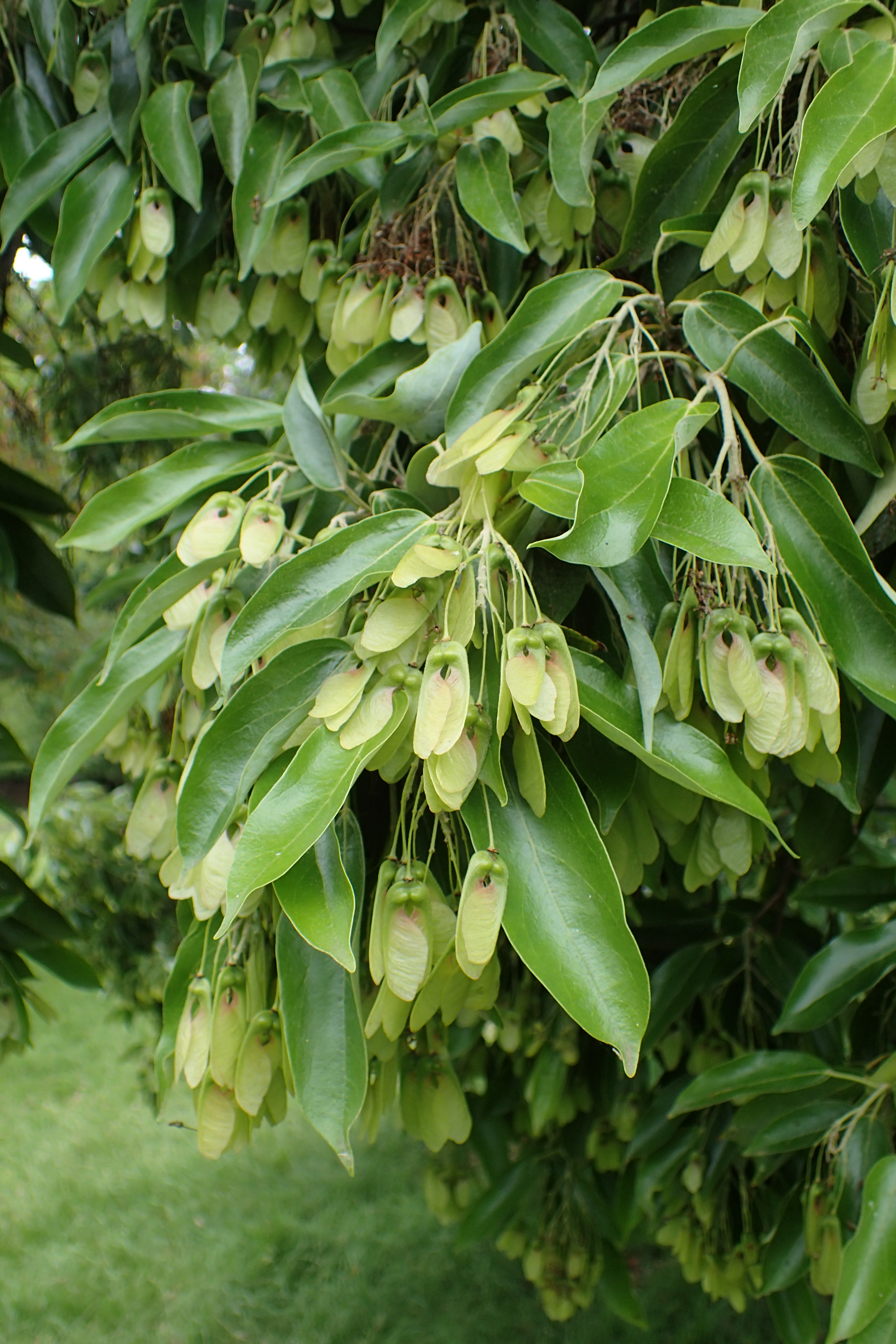

Scientific classification
- Kingdom: Plantae
- Clade: Tracheophytes
- Clade: Angiosperms
- Clade: Eudicots
- Clade: Rosids
- Order: Sapindales
- Family: Sapindaceae
- Genus: Acer
- Section: Acer sect. Pentaphylla
- Series: Acer ser. Trifida
- Species: A. coriaceifolium

Binomial name
- Acer coriaceifolium H.Lév. 1912

Synonyms
- List: Acer cinnamomifolium Hayata; Acer cinnamomifolium var. microphyllum W.P.Fang & S.Y.Liang; Acer coriaceifolium var. microcarpum W.P.Fang & S.S.Chang

= Acer coriaceifolium =

Species of plant

Acer coriaceifolium is an Asian species of maple. It has been found only in China (Anhui, Fujian, Guangdong, Guangxi, Guizhou, Hubei, Hunan, Jiangsu, Jiangxi, Sichuan, Zhejiang).

Acer coriaceifolium is a small tree up to 15 meters tall. Leaves are non-compound, thick and leathery, oblong or lance-shaped, up to 12 cm long and 5 cm across, no lobes or teeth.
