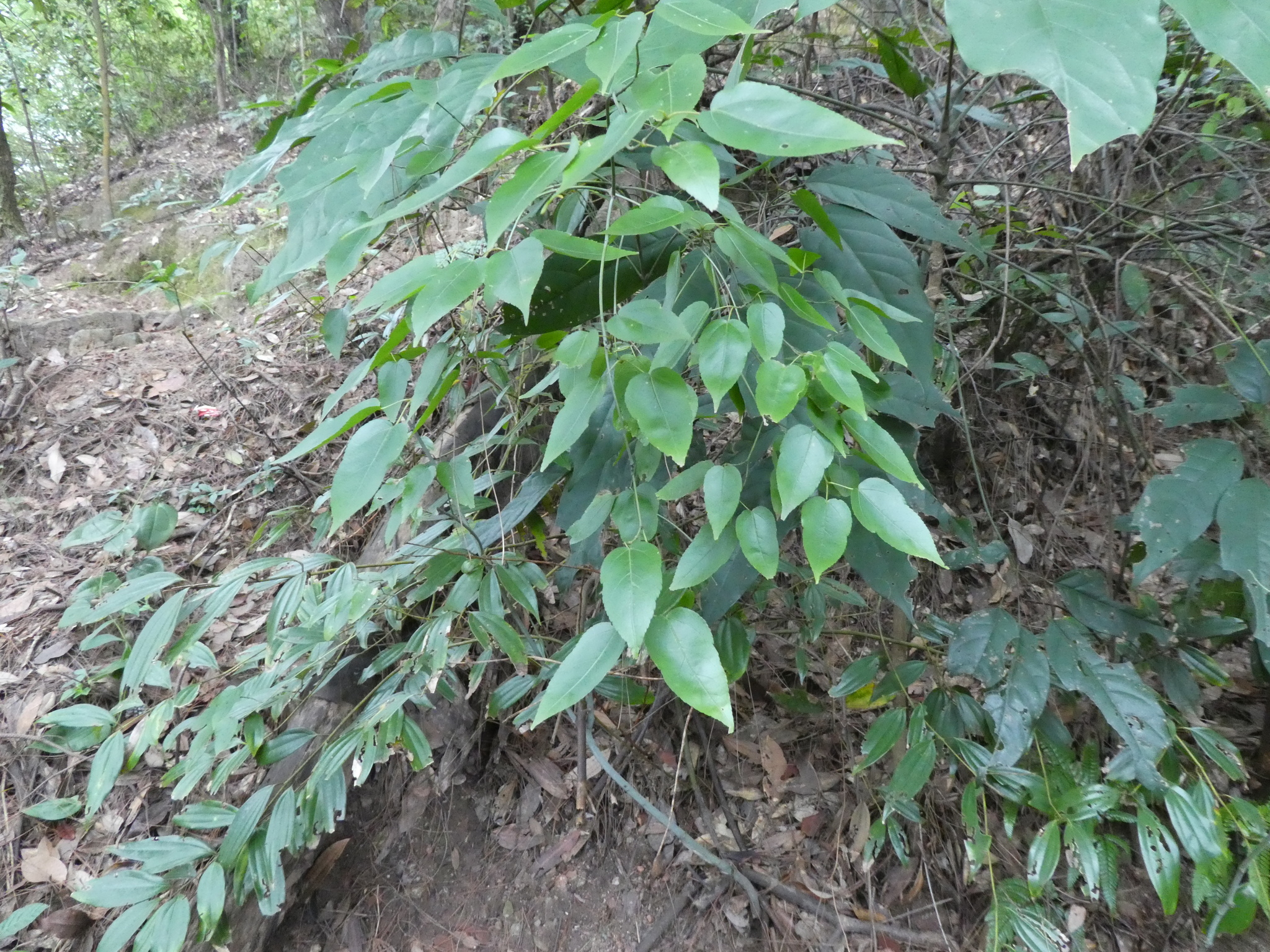

Scientific classification
- Kingdom: Plantae
- Clade: Tracheophytes
- Clade: Angiosperms
- Clade: Eudicots
- Clade: Rosids
- Order: Sapindales
- Family: Sapindaceae
- Genus: Acer
- Section: Acer sect. Palmata
- Series: Acer ser. Penninervia
- Species: A. cordatum

Binomial name
- Acer cordatum Pax 1889

Synonyms
- List: Acer cordatum var. jinggangshanense Z.X.Yu; Acer cordatum var. microcordatum F.P.Metcalf; Acer cordatum var. subtrinervium (F.P.Metcalf) W.P.Fang; Acer kuikiangense Hu & W.C.Cheng; Acer laevigatum subsp. cordatum (Pax) A.E.Murray; Acer laevigatum var. microcordatum (F.P.Metcalf) A.E.Murray; Acer subtrinervium F.P.Metcalf; Acer dimorphifolium F.P.Metcalf

= Acer cordatum =

Species of plant

Acer cordatum is an Asian species of maple. It has been found only in China.

Acer cordatum is a small tree up to 10 meters tall. Leaves are non-compound, either unlobed or with 2 or 3 lobes.

Varieties

- Acer cordatum var. cordatum - leaves not lobed - Anhui, Fujian, Guangdong, Guangxi, Guizhou, Hainan, Hubei, Hunan, Jiangxi, Sichuan, Yunnan, Zhejiang
- Acer cordatum var. dimorphifolium (F.P.Metcalf) Y.S.Chen - leaves each with 2 or 3 lobes -- Fujian, Guangdong, Jiangxi
