= Acer wangchii =

Scientific classification
- Kingdom: Plantae
- Clade: Tracheophytes
- Clade: Angiosperms
- Clade: Eudicots
- Clade: Rosids
- Order: Sapindales
- Family: Sapindaceae
- Genus: Acer
- Section: Acer sect. Pentaphylla
- Series: Acer ser. Trifida
- Species: A. wangchii

Binomial name
- Acer wangchii W.P.Fang 1966

Species of maple

Acer wangchii is an uncommon Asian species of maple. It has been found only in southwestern China (Guangxi, Guizhou).

Acer wangchii is an evergreen tree up to 15 meters tall with rough brown or purple bark. Leaves are non-compound, up to 11 cm wide and cm across, thick and leathery, lance-shaped with no lobes. Fruits are purple, this being unusual in the genus.
