= Acer lucidum =

Scientific classification
- Kingdom: Plantae
- Clade: Tracheophytes
- Clade: Angiosperms
- Clade: Eudicots
- Clade: Rosids
- Order: Sapindales
- Family: Sapindaceae
- Genus: Acer
- Section: Acer sect. Pentaphylla
- Series: Acer ser. Trifida
- Species: A. lucidum

Binomial name
- Acer lucidum F.P.Metcalf 1932

Synonyms
- Acer oblongum var. pachyphyllum W.P.Fang; Acer pehpeiense W. P. Fang & H. Y. Su; Acer wangchii subsp. tsinyunense W.P.Fang; Acer wuyishanicum W.P.Fang & C.M.Tan

Species of plant

Acer lucidum is an Asian species of maple. It has been found only in southern China (Fujian, Guangdong, Guangxi, Jiangxi, Sichuan).

Acer lucidum is a small tree up to 10 meters tall, with brown of grayish-brown bark. Leaves are non-compound, thick and leathery, up to 9 cm wide and 4 cm across, lance-shaped with no teeth or lobes.
