= Acer poliophyllum =

Scientific classification
- Kingdom: Plantae
- Clade: Tracheophytes
- Clade: Angiosperms
- Clade: Eudicots
- Clade: Rosids
- Order: Sapindales
- Family: Sapindaceae
- Genus: Acer
- Section: Acer sect. Pentaphylla
- Series: Acer ser. Trifida
- Species: A. poliophyllum

Binomial name
- Acer poliophyllum W.P.Fang & Y.T.Wu 1979

Species of maple

Acer poliophyllum is an Asian species of maple. It has been found only in southwestern China (Guizhou and Yunnan.).

Acer poliophyllum is a small evergreen tree up to 5 meters tall with dark gray bark. Leaves are non-compound, up to 7 cm wide and 4.5 cm across, thick and leathery, toothless, egg-shaped with no teeth or lobes.
