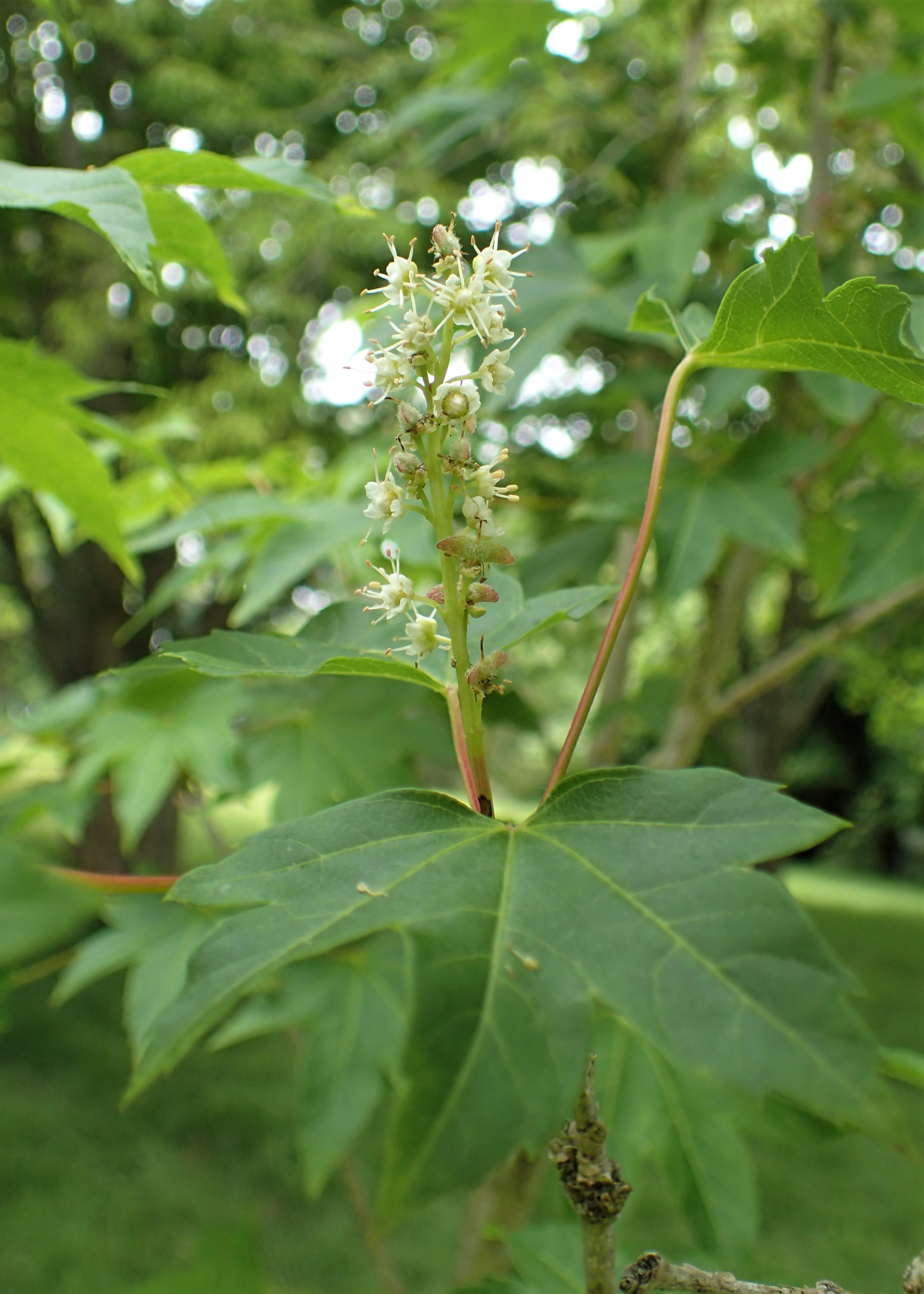

Scientific classification
- Kingdom: Plantae
- Clade: Tracheophytes
- Clade: Angiosperms
- Clade: Eudicots
- Clade: Rosids
- Order: Sapindales
- Family: Sapindaceae
- Genus: Acer
- Section: Acer sect. Palmata
- Series: Acer ser. Palmata
- Species: A. erianthum

Binomial name
- Acer erianthum Schwer. 1901

Synonyms
- Acer kweilinense W.P.Fang & M.Y.Fang; Acer oxyodon Franch. ex W.P.Fang; Acer stachyanthum Franch. ex W.P.Fang 1939 not Hiern 1874

= Acer erianthum =

Species of plant

Acer erianthum is an Asian species of maple. It has been found only in China (Gansu, Guangxi, Hubei, Shaanxi, Sichuan, Yunnan).

Acer erianthum is a tree up to 15 meters tall with greenish-gray bark. Leaves are non-compound, thin and papery, usually with 5 long tapering lobes but occasionally 7.
