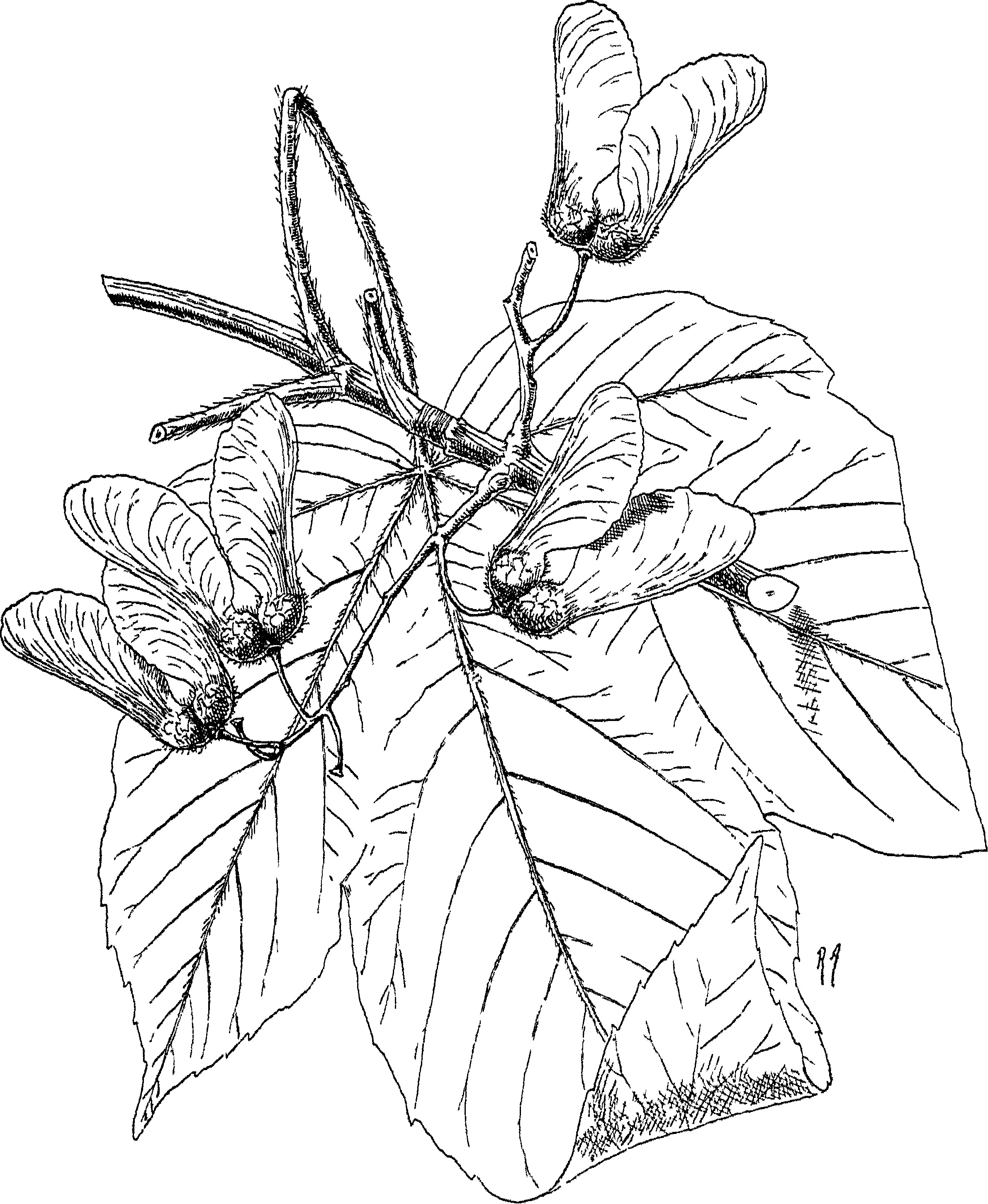
- Botanical illustration

Scientific classification
- Kingdom: Plantae
- Clade: Embryophytes
- Clade: Tracheophytes
- Clade: Spermatophytes
- Clade: Angiosperms
- Clade: Eudicots
- Clade: Rosids
- Order: Sapindales
- Family: Sapindaceae
- Genus: Acer
- Section: Acer sect. Pubescentia
- Species: A. pentapomicum

Binomial name
- Acer pentapomicum J.L.Stewart

Synonyms
- List: Acer fedtschenkoanum Krysht.; Acer pubescens Franch.; Acer xerophilum Butkov

= Acer pentapomicum =

Species of flowering plant

Acer pentapomicum, the Punjab maple, is a species of flowering plant in the genus Acer, native to Afghanistan, Pakistan, Central Asia and the western Himalaya. Preferring to grow 1,900 to 2,800 m (6,200 to 9,200 ft) above sea level, it is a member of the upper canopy in forested areas where it is found.
