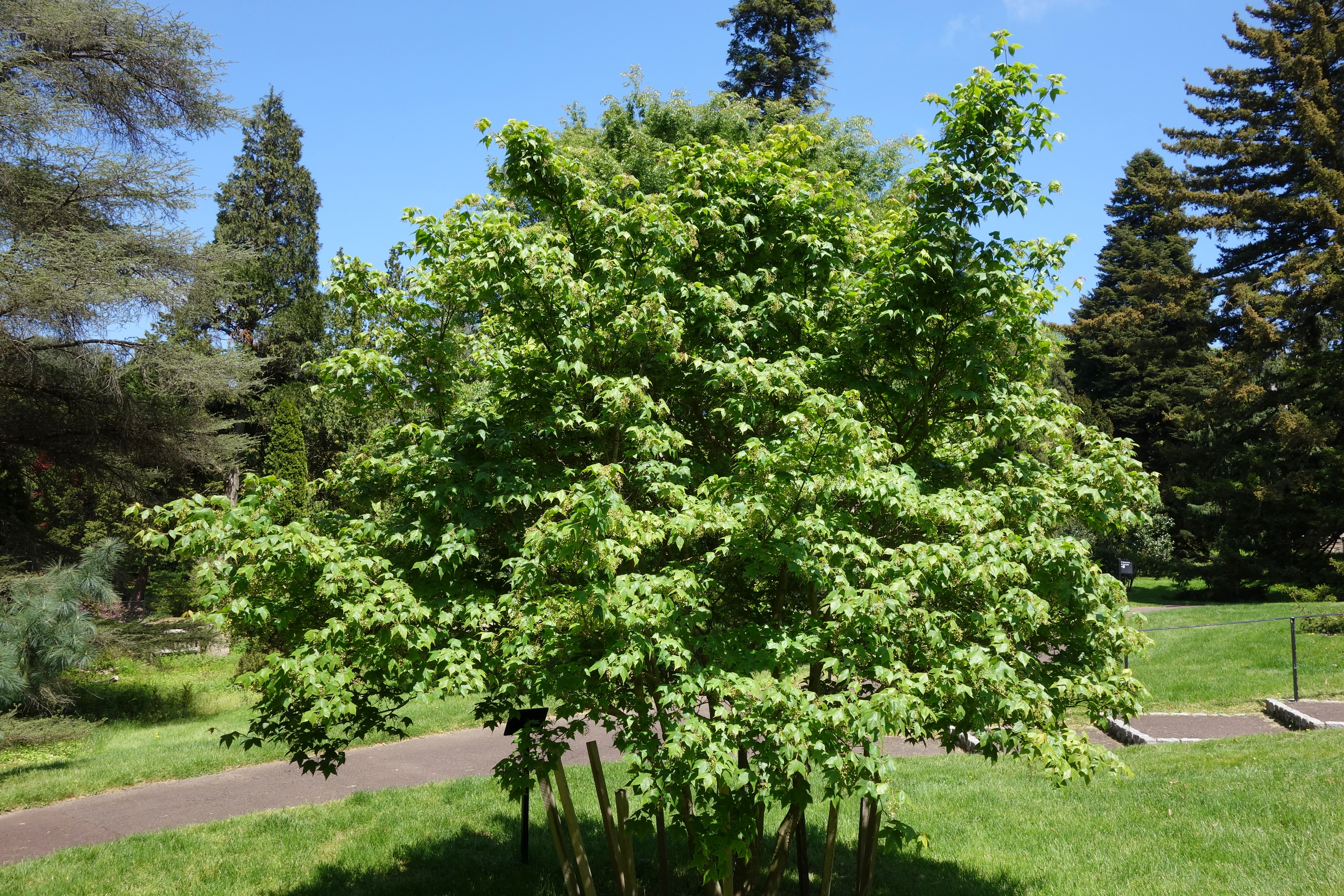

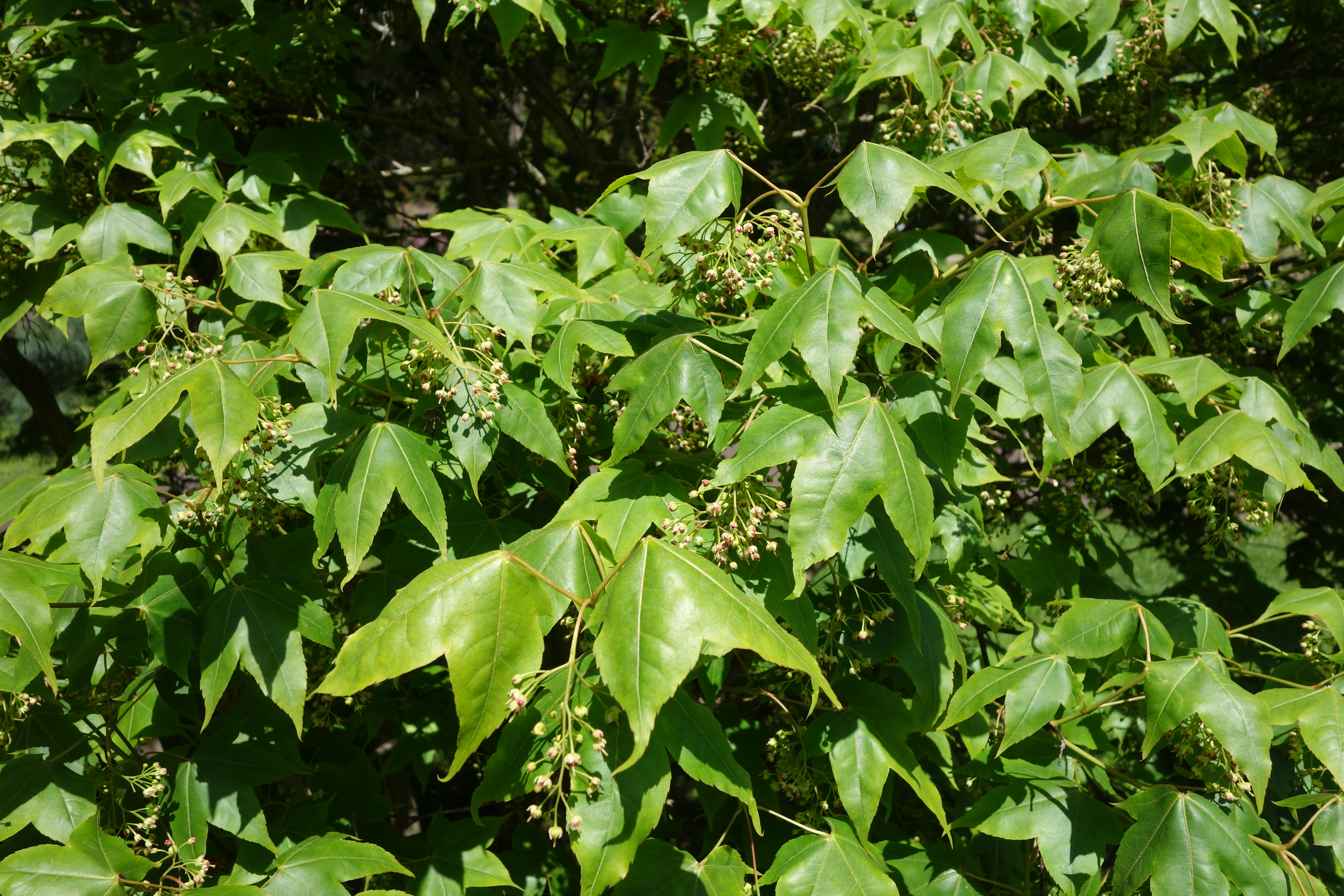

Scientific classification
- Kingdom: Plantae
- Clade: Embryophytes
- Clade: Tracheophytes
- Clade: Spermatophytes
- Clade: Angiosperms
- Clade: Eudicots
- Clade: Rosids
- Order: Sapindales
- Family: Sapindaceae
- Genus: Acer
- Section: Acer sect. Palmata
- Species: A. pubinerve

Binomial name
- Acer pubinerve Rehder

Synonyms
- Acer angustilobum var. kwangtungense (Chun) W.P.Fang; Acer campbellii subsp. chekiangense (W.P.Fang) A.E.Murray; Acer pubinerve var. apiferum W.P.Fang & P.L.Chiu; Acer pubinerve var. kwangtungense (Chun) W.P.Fang; Acer sinense subsp. chekiangense (W.P.Fang) A.E.Murray; Acer sinense var. kwangtungense Chun; Acer sinense var. pubinerve (Rehder) W.P.Fang; Acer wilsonii var. chekiangense W.P.Fang; Acer wilsonii var. kwangtungense (Chun) W.P.Fang; Acer wuyuanense W.P.Fang & Y.T.Wu; Acer wuyuanense var. trichopodum W.P.Fang & Y.T.Wu

= Acer pubinerve =

Species of maple

Acer pubinerve, synonyms including Acer wuyuanense, is a species of maple tree in the family Sapindaceae. It is native to South Central China and southeastern China. The species is a member of section Palmata.
