= Acer sutchuenense =

Conservation status
- Endangered (IUCN 3.1)

Scientific classification
- Kingdom: Plantae
- Clade: Tracheophytes
- Clade: Angiosperms
- Clade: Eudicots
- Clade: Rosids
- Order: Sapindales
- Family: Sapindaceae
- Genus: Acer
- Section: Acer sect. Trifoliata
- Series: Acer ser. Emeiensia
- Species: A. sutchuenense

Binomial name
- Acer sutchuenense Franch. 1894

Synonyms
- List: Acer tienchuanense W.P.Fang & Soong; Crula sutchuenensis (Franch.) Nieuwl.

Species of plant

Acer sutchuenense is an Asian species of maple. It is native to China (Hubei, Hunan, + Sichuan).

Acer sutchuenense is a deciduous tree up to 12 meters tall with smooth gray bark. Leaves are compound with 3 leaflets, each leaflet up to 15 cm wide and 6 cm across, thin and papery, with a few shallow teeth along the edges.
