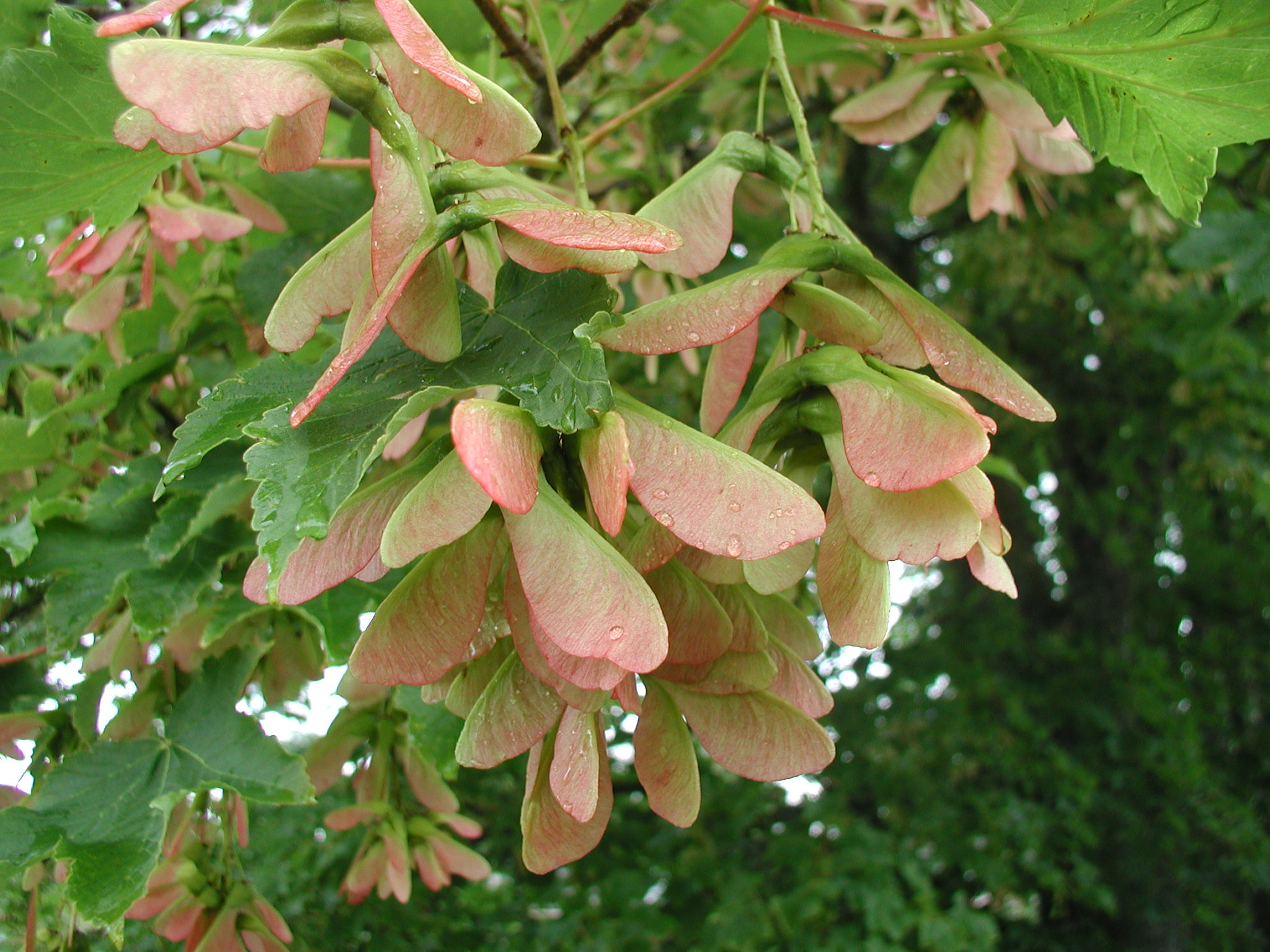

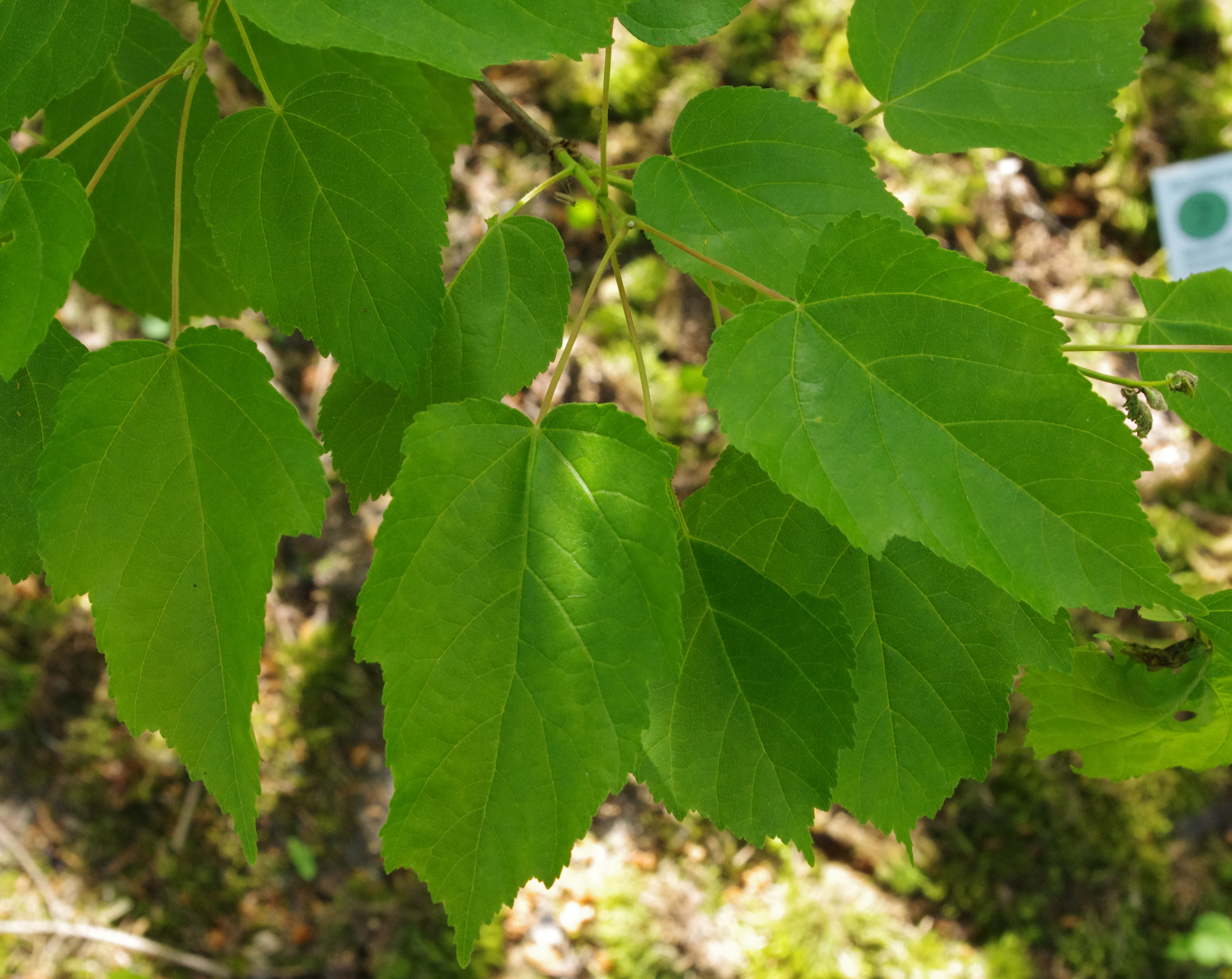

Conservation status
- Least Concern (IUCN 3.1)

Scientific classification
- Kingdom: Plantae
- Clade: Tracheophytes
- Clade: Angiosperms
- Clade: Eudicots
- Clade: Rosids
- Order: Sapindales
- Family: Sapindaceae
- Genus: Acer
- Section: Acer sect. Arguta
- Species: A. stachyophyllum

Binomial name
- Acer stachyophyllum Hiern 1875

Synonyms
- List: Acer muliense W.P.Fang & W.K.Hu; Acer tetramerum Pax; Acer betulifolium Maxim.

= Acer stachyophyllum =

Species of maple

Acer stachyophyllum is an Asian species of maple. It is native to China (Gansu, Henan, Hubei, Ningxia, Shaanxi, Sichuan, Tibet, Yunnan), Myanmar, northern India, Bhutan, and Nepal.

Acer stachyophyllum is a deciduous tree up to 15 meters tall with smooth yellow-brown bark. It is dioecious, meaning that male and female flowers are on separate trees. Leaves are non-compound, up to 11 cm wide and 6 cm across, thin and papery, sometimes with no lobes but sometimes with 3.

Subspecies

- Acer stachyophyllum subsp. betulifolium (Maxim.) P.C.DeJong — Gansu, Henan, Hubei, Ningxia, Shaanxi, Sichuan, Yunnan, Myanmar
- Acer stachyophyllum subsp. stachyophyllum — Hubei, Sichuan, Tibet, Yunnan, Bhutan, India, Myanmar, Nepal
