= Acer leptophyllum =

Scientific classification
- Kingdom: Plantae
- Clade: Tracheophytes
- Clade: Angiosperms
- Clade: Eudicots
- Clade: Rosids
- Order: Sapindales
- Family: Sapindaceae
- Genus: Acer
- Species: A. leptophyllum

Binomial name
- Acer leptophyllum W.P.Fang

Species of flowering plant

Acer leptophyllum is a species of maple tree native to southeastern China.
