= Acer gracilifolium =

Conservation status
- Endangered (IUCN 3.1)

Scientific classification
- Kingdom: Plantae
- Clade: Tracheophytes
- Clade: Angiosperms
- Clade: Eudicots
- Clade: Rosids
- Order: Sapindales
- Family: Sapindaceae
- Genus: Acer
- Section: Acer sect. Pentaphylla
- Series: Acer ser. Trifida
- Species: A. gracilifolium

Binomial name
- Acer gracilifolium W.P.Fang & C.C.Fu 1981

Species of maple

Acer gracilifolium is an Asian species of maple. It has been found only in Gansu and Sichuan Provinces in west-central China.

Acer gracilifolium is a small tree up to 5 meters tall with smooth brown or gray bark. Leaves are egg-shaped or oblong, non-compound, thin and papery, up to 8 cm wide and 5 cm across usually with 3 lobes, with a waxy, whitish underside.
