= Acer confertifolium =

Scientific classification
- Kingdom: Plantae
- Clade: Tracheophytes
- Clade: Angiosperms
- Clade: Eudicots
- Clade: Rosids
- Order: Sapindales
- Family: Sapindaceae
- Genus: Acer
- Section: Acer sect. Palmata
- Series: Acer ser. Palmata
- Species: A. confertifolium

Binomial name
- Acer confertifolium Merr. & F.P.Metcalf 1937

Synonyms
- List: Acer confertifolium var. serrulatum (Dunn) W.P.Fang; Acer johnedwardianum F.P.Metcalf; Acer oliverianum var. serrulatum (Dunn) Rehder; Acer tutcheri subsp. confertifolium (Merr. & Metc.) A.E.Murray; Acer wilsonii var. serrulatum Dunn

Species of plant

Acer confertifolium is an Asian species of maple. It has been found only in China (Fujian, Guangdong, Jiangxi).

Acer confertifolium is a shrub or small tree up to 4 meters tall. Leaves are non-compound, the blade narrowly egg-shaped, up to 5 cm long and 4 cm wide, each with 3 lobes and a few sharp teeth.
