= Acer leipoense =

Conservation status
- Endangered (IUCN 3.1)

Scientific classification
- Kingdom: Plantae
- Clade: Tracheophytes
- Clade: Angiosperms
- Clade: Eudicots
- Clade: Rosids
- Order: Sapindales
- Family: Sapindaceae
- Genus: Acer
- Section: Acer sect. Lithocarpa
- Species: A. leipoense

Binomial name
- Acer leipoense W.P.Fang & T.P.Soong, 1966

Species of maple

Acer leipoense is a species of maple, endemic to southwestern Sichuan in southwestern China. It is an endangered species, growing at altitudes of 2,000–2,700 m.

It is a deciduous small tree growing to 8 meters tall. The leaves are shallowly lobed with three lobes, 9–11 cm long and 7–12 cm broad.
