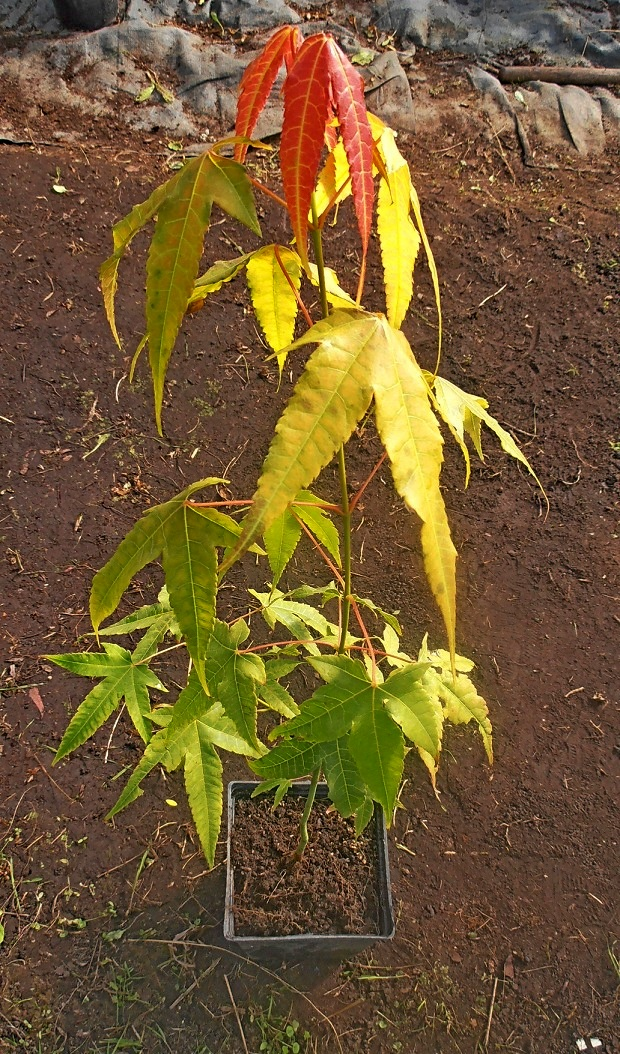

Scientific classification
- Kingdom: Plantae
- Clade: Tracheophytes
- Clade: Angiosperms
- Clade: Eudicots
- Clade: Rosids
- Order: Sapindales
- Family: Sapindaceae
- Genus: Acer
- Section: Acer sect. Palmata
- Series: Acer ser. Palmata
- Species: A. elegantulum

Binomial name
- Acer elegantulum W.P.Fang & P.L.Chiu 1979

Synonyms
- Acer olivaceum W.P.Fang & P.L.Chiu; Acer yaoshanicum W.P.Fang

= Acer elegantulum =

Species of plant

Acer elegantulum is an uncommon Asian species of maple. It has been found only in eastern China (Anhui, Fujian, Guangxi, Guizhou, Hunan, Jiangxi, Zhejiang).

Acer elegantulum is a tree up to 15 meters tall. Leaves are non-compound, thin and papery, with 5 long tapering lobes.
