= Acer robustum =

Scientific classification
- Kingdom: Plantae
- Clade: Tracheophytes
- Clade: Angiosperms
- Clade: Eudicots
- Clade: Rosids
- Order: Sapindales
- Family: Sapindaceae
- Genus: Acer
- Section: Acer sect. Palmata
- Series: Acer ser. Palmata
- Species: A. robustum

Binomial name
- Acer robustum Pax

Synonyms
- Acer anhweiense W.P.Fang & M.Y.Fang; Acer anhweiense var. brachypterum W.P.Fang & P.L.Chiu; Acer campbellii subsp. robustum (Pax) A.E.Murray; Acer robustum var. honanense W.P.Fang; Acer robustum var. minus W.P.Fang

Species of plant

Acer robustum is a species of flowering plant in the soapberry family Sapindaceae, native to central and southern China. It is a member of Acer section Palmata, series Palmata.
