= Acer shihweii =

Conservation status
- Critically Endangered (IUCN 3.1)

Scientific classification
- Kingdom: Plantae
- Clade: Tracheophytes
- Clade: Angiosperms
- Clade: Eudicots
- Clade: Rosids
- Order: Sapindales
- Family: Sapindaceae
- Genus: Acer
- Section: Acer sect. Pentaphylla
- Series: Acer ser. Trifida
- Species: A. shihweii

Binomial name
- Acer shihweii F.Chun & W.P.Fang 1966

Species of maple

Acer shihweii is a rare Asian species of maple. It has been found only in Guizhou Province in southern China.

Acer shihweii is a large tree up to 33 meters tall with rough brown bark. Leaves are non-compound, up to 15 cm wide and 8 cm across, thick and leathery, sometimes with no lobes, other times with a few shallow lobes.
