= Acer brevipes =

Scientific classification
- Kingdom: Plantae
- Clade: Tracheophytes
- Clade: Angiosperms
- Clade: Eudicots
- Clade: Rosids
- Order: Sapindales
- Family: Sapindaceae
- Genus: Acer
- Species: A. brevipes

Binomial name
- Acer brevipes Gagnep.

Species of maple

Acer brevipes is a species of maple tree native to Vietnam.
