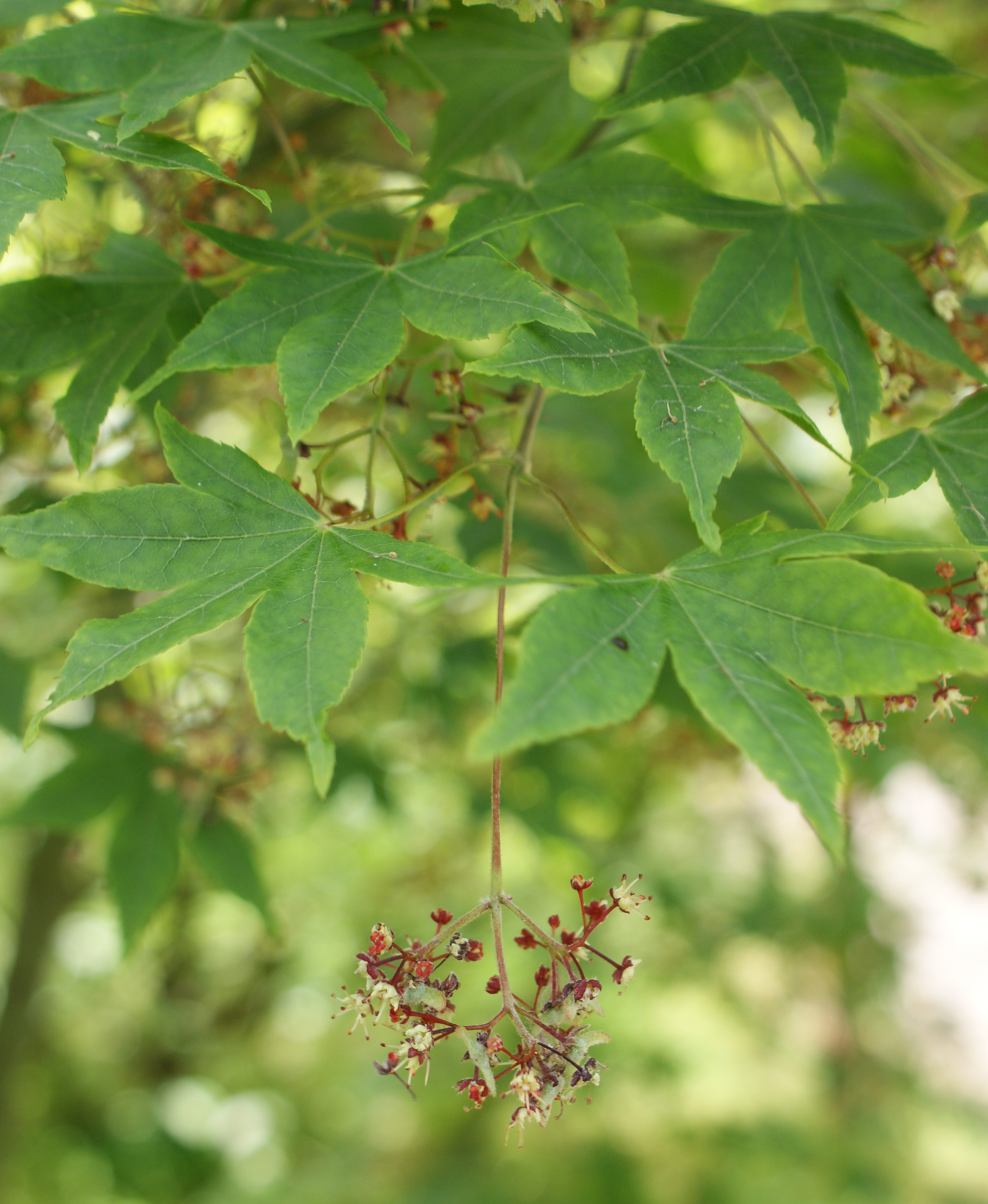

Scientific classification
- Kingdom: Plantae
- Clade: Tracheophytes
- Clade: Angiosperms
- Clade: Eudicots
- Clade: Rosids
- Order: Sapindales
- Family: Sapindaceae
- Genus: Acer
- Section: Acer sect. Palmata
- Series: Acer ser. Palmata
- Species: A. pauciflorum

Binomial name
- Acer pauciflorum W.P.Fang 1932

Synonyms
- Acer changhuaense (W.P.Fang & M.Y.Fang) W.P.Fang & P.L.Chiu; Acer pauciflorum var. changhuaense W.P.Fang & M.Y.Fang; Acer pubipalmatum W.P.Fang

= Acer pauciflorum =

Species of maple

Acer pauciflorum is an Asian species of maple in the family Sapindaceae. It has been found only in the Provinces of Anhui and Zhejiang in eastern China.

Acer pauciflorum is a multi-stemmed tree up to 15 meters tall. Leaves are up to 55 mm across, deeply cut into lobes, each leaf usually with 5 lobes but occasionally 7. Leaves are dark green on top but covered with white wool on the underside.
