= Acer crassum =

Scientific classification
- Kingdom: Plantae
- Clade: Tracheophytes
- Clade: Angiosperms
- Clade: Eudicots
- Clade: Rosids
- Order: Sapindales
- Family: Sapindaceae
- Genus: Acer
- Section: Acer sect. Palmata
- Series: Acer ser. Penninervia
- Species: A. crassum

Binomial name
- Acer crassum H.H.Hu & W.C.Cheng 1948

Species of flowering plant

Acer crassum
- Simplified Chinese: 厚叶枫
Transcriptions
Standard Mandarin
- Hanyu Pinyin: hòu yèfēng

Acer crassum is an uncommon Asian species of maple. It has been found only in the Province of Yunnan in southwestern China.

Acer crassum is a small tree up to 12 metres (39 ft) tall. Leaves are non-compound, thick and leathery, lance-shaped, up to 14 centimetres (5.5 in) long and 6 centimetres (2.4 in) across, no lobes or teeth.
