= Acer miaoshanicum =

Scientific classification
- Kingdom: Plantae
- Clade: Tracheophytes
- Clade: Angiosperms
- Clade: Eudicots
- Clade: Rosids
- Order: Sapindales
- Family: Sapindaceae
- Genus: Acer
- Section: Acer sect. Palmata
- Series: Acer ser. Palmata
- Species: A. miaoshanicum

Binomial name
- Acer miaoshanicum W.P.Fang 1966

Species of maple

Acer miaoshanicum is an uncommon Asian species of maple. It has been found only in southern China (Guangxi and Guizhou).

Acer miaoshanicum is a small tree up to 4 meters tall, with gray bark. Leaves are non-compound, thin and papery, up to 10 cm wide and 12 cm across, with 5 lobes but occasionally 3.
