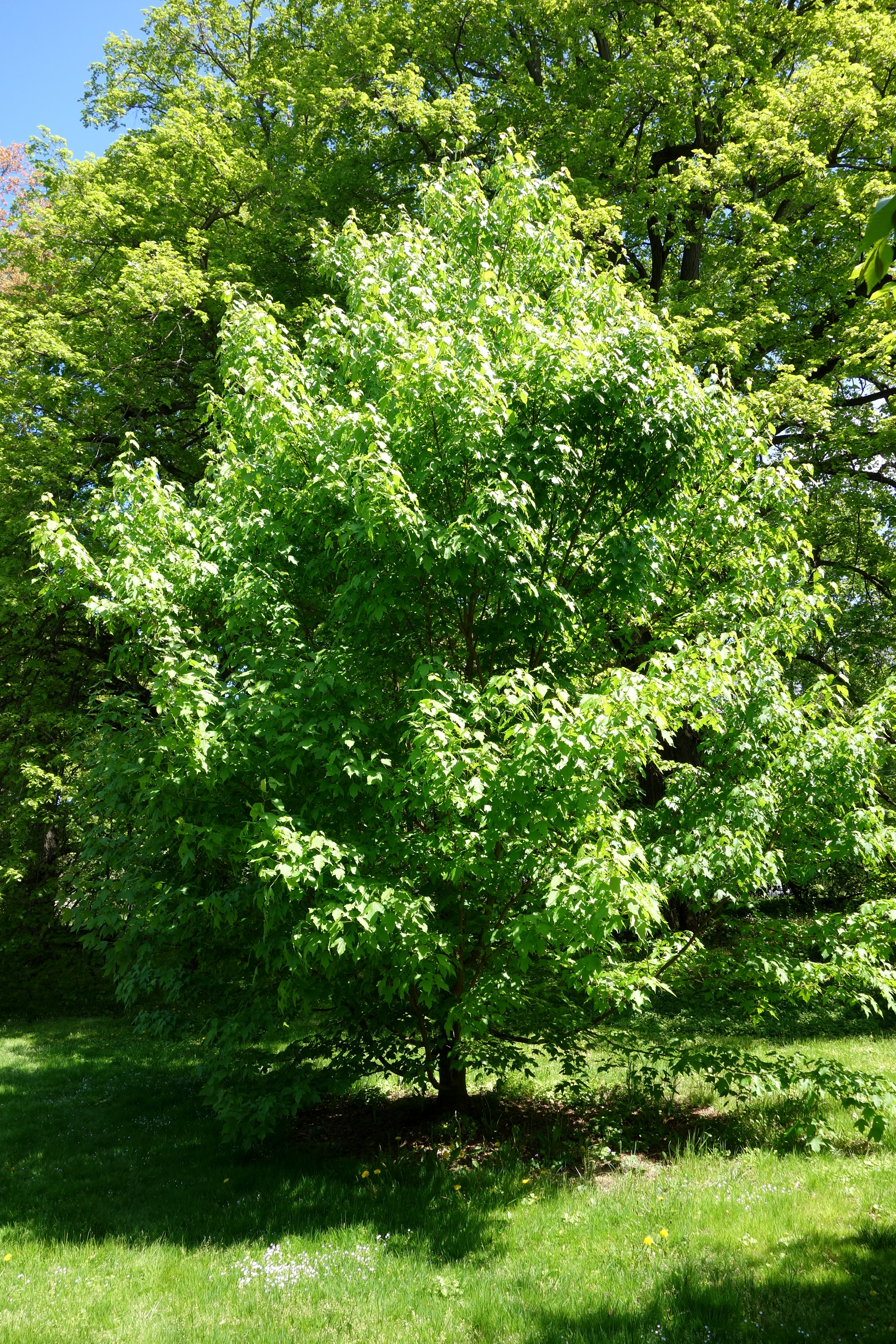
- Acer sterculiaceum subsp. franchetii

Scientific classification
- Kingdom: Plantae
- Clade: Tracheophytes
- Clade: Angiosperms
- Clade: Eudicots
- Clade: Rosids
- Order: Sapindales
- Family: Sapindaceae
- Genus: Acer
- Section: Acer sect. Lithocarpa
- Species: A. sterculiaceum

Binomial name
- Acer sterculiaceum Wall. 1830 not K. Koch 1869

Synonyms
- List: Acer villosum Wall. 1830 not J. Presl & C. Presl 1822; Acer franchetii Pax; Acer huianum W.P.Fang & C.C.Hsieh; Acer kungshanense W.P.Fang & C.Y.Chang; Acer kungshanense var. acuminatilobum (W.P.Fang & Chow) W.P.Fang; Acer lungshengense W.P.Fang & L.C.Hu; Acer schoenermarkiae Pax; Acer schoenermarkiae var. oxycolpum Hand.-Mazz.; Acer tsinglingense W.P.Fang & C.C.Hsieh; Acer platanifolium Griff. 1848 not Stokes 1812; Acer thomsonii Miq.

= Acer sterculiaceum =

Species of maple

Acer sterculiaceum, commonly known as Franchet’s maple or Himalayan maple, is a species of maple tree in the soapberry family. It is indigenous to Bhutan, northern India, and southwestern and central China (Guizhou, Henan, Hubei, Hunan, Shaanxi, Sichuan, Tibet, Yunnan).

Acer sterculiaceum grows at altitudes of 1,800–3,100 metres (5,900–10,200 ft). It is a tree up to 20 meters tall with dark gray or grayish-brown bark. Leaves are palmately lobed, usually with 3 or 5 lobes but occasionally 7. Leaves are up to 20 cm long, thick and a bit leathery, dark green and hairless on the top, lighter green and woolly on the underside.

Subspecies

- Acer sterculiaceum subsp. franchetii (Pax) A.E.Murray - central and southwestern China
- Acer sterculiaceum subsp. sterculiaceum - Yunnan, Tibet, Bhutan, India
- Acer sterculiaceum subsp. thomsonii (Miq.) A.E.Murray - northern India
