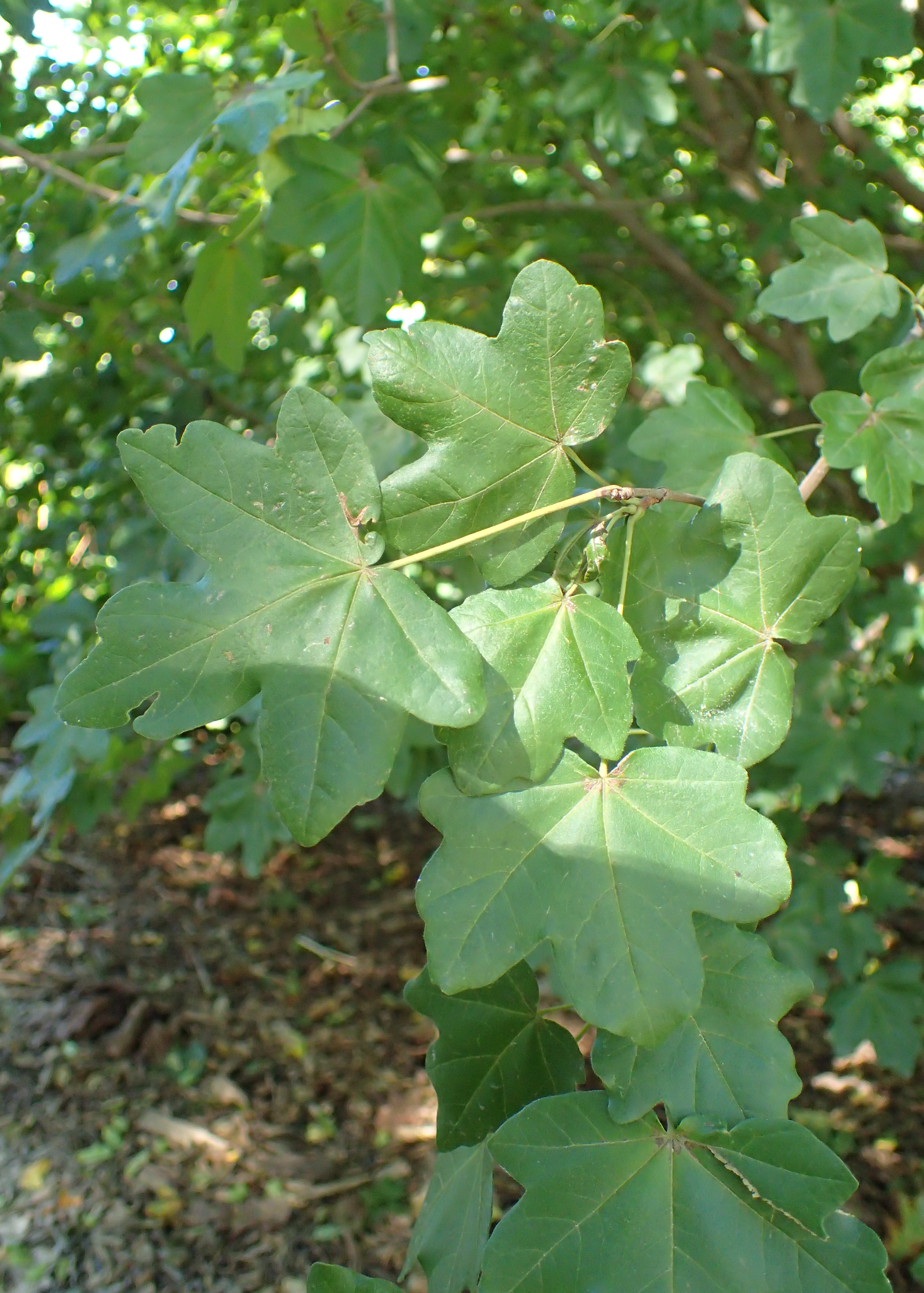
- Acer pilosum var. stenolobum leaves

Scientific classification
- Kingdom: Plantae
- Clade: Tracheophytes
- Clade: Angiosperms
- Clade: Eudicots
- Clade: Rosids
- Order: Sapindales
- Family: Sapindaceae
- Genus: Acer
- Section: Acer sect. Pubescentia
- Species: A. pilosum

Binomial name
- Acer pilosum Maxim. 1880

Synonyms
- Acer stenolobum Rehder

= Acer pilosum =

Species of plant

Acer pilosum is an Asian species of maple. It has been found only in north-central China (Gansu, Inner Mongolia, Ningxia, Shaanxi, Shanxi).

Acer pilosum is a small deciduous tree up to 5 meters tall. Leaves are non-compound, up to 8 cm wide and 12 cm across, toothless, deeply cut into 3 lobes.
