= Acer sinopurpurascens =

Scientific classification
- Kingdom: Plantae
- Clade: Tracheophytes
- Clade: Angiosperms
- Clade: Eudicots
- Clade: Rosids
- Order: Sapindales
- Family: Sapindaceae
- Genus: Acer
- Section: Acer sect. Lithocarpa
- Species: A. sinopurpurascens

Binomial name
- Acer sinopurpurascens W.C.Cheng 1931

Synonyms
- Acer diabolicum subsp. sinopurpurascens (W.C. Cheng) A.E. Murray

Species of plant

Acer sinopurpurascens is an Asian species of maple. It is native to southern China (Anhui, Hubei, Jiangxi, Zhejiang).

Acer sinopurpurascens is a deciduous tree up to 10 meters tall with brownish-gray bark. It is dioecious, meaning that male and female flowers are on separate trees. Leaves are non-compound, up to 14 cm wide and 8 cm across, thin and papery, usually with 5 lobes but sometimes with only 3. Flowers are purple, unlike the green flowers of most maples.
