= Acer tonkinense =

Scientific classification
- Kingdom: Plantae
- Clade: Tracheophytes
- Clade: Angiosperms
- Clade: Eudicots
- Clade: Rosids
- Order: Sapindales
- Family: Sapindaceae
- Genus: Acer
- Section: Acer sect. Palmata
- Series: Acer ser. Palmata
- Species: A. tonkinense

Binomial name
- Acer tonkinense Lecomte 1912

Synonyms
- List: Acer liquidambarifolium Hu & W.C.Cheng

Species of plant

Acer tonkinense is an Asian species of maple. It has been found in southwestern China (Guangxi, Guizhou, Tibet, Yunnan) and northern Indochina (Vietnam, Thailand, Myanmar).

Acer tonkinense is a deciduous tree that is up to 12 meters tall, with smooth brown bark. Its leaves are non-compound, up to 17 cm wide and 15 cm across, thick, and usually with 3 lobes.

Subspecies

- Acer tonkinense subsp. liquidambarifolium (Hu & W.C.Cheng) W.P.Fang
- Acer tonkinense subsp. tonkinense
