= Acer yinkunii =

Scientific classification
- Kingdom: Plantae
- Clade: Tracheophytes
- Clade: Angiosperms
- Clade: Eudicots
- Clade: Rosids
- Order: Sapindales
- Family: Sapindaceae
- Genus: Acer
- Section: Acer sect. Pentaphylla
- Series: Acer ser. Trifida
- Species: A. yinkunii

Binomial name
- Acer yinkunii W.P.Fang 1966

Species of maple

Acer yinkunii is a rare Asian species of maple. It has been found only in Guangxi Province in southern China.

Acer yinkunii is a shrub or small tree up to 5 meters tall with brown or purple bark. Leaves are non-compound, up to 5.5 cm wide and 2 cm across, leathery, with no lobes but a long tapering point at the tip.
