= Acer erythranthum =

Conservation status
- Near Threatened (IUCN 3.1)

Scientific classification
- Kingdom: Plantae
- Clade: Tracheophytes
- Clade: Angiosperms
- Clade: Eudicots
- Clade: Rosids
- Order: Sapindales
- Family: Sapindaceae
- Genus: Acer
- Section: Acer sect. Palmata
- Series: Acer ser. Penninervia
- Species: A. erythranthum

Binomial name
- Acer erythranthum Gagnep.

Species of maple

Acer erythranthum is a species of maple, endemic to Vietnam where it grows on elevations of 500 metres (1,600 ft).
