= Acer amamiense =

Conservation status
- Critically Endangered (IUCN 3.1)

Scientific classification
- Kingdom: Plantae
- Clade: Embryophytes
- Clade: Tracheophytes
- Clade: Angiosperms
- Clade: Eudicots
- Clade: Rosids
- Order: Sapindales
- Family: Sapindaceae
- Genus: Acer
- Section: Acer sect. Lithocarpa
- Species: A. amamiense

Binomial name
- Acer amamiense Yamazaki

Species of maple tree

Acer amamiense (also known as Amami maple) is a species of maple in the Sapindaceae family. It is native to Amami-Oshihma, in southern Japan.

== Description ==
Acer amamiense is a round-topped, deciduous tree, growing to about 4–5 m (13–16 ft) in height in the wild. New leaves are a deep purplish colour. Mature leaves are five-lobed and green, turning a bright red-purple in autumn. It resembles Acer diabolicum, but differs in having glabrous petioles and short-haired, rather than bristly fruit. Yellow flowers are produced before the leaves open in spring, followed by brown winged fruits on female plants.

== Distribution and habitat ==
Discovered in 1999, Acer amamiense is considered a critically endangered species, with a very limited native range, and only a dozen specimens existing in the wild. It favours acidic soil and a temperate mountain habitat.
