= Acer sycopseoides =

Scientific classification
- Kingdom: Plantae
- Clade: Tracheophytes
- Clade: Angiosperms
- Clade: Eudicots
- Clade: Rosids
- Order: Sapindales
- Family: Sapindaceae
- Genus: Acer
- Section: Acer sect. Pentaphylla
- Series: Acer ser. Trifida
- Species: A. sycopseoides

Binomial name
- Acer sycopseoides F.Chun 1932

Synonyms
- List: Acer coriaceifolium subsp. obscurilobum A. E. Murray.

Species of plant

Acer sycopseoides is an Asian species of maple. It is native to China (Guangxi, Guizhou, Yunnan).

Acer sycopseoides is a small tree up to 6 meters tall with gray bark. Leaves are non-compound, up to 8 cm wide and 4 cm across, thick and leathery, with a 1-2 short, shallow lobes along the edges.
