= Acer sino-oblongum =

Conservation status
- Endangered (IUCN 3.1)

Scientific classification
- Kingdom: Plantae
- Clade: Tracheophytes
- Clade: Angiosperms
- Clade: Eudicots
- Clade: Rosids
- Order: Sapindales
- Family: Sapindaceae
- Genus: Acer
- Section: Acer sect. Palmata
- Series: Acer ser. Penninervia
- Species: A. sino-oblongum

Binomial name
- Acer sino-oblongum F.P.Metcalf 1932

Species of maple

Acer sino-oblongum, the south China maple, is a species of evergreen maple tree native to China's Guangdong Province and Hong Kong.

Acer sino-oblongum is a short tree up to 7 meters tall. The leaves are elliptical and waxy, unlobed and untoothed unlike the multi-lobed leaves found on most maples. The tree occurs naturally in coastal evergreen forests.
