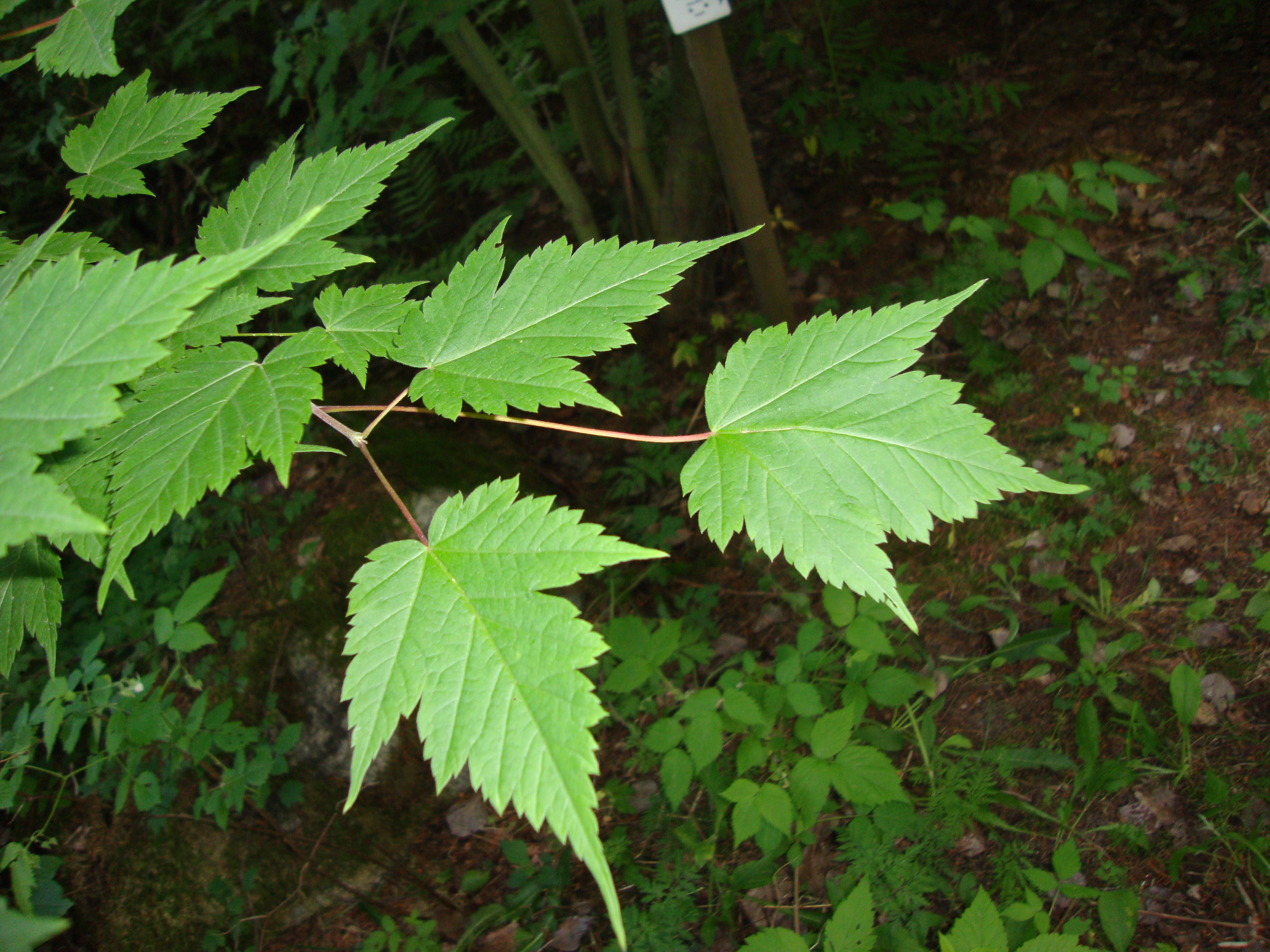

Scientific classification
- Kingdom: Plantae
- Clade: Tracheophytes
- Clade: Angiosperms
- Clade: Eudicots
- Clade: Rosids
- Order: Sapindales
- Family: Sapindaceae
- Genus: Acer
- Section: Acer sect. Arguta
- Species: A. barbinerve

Binomial name
- Acer barbinerve Maxim. 1867

Synonyms
- List: Acer barbinerve var. chanbaischanense S.L.Tung; Acer barbinerve var. glabrescens Nakai; Acer barbinerve f. glabrescens (Nakai) W.Lee; Acer diabolicum subsp. barbinerve (Maxim. ex Miq.) Wesm.; Acer megalodum W.P.Fang & H.Y.Su; Acer miyabei var. shibatae (W.P. Fang & H.Y. Su) Hara; Euacer barbinerve Opiz

= Acer barbinerve =

Species of maple

Acer barbinerve, commonly known as bearded maple, is an Asian species of maple found in Korea, eastern Russia, and northeastern China (Heilongjiang, Jilin, Liaoning).

Acer barbinerve may grow as a shrub or a multi-stemmed tree up to 7 meters tall. It has smooth gray bark; the leaves are non-compound, with 5 shallow lobes, the blade up to 10 cm long, with teeth along the edges. It is a dioecious species, with separate male and female plants.
