= Caloptilia monticola =

Scientific classification
- Kingdom: Animalia
- Phylum: Arthropoda
- Class: Insecta
- Order: Lepidoptera
- Family: Gracillariidae
- Genus: Caloptilia
- Species: C. monticola

Binomial name
- Caloptilia monticola Kumata, 1966

Species of moth

Caloptilia monticola is a moth of the family Gracillariidae. It is known from China and Japan (Hokkaidō and Honshū) and the Russian Far East.

The wingspan is 12–13 mm.

The larvae feed on Acer argutum, Acer distylum, Acer ginnala, Acer micranthum, Acer mono, Acer pentaphyllum, Acer rufinerve, Acer semenovii, Acer tschonoskii and Acer ukurunduense. They probably mine the leaves of their host plant.
