= Caloptilia semifasciella =

Scientific classification
- Kingdom: Animalia
- Phylum: Arthropoda
- Class: Insecta
- Order: Lepidoptera
- Family: Gracillariidae
- Genus: Caloptilia
- Species: C. semifasciella

Binomial name
- Caloptilia semifasciella Kumata, 1966

Species of moth

Caloptilia semifasciella is a moth of the family Gracillariidae. It is known from the islands of Hokkaidō, Honshū and Kyūshū in Japan.

The wingspan is 11–12 mm.

The larvae feed on Acer crataegifolium, Acer distylum, Acer micranthum, Acer rufinerve and Acer tschonoskii. They probably mine the leaves of their host plant.
