= List of Award of Garden Merit maples =

The maples belong to the genus Acer, an important group of mainly deciduous trees and shrubs in the family Sapindaceae, which are widely cultivated throughout the temperate northern hemisphere. Some, such as Acer griseum, have ornamental bark; but most are valued in cultivation for their brilliant autumn foliage in shades of yellow, orange and red. A vast number of cultivars have been developed for garden use. The palmate maple Acer palmatum alone has thousands of cultivars, many of which originate in Japan where the plant is especially prized for its compact size and elegant domed shape. Many maple species lend themselves to bonsai treatment.

All tolerate a range of growing conditions, but prefer a partially shaded, sheltered position in soil that is well-drained but also retains moisture. Most are reasonably hardy down to −20 °C (−4 °F) or so. The following is a selected list of cultivars which in the UK have gained the Royal Horticultural Society's Award of Garden Merit (confirmed 2018).

Species	Cultivar name	Year	Ref	Autumn colour	Height	Spread	Image
A. campestre		1993		yellow/red	12m	8m	
A. cappadocicum	'Aureum'	1993		yellow	12m	8m	
A. cappadocicum	'Rubrum'	1993		yellow	12m	8m	
A. davidii	'George Forrest'	1993		yellow	12m	8m	
A. × freemanii	Autumn Blaze='Jeffersred'	2012		orange/red	12m	8m	
A. griseum		1993		orange/red	12m	8m	
A. japonicum	'Aconitifolium'	1993		red	8m	8m	
A. japonicum	'Vitifolium'	1993		red	8m	8m	
A. micranthum		2012		orange	8m	4m	
A. negundo	'Winter Lightning'	2012		yellow	10m	8m	
A. negundo var. violaceum		2012		purple	12m	8m	
A. palmatum	'Beni-maiko'	1993		yellow/orange/red	1.5m	1.5m	
A. palmatum	'Beni-tsukasa'	1993		orange	2.5m	2.5m	
A. palmatum	'Bloodgood'	1993		red	4m	4m	
A. palmatum	'Burgundy Lace'	1993		purple	4m	4m	
A. palmatum	'Chitose-yama'	1993		red	2.5m	2.5m	
A. palmatum	'Crimson Queen'	1993		red/purple	2.5m	2.5m	
A. palmatum	'Elegans'	2012		yellow/orange/red	2.5m	2.5m	
A. palmatum	'Garnet'	1993		red/purple	1.5m	2.5m	
A. palmatum	'Inaba-shidare'	1993		red/purple	2.5m	2.5m	
A. palmatum	'Katsura'	2002		orange	4m	4m	
A. palmatum	'Orange Dream'	2012		orange/yellow	4m	4m	
A. palmatum	'Orangeola'	2012		orange/red	4m	2.5m	
A. palmatum	'Ornatum'	2012		red	3m	1.5m	
A. palmatum	'Osakazuki'	1993		red/pink	4m	4m	
A. palmatum	'Red Pygmy'	1993		red/purple	1.5m	1.5m	
A. palmatum	'Sango-kaku'	1993		yellow/red	6m	4m	
A. palmatum	'Seiryu'	1993		yellow/orange/red	4m	4m	
A. palmatum	'Shin-deshojo'	2012		red/orange	2.5m	2.5m	
A. palmatum	'Shish geshira'	2012		orange	4m	2.5m	
A. palmatum	'Trompenburg'	2002		orange/red	4m	4m	
A. palmatum	'Villa Taranto'	2012		yellow	4m	2.5m	
A. platanoides	'Crimson King'	1993		purple/crimson	12m	8m	
A. platanoides	Princeton Gold='Prigo'	2012		yellow	12m	8m	
A. pseudoplatanus	'Brilliantissimum'	1993		pink/green/cream	8m	8m	
A. rubrum	'October Glory'	1993		red	12m	8m	
A. rubrum	Red Sunset='Franksred'	2012		red	12m	8m	
A. shirasawanum	'Aureum'	1993		yellow	8m	8m	
A. tegmentosum		2012		yellow	12m	8m	
A. triflorum		2002		orange	12m	8m	
