= 1961 in paleontology =

Paleontology or palaeontology is the study of prehistoric life forms on Earth through the examination of plant and animal fossils. This includes the study of body fossils, tracks (ichnites), burrows, cast-off parts, fossilised feces (coprolites), palynomorphs and chemical residues. Because humans have encountered fossils for millennia, paleontology has a long history both before and after becoming formalized as a science. This article records significant discoveries and events related to paleontology that occurred or were published in the year 1961.

== Plants ==
=== Angiosperms ===
Name	Novelty	Status	Authors	Age	Unit	Location	Notes	Images
Acer beckianum	Sp nov	Valid	Prakash & Barghoorn	Langhian	Ginkgo Petrified Forest	USA; Washington	A maple, described from petrified wood	
Acer palaeorufinerve	sp nov	Valid	Tanai & Onoe	Miocene - Pliocene	Ningyo-toge Formation		A maple, A member of the Macrantha section.	
Davisicarpum	Gen et sp nov	valid	Chandler	Ypresian	London Clay	UK; England	A moon seed relative. Type species D. gibbosum	

== Archosauromorphs ==
=== Phytosaurs ===
Name	Novelty	Status	Authors	Age	Unit	Location	Notes	Images
Rileyasuchus	Gen et comb nov	Nomen dubium.	Kuhn	Rhaetian		UK; England	A dubious phytosaur, possibly a chimera; replacement name for Rileya von Huene 1902 (non Ashmead, 1888).	

=== Pseudosuchians ===
Name	Novelty	Status	Authors	Age	Unit	Location	Notes	Images
Avalonianus	Gen et comb nov	Nomen dubium	Kuhn	Late Triassic (Rhaetian)		UK; England	Dubious non-dinosaurian archosaur; replacement name for Avalonia Seeley, 1898 (non Walcott, 1889).	
Dasygnathoides	Gen et comb nov	Nomen dubium?	Kuhn	Late Triassic (Carnian)	Lossiemouth Sandstone	UK; Scotland	A pseudosuchian of uncertain affinity. Replacement name for Dasygnathus Huxley, 1877 (non MacLeay, 1819).	

=== Dinosaurs ===
Data courtesy of George Olshevsky's dinosaur genera list.

Name	Novelty	Status	Authors	Age	Unit	Location	Notes	Images
Astrodonius	Gen et comb nov	Junior synonym	Kuhn	Early Cretaceous	Arundel Formation	USA; Maryland	Junior synonym of Astrodon.	Astrodon johnstoni
Campylodoniscus	Gen et comb nov	Nomen dubium.	Kuhn	Late Cretaceous	Bajo Barreal Formation	Argentina	A possible titanosaur Replacement name for "Campylodon" von Huen 1929	Campylodoniscus
Pachysaurops	Gen et sp nov	Junior synonym	von Huene	Late Triassic		Germany	Junior synonym of Pachysauriscus.	

=== Birds ===
Name	Novelty	Status	Authors	Age	Unit	Location	Notes	Images
Anas pullulans	Sp nov.	valid	Brodkorb	Early Pliocene	Juntura Formation	USA (Oregon)	An Anatidae.	
Eremochen	Gen et Sp nov.	valid	Brodkorb	Early Pliocene	Juntura Formation	USA (Oregon)	An Anatidae, type species E. russelli.	
Fulica infelix	Sp. nov.	valid	Brodkorb	Early Pliocene	Juntura Formation	USA (Oregon)	A Rallidae.	
Ocyplonessa shotwelli	Sp. nov.	jr synonym	Brodkorb	Late Miocene - Early Pliocene	Juntura Formation	USA (Oregon)	An Anatidae, moved to Histrionicuslli shotwelli by Olson & Rasmussen, 2001	
Megapaloelodus opsigonus	Sp. nov.	valid	Brodkorb	Early Pliocene	Juntura Formation	USA (Oregon)	A Palaelodidae.	
Neortyx	Gen et Sp. nov.	valid	Holman	Early Pliocene	Juntura Formation	USA (Oregon)	An Odontophoridae; Type species N. peninsularis	
Phalacrocorax leptopus	Sp. nov.	valid	Brodkorb	Early Pliocene	Juntura Formation	USA (Oregon)	A Phalacrocoracidae.	
Puffinus mitchelli	Sp. nov.	valid	Miller	Middle Miocene	Temblor Formation	USA (California)	A Procellariidae.	
Puffinus priscus	Sp. nov.	valid	Miller	Middle Miocene	Temblor Formation	USA (California)	A Procellariidae.	
