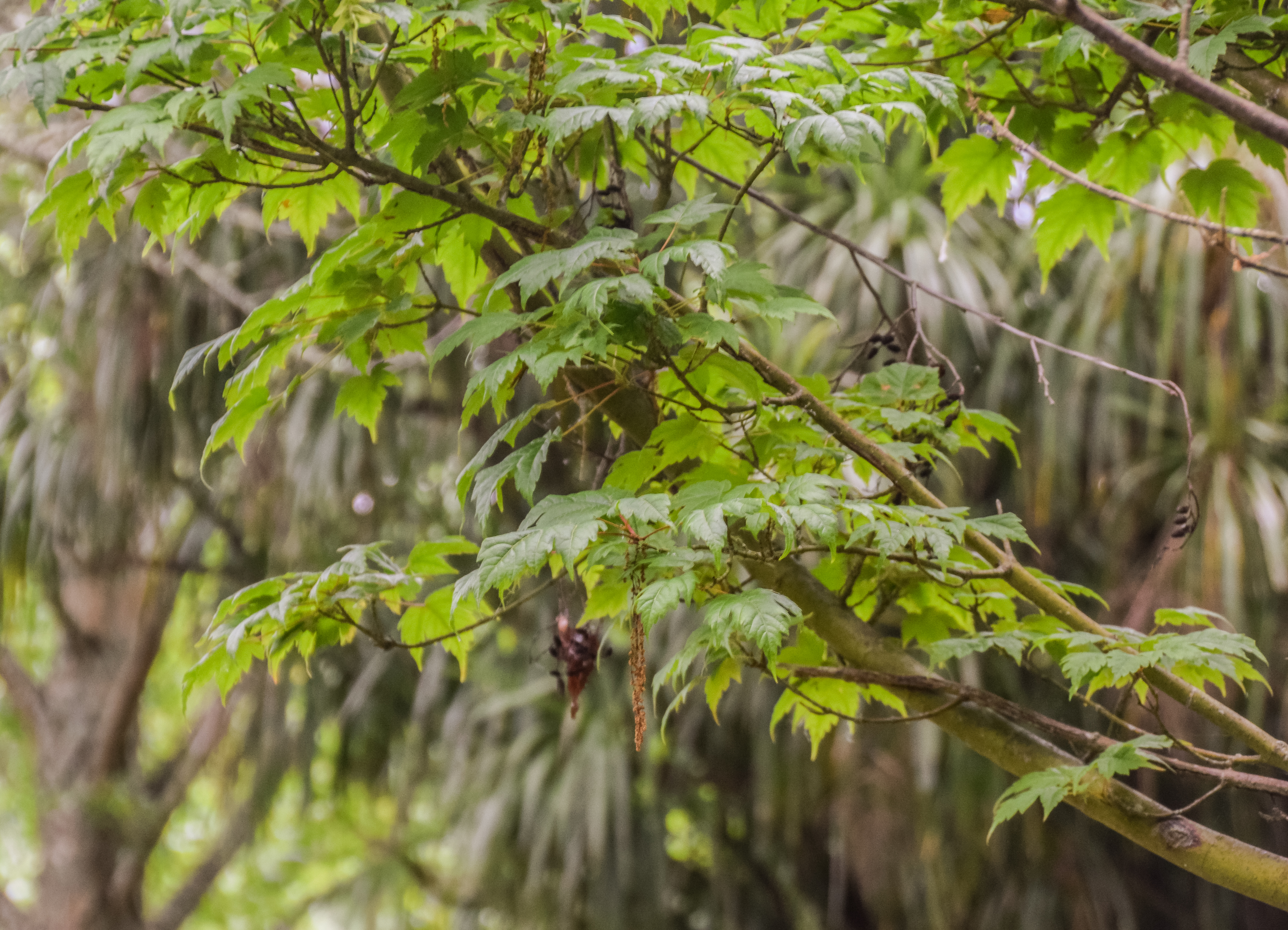

Scientific classification
- Kingdom: Plantae
- Clade: Embryophytes
- Clade: Tracheophytes
- Clade: Spermatophytes
- Clade: Angiosperms
- Clade: Eudicots
- Clade: Rosids
- Order: Sapindales
- Family: Sapindaceae
- Genus: Acer
- Section: Acer sect. Macrantha
- Species: A. komarovii

Binomial name
- Acer komarovii Pojark.

Synonyms
- Acer tschonoskii subsp. koreanum A.E.Murray

= Acer komarovii =

Species of flowering plant

Acer komarovii, the Korean butterfly maple, is a species of flowering plant in the genus Acer, native to Manchuria, the Korean peninsula, and Primorsky Krai in Russia. It can be distinguished from other members of the Acer tschonoskii species complex by having racemes with 6 to 8 flowers, and samara wings that average 12 mm long (ranging between 10 and 17 mm), and 7 mm wide (ranging between 6 and 9 mm).
