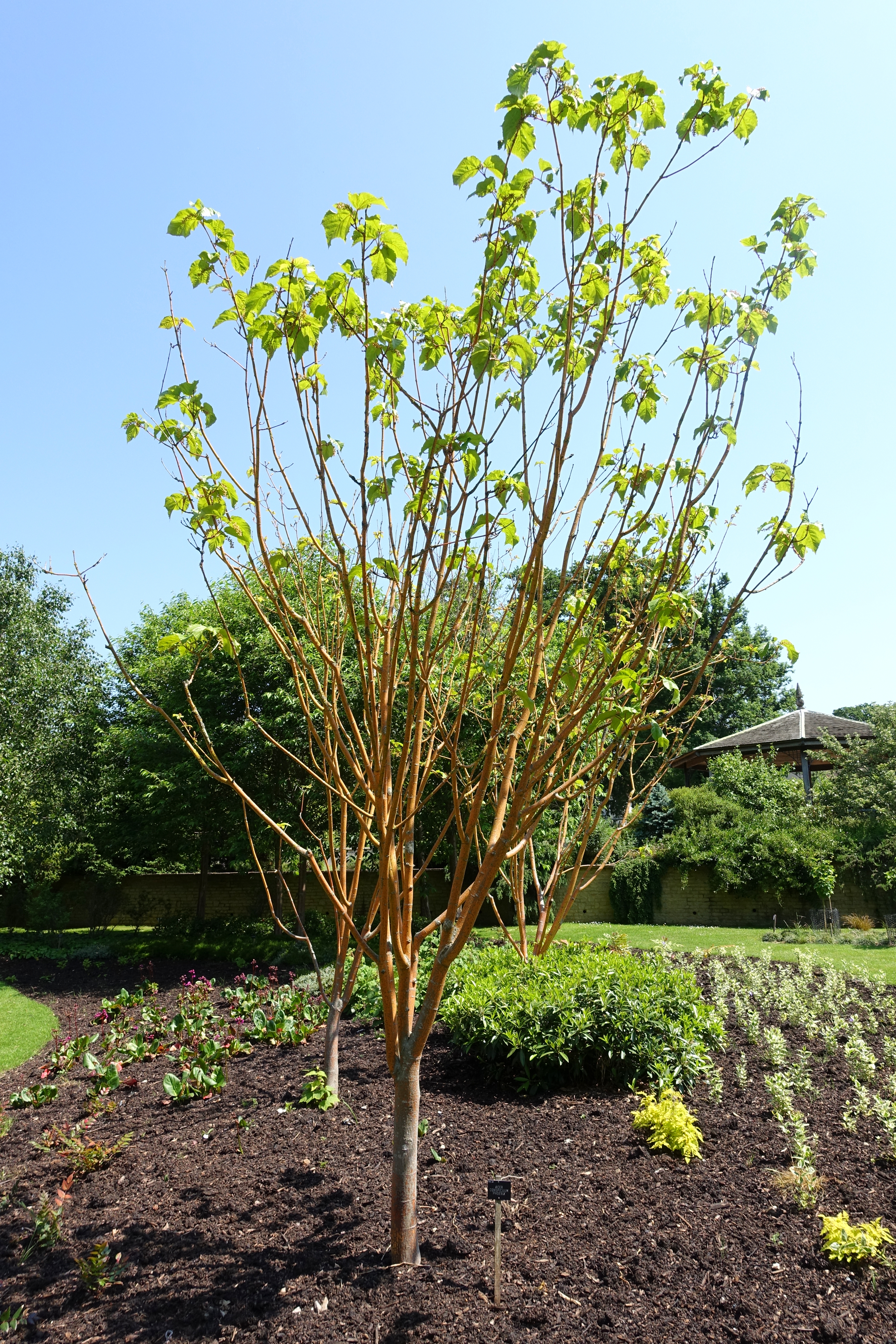
- Acer × conspicuum 'Phoenix'

Scientific classification
- Kingdom: Plantae
- Clade: Tracheophytes
- Clade: Angiosperms
- Clade: Eudicots
- Clade: Rosids
- Order: Sapindales
- Family: Sapindaceae
- Genus: Acer
- Section: Acer sect. Macrantha
- Species: A. × conspicuum

Binomial name
- Acer × conspicuum van Gelderen & Oterdoom

= Acer × conspicuum =

Hybrid species of maple tree

Acer × conspicuum, called the snakebark maple (which is also the name for all of the members of its section, Macrantha), is a hybrid species of maple. It was created in the Netherlands by crossing Acer davidii (Père David's maple) with Acer pensylvanicum (striped maple).

== Cultivars ==
A number of cultivars are commercially available. Developed as ornamentals, they are planted for visual interest, particularly winter interest. They are known for the bright colors and striking variegation in their bark and leaves. There is some doubt about the parentage of some of following cultivars:

- 'Candy Stripe'
- 'Elephant's Ear'
- 'Mozart'
- 'Phoenix'
- 'Red Flamingo'
- 'Silver Cardinal'
- 'Silver Ghost'
- 'Silver Vein'
