= Macrantha =

Several plant taxa contain the word macrantha, meaning "large-flowered":

Infrageneric taxa

- Cypripedium sect. Macrantha, a group of slipper orchids in the genus Cypripedium
- Acer sect. Macrantha, a group of maples in the genus Acer
- Papaver sect. Macrantha, a group of poppies in the genus Papaver
