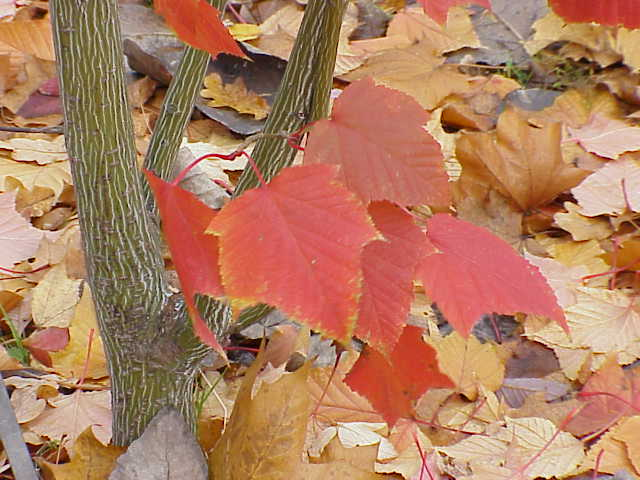
- Autumn foliage

Scientific classification
- Kingdom: Plantae
- Clade: Tracheophytes
- Clade: Angiosperms
- Clade: Eudicots
- Clade: Rosids
- Order: Sapindales
- Family: Sapindaceae
- Genus: Acer
- Section: Acer sect. Macrantha
- Species: A. capillipes

Binomial name
- Acer capillipes Maxim.

= Acer capillipes =

Species of maple

Acer capillipes (Kyushu maple or red snakebark maple; Japanese: ホソエカエデ, romanized: hosoekaede), is a maple in the same taxonomic section as other snakebark maples such as A. pensylvanicum, A. davidii and A. rufinerve. It is native to mountainous regions in Japan, on central and southern Honshū (Fukushima Prefecture southwards), Kyūshū and Shikoku islands, usually growing alongside mountain streams.

== Characteristics ==
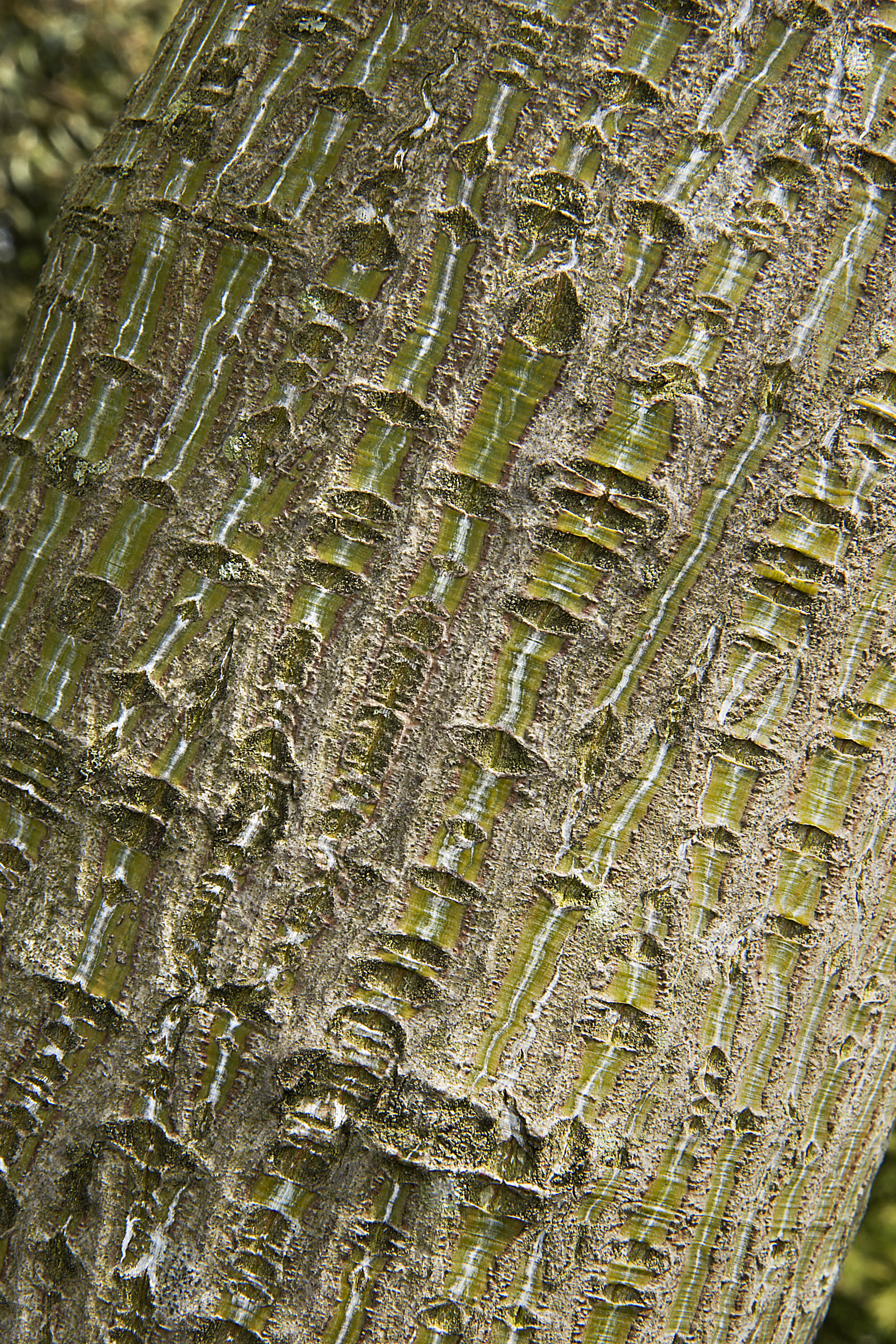
Bark

It is a small deciduous tree growing to 10–15 m (rarely to 20 m) tall with a trunk up to 70 cm diameter, though usually smaller and often with multiple trunks, and a spreading crown of long, slender branches. The bark is smooth, olive-green with regular narrow vertical white stripes and small horizontal brownish lenticels; it retains its pattern to the base even on old trees. The leaves are 10–15 cm long and 6–12 cm broad, with three or five lobes, the basal lobes of five-lobed leaves being small; they have a serrated margin, conspicuous veining, and a reddish 4–8 cm petiole. They are matt to sub-shiny green in summer, turning to bright yellow, orange or red in the autumn. The flowers are small, greenish-yellow, produced on 8–10 cm racemes in late spring, erect at first but becoming pendulous, with male and female flowers on different racemes. The samara nutlets are 5 mm long, with a 2 cm long wing.

It can be distinguished from the related Acer rufinerve (Japanese, ウリハダカエデ urihadakaede), with which it sometimes grows, by the reddish petioles, the hairless or only thinly hairy leaves (contrasting with the rufous hairs on the underside of A. rufinerve leaves), and in flowering later in spring well after the leaves appear.

== Cultivation and uses ==
It is grown as an ornamental tree for its striped bark and good autumn foliage. When grown together with its close relatives, it may be distinguished from them by the additional presence of small, rust-orange spots on the bark. Hybrids with A. davidii are frequent in cultivation.

This plant has gained the Royal Horticultural Society's Award of Garden Merit.
