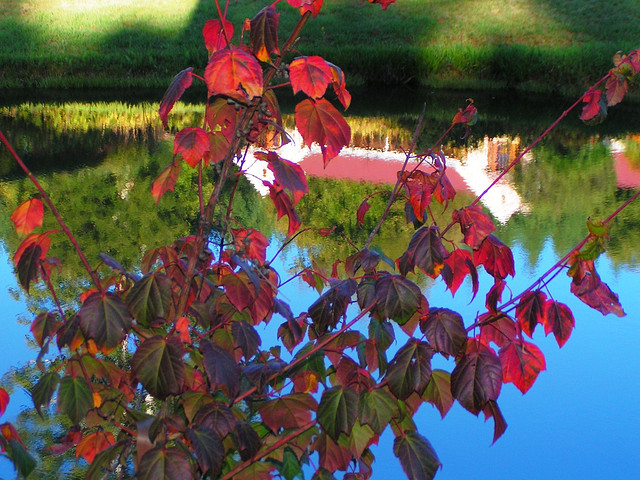
- Acer pectinatum ssp. forrestii, branchlets and autumn leaves with reflecting water in the background

Conservation status
- Least Concern (IUCN 3.1)

Scientific classification
- Kingdom: Plantae
- Clade: Tracheophytes
- Clade: Angiosperms
- Clade: Eudicots
- Clade: Rosids
- Order: Sapindales
- Family: Sapindaceae
- Genus: Acer
- Section: Acer sect. Macrantha
- Species: A. pectinatum

Binomial name
- Acer pectinatum Wall. ex G. Nicholson 1881 not Wall. ex Pax 1886

Synonyms
- List: Acer forrestii Diels; Acer laxiflorum Pax; Acer maximowiczii Pax; Acer urophyllum Maxim.; Acer chienii Hu & W.C.Cheng; Acer chloranthum Merr.; Acer taronense Hand.-Mazz.

= Acer pectinatum =

Species of maple

Acer pectinatum is an Asian species of maple that is native to the Himalayas and nearby mountains in southwestern China, Myanmar, and the northeastern part of the Indian Subcontinent. It is a spreading deciduous tree up to 20 m (66 ft) tall in the wild, with brown bark. The leaves are non-compound, leathery, up to 10 cm wide and 8 cm across, toothless, usually with 5 lobes but sometimes 3, the lobes toothed along the edges. The leaves of mature trees turn brilliant shades of yellow and orange before falling off in autumn.

== Subspecies ==
- Acer pectinatum subsp. forrestii (Diels) A.E.Murray - Sichuan, Yunnan
- Acer pectinatum subsp. laxiflorum (Pax) A.E.Murray - Sichuan, Yunnan
- Acer pectinatum subsp. maximowiczii (Pax) A.E.Murray - see Acer maximowiczii
- Acer pectinatum subsp. pectinatum - Tibet, Yunnan, Bhutan, Assam, Myanmar, Nepal
- Acer pectinatum subsp. taronense (Hub.-Mor.) A.E.Murray - Sichuan, Tibet, Yunnan, Bhutan, Assam, Myanmar
