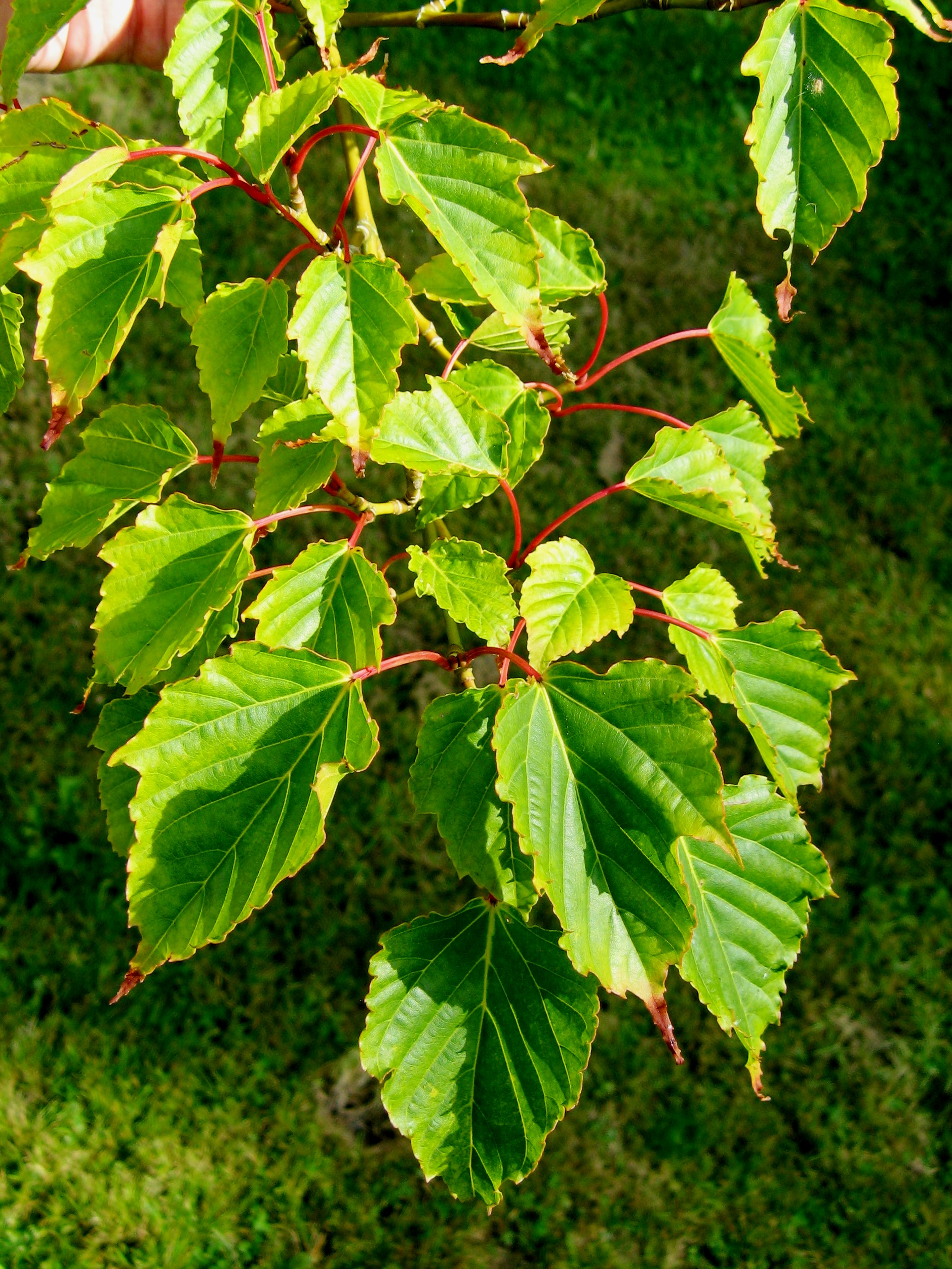
- Acer morrisonense foliage. Ventnor Botanic Garden

Scientific classification
- Kingdom: Plantae
- Clade: Tracheophytes
- Clade: Angiosperms
- Clade: Eudicots
- Clade: Rosids
- Order: Sapindales
- Family: Sapindaceae
- Genus: Acer
- Section: Acer sect. Macrantha
- Species: A. morrisonense

Binomial name
- Acer morrisonense Hayata 1911

Synonyms
- Acer rubescens Hayata

= Acer morrisonense =

Species of maple

Acer morrisonense is an Asian species of maple found only in the mixed forests of eastern and southern Taiwan, at elevations of 1800 – 2200 m. The species is sometimes confused with another Taiwanese tree, Acer caudatifolium.

== Description ==
Acer morrisonense is a tree growing to 20 m tall, with a smooth, yellowish-grey bark. The branchlets are glabrous, bearing deciduous leaves with petioles 5–7 cm non-compound, the leaf blade suborbicular-ovate, 8-10 × 6-8 cm, papery, adaxially glabrous, 5-veined at the base which is nearly truncate or subcordate, the margin doubly serrate with coarse acute teeth, shallowly 5-lobed, to 1/5 width of blade. The distinctive middle lobe is shortly ovate, the apex acuminate. The flowers are racemose, 15 in number, and appear during March and April in Taiwan. The fruits are small, yellowish-brown, and ripen in October.

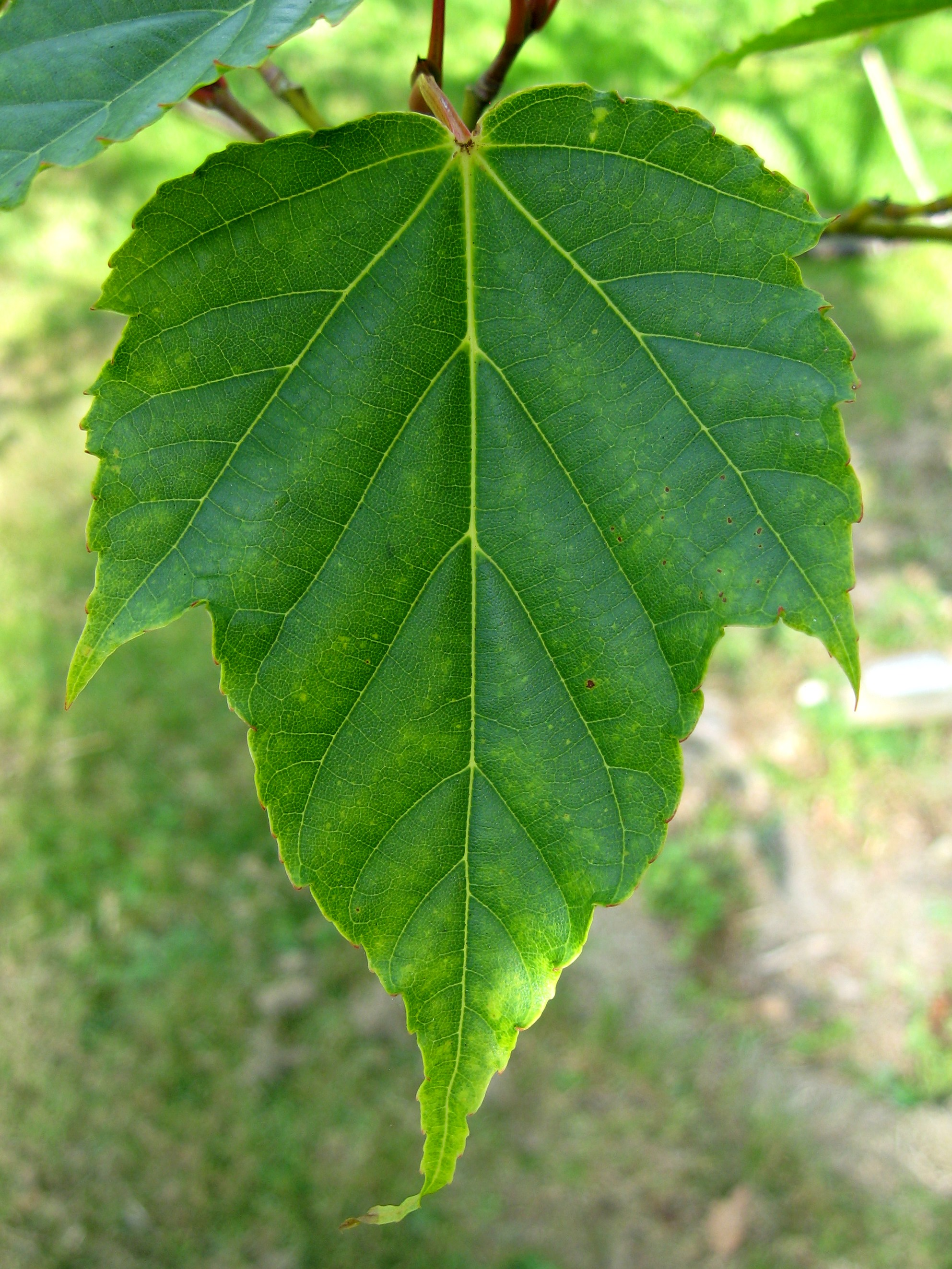
Acer morrisonense leaf. Ventnor Botanic Garden
