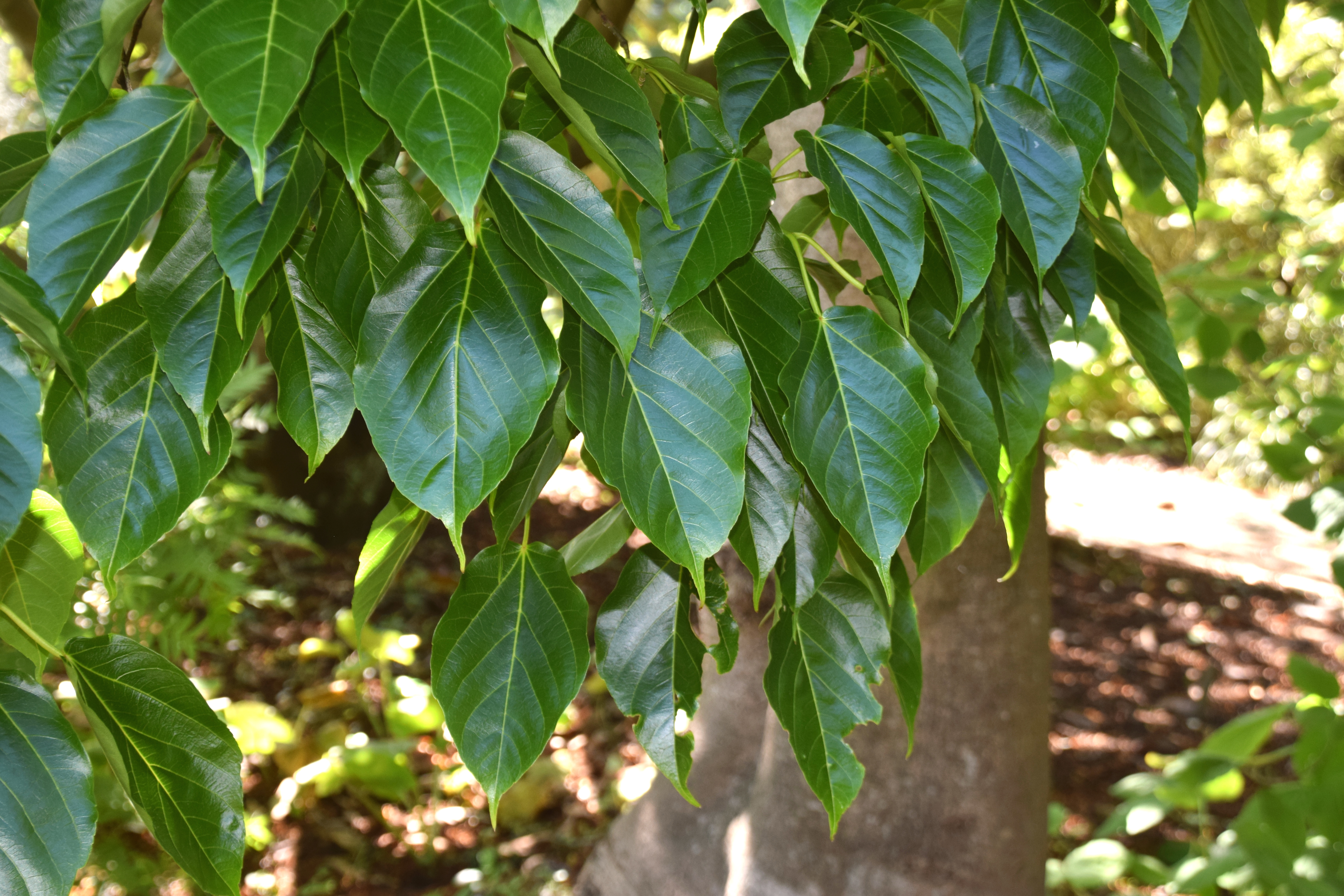
- Acer sikkimense in Dunedin Botanic Garden.

Conservation status
- Least Concern (IUCN 3.1)

Scientific classification
- Kingdom: Plantae
- Clade: Tracheophytes
- Clade: Angiosperms
- Clade: Eudicots
- Clade: Rosids
- Order: Sapindales
- Family: Sapindaceae
- Genus: Acer
- Section: Acer sect. Macrantha
- Species: A. sikkimense

Binomial name
- Acer sikkimense Miq. 1867

Synonyms
- List: Acer hookeri Miq.; Acer kiangsiense W.P.Fang & M.Y.Fang; Acer metcalfii Rehder

= Acer sikkimense =

Species of maple

Acer sikkimense is a rare Asian species of maple. It is native to the Himalayas and nearby mountains in Sikkim, Bhutan, Nepal, northern India, Myanmar, Tibet, and Yunnan.

Acer sikkimense is a deciduous tree up to 20 meters tall with dark gray bark. Leaves are non-compound, up to 14 cm wide and 8 cm across, thin and papery, with no lobes, but sometimes with small teeth along the edges.
