= Eremochen =

Eremochen Temporal range: Miocene 23–13.6 Ma

Scientific classification
- Kingdom: Animalia
- Phylum: Chordata
- Class: Aves
- Order: Anseriformes
- Family: Anatidae
- Subfamily: Anserinae
- Genus: †Eremochen; Brodkorb, 1961

Type species
- †Eremochen russelli Brodkorb, 1961

Extinct genus of birds

Eremochen is an extinct genus of water bird, belonging to the Anserinae subfamily, which includes modern true geese and swans. The genus was described in 1961 by Pierce Brodkorb, from remains discovered in 1955 in the Juntura Formation of Oregon. It was slightly smaller than the extant Atlantic Canada goose. The referred material includes its holotype, the proximal portion of a left humerus, alongside portions of a right scapula, a right carpometacarpus, and a right tibiotarsus.

The genus name, Eremochen, is composed of the Greek prefix Eremos-, meaning "desert", and -chen, meaning "goose". The species name, russelli, was given to honour the paleontologist Donald E. Russell.
