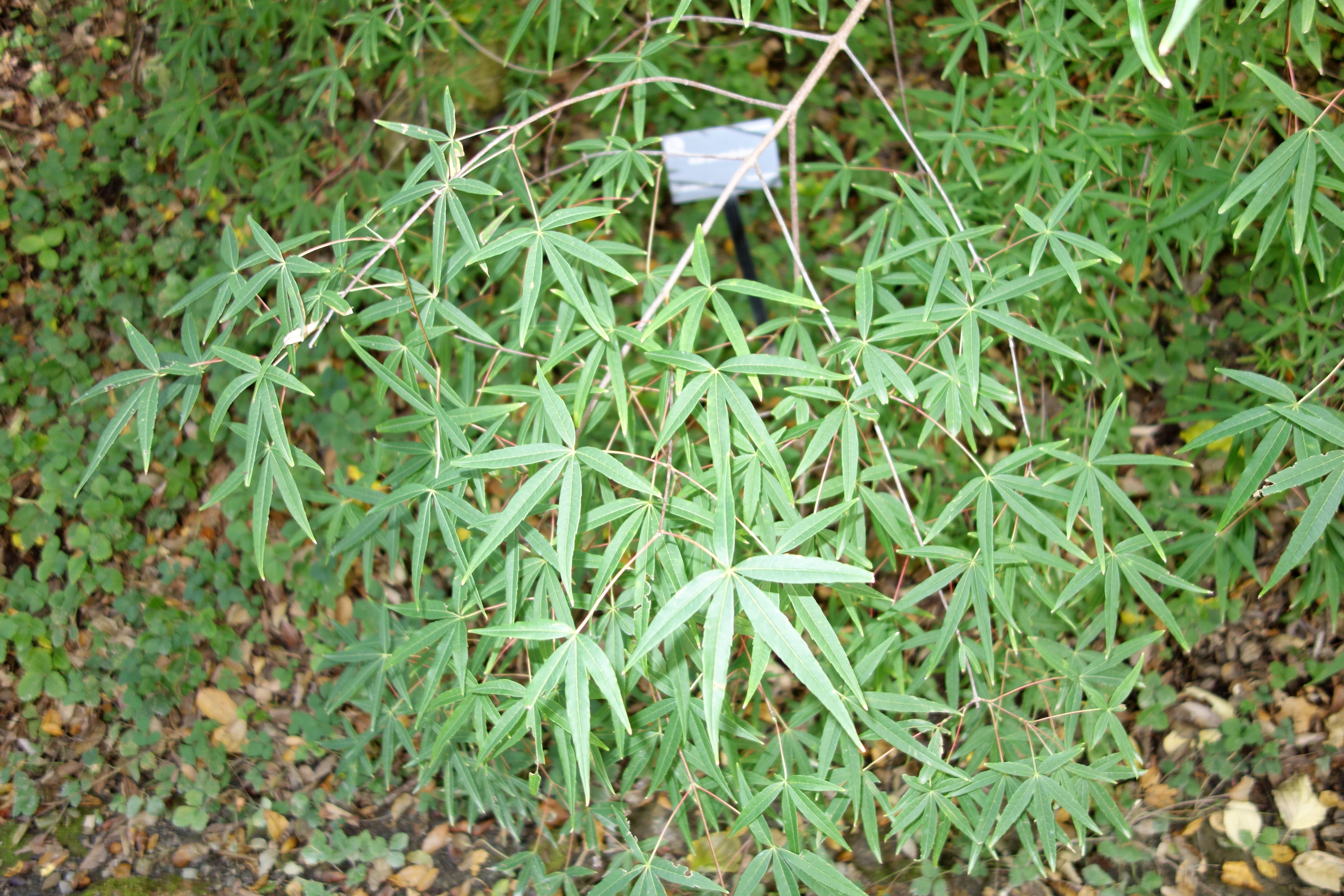
- Acer pentaphyllum in the Quarryhill Botanical Garden

Conservation status
- Critically Endangered (IUCN 3.1)

Scientific classification
- Kingdom: Plantae
- Clade: Tracheophytes
- Clade: Angiosperms
- Clade: Eudicots
- Clade: Rosids
- Order: Sapindales
- Family: Sapindaceae
- Genus: Acer
- Section: Acer sect. Pentaphylla
- Series: Acer ser. Pentaphylla
- Species: A. pentaphyllum

Binomial name
- Acer pentaphyllum Diels 1931

= Acer pentaphyllum =

Species of maple

Acer pentaphyllum (五小叶槭 wu xiao ye qi) is a very rare, endangered maple species endemic to southwestern Sichuan in China, at elevations of 2300–2900 meters.

Acer pentaphyllum is a deciduous tree that grows to 10 meters in height. Leaves are palmately compound hairless, usually with 5 lobes but sometimes with 4 or 7. Leaflet are 5-8 × 1.5–2 cm, narrowly lanceolate or lanceolate.

== Conservation ==
Acer pentaphyllum is listed as "critically endangered" on the Red List of Threatened Species by the IUCN with a recorded population of less than 500 plants left in the wild. Experts believe that survival is threatened by a combination of factors, including habitat loss, animal grazing, the harvest of woody fuel by local farmers, and fragmentation. Several concerned individuals and organizations have been working to ensure this species is conserved and saved from extinction. Most of these works done by experts to conserve this species include the establishment of ex situ conservation sites and Environmental Public Interest Litigation Cases on behalf of this species. The UBC Botanic Garden established an ex situ conservation site at the UBC Botanic Garden for the conservation of this critically endangered Acer Pentaphyllum species. Also in China, an organization known as the China Biodiversity Conservation and Green Development Foundation (CBCGDF) is one of the organizations in China working to conserve this plant species. An example includes the establishment of ex situ conservation sites through (Community Conservation Area(CCAfa)) at 3 different regions in China such as Tianshui, Lanzhou and Xing'an Meng. CBCGDF filed a civil public interest environmental lawsuit against a hydropower company for potentially threatening the survival of the plant by building a new power station in southwest China. The Garze intermediate court accepted the case in Dec. 2015.
