= Acer maximowiczii =

Scientific classification
- Kingdom: Plantae
- Clade: Tracheophytes
- Clade: Angiosperms
- Clade: Eudicots
- Clade: Rosids
- Order: Sapindales
- Family: Sapindaceae
- Genus: Acer
- Section: Acer sect. Macrantha
- Species: A. maximowiczii

Binomial name
- Acer maximowiczii Pax 1899

Synonyms
- Acer maximowiczii subsp. porphyrophyllum W.P.Fang; Acer pectinatum subsp. maximowiczii (Pax) A.E.Murray; Acer urophyllum Maxim.

Species of plant

Acer maximowiczii is an Asian species of maple. It has been found only in China (Gansu, Guangxi, Guizhou, Henan, Hubei, Hunan, Qinghai, Shaanxi, Shanxi, Sichuan).

Acer maximowiczii is a tree up to 12 meters tall, with dark brown bark. Leaves are non-compound, thin and papery, up to 11 cm wide and 9 cm across, with 5 lobes and double teeth.
