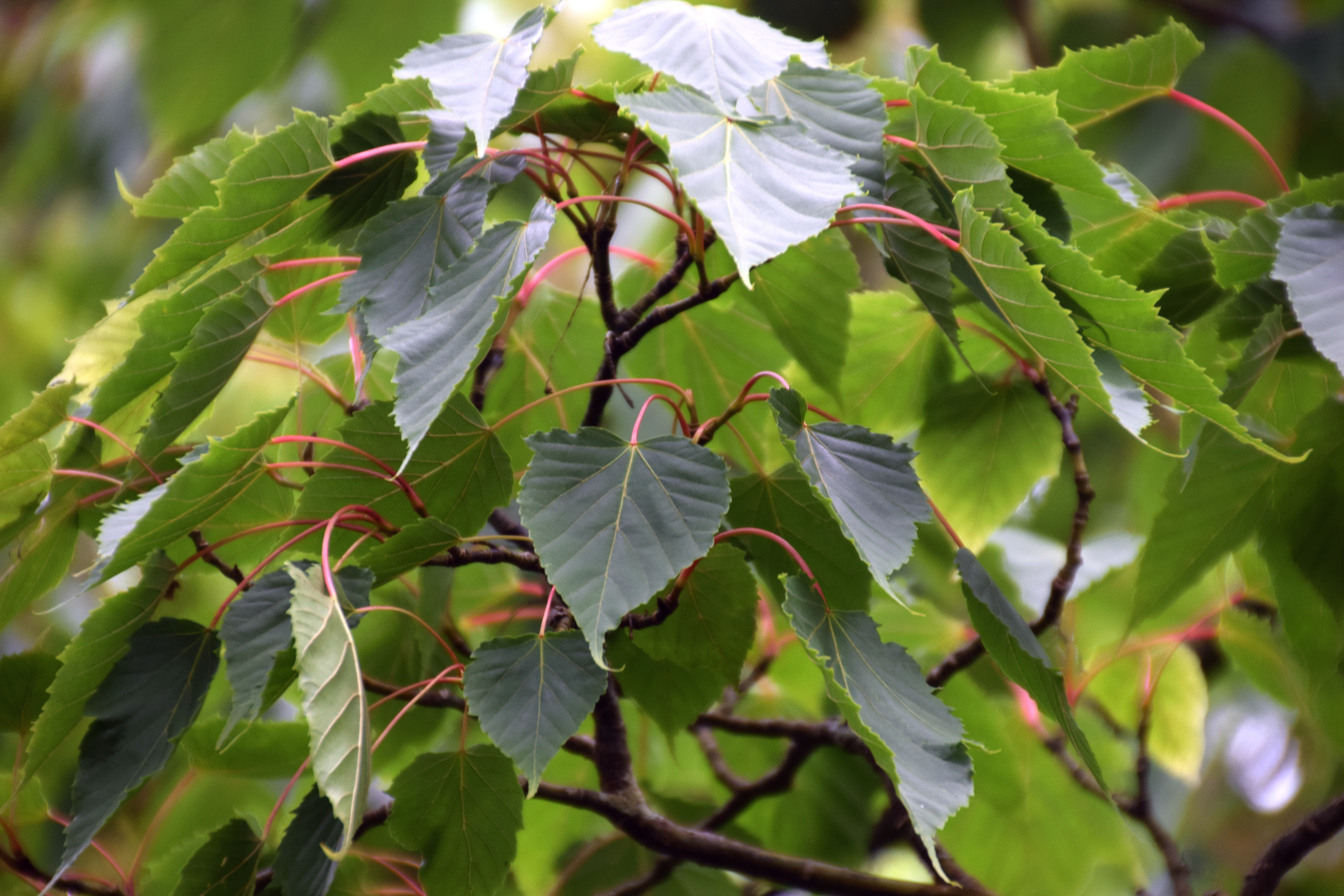

Conservation status
- Least Concern (IUCN 3.1)

Scientific classification
- Kingdom: Plantae
- Clade: Tracheophytes
- Clade: Angiosperms
- Clade: Eudicots
- Clade: Rosids
- Order: Sapindales
- Family: Sapindaceae
- Genus: Acer
- Section: Acer sect. Macrantha
- Species: A. caudatifolium

Binomial name
- Acer caudatifolium Hayata (1911)

Synonyms
- List: Acer kawakamii Koidz. (1911); Acer kawakamii var. taiton-montanum (Hayata) H.L.Li (1952); Acer ovatifolium Koidz. (1911); Acer pectinatum subsp. formosanum A.E.Murray (1977); Acer taiton-montanum Hayata (1913)

= Acer caudatifolium =

Species of maple

Acer caudatifolium is an Asian species of maple, found only in Taiwan. The species is sometimes confused with another Taiwanese tree, Acer morrisonense. This species has been known to reach 20 metres tall. Leaves are non-compound, the blade narrowly ovate, up to 11 cm long by 4.5 cm wide, with serrate margins but no lobes.

== Description ==
This deciduous tree that can reach up to 20 m (66 ft) in height and has thin, glabrous branches. Its leaves are opposite, chartaceous, simple, ovate or ovate-elliptic, 6–10 cm (2.4–3.9 in) in length, and 3–5 cm (1.2–2.0 in) in width. The leaf base is rounded or slightly cordate with finely serrated margins, usually unlobed or shallowly 3-lobed, rarely conspicuously 3-5 lobed. Apex is caudate-acuminate. The adaxial surface of the leaf blade is green while the abaxial surface is light green. Unisexual flowers, monoecious; raceme inflorescence with either glabrous or short pubescence, approximately 5 cm (2.0 in) in length. Flowers are approximately 9 to 10 mm (0.35 to 0.39 in) in width, slender, and glabrous. Calyx has 5 ovate-lanceolate-shaped sepals and is glabrous. 5 White rhomboid petals with undulating margins. The floral disk is thick and shallowly 8-lobed. The pistil of the female flower has a distinct carpel, the ovary has a wing-like structure. The style is 2-fid, connate at the base and curved downward at the apex. The staminodes are about 2 mm (0.079 in) in length. The male flower has 8 stamens surrounding the floral disk, with filaments about 3 mm (0.12 in) in length. The staminodes are approximately 2 mm (0.079 in) in length. The male flower has 8 stamens surrounding the floral disk, with filaments approximately 3 mm (0.12 in) in length. The male flower has 8 stamens surrounding the floral disk, with filaments approximately 3 mm (0.12 in) in length. The mature samara is yellowish brown in color with sickle-shaped wings approximately 3 cm (1.2 in) in length. The angle between the two wings at the lower margin is approximately 120-130 degrees.

== Distribution and habitat ==
This species is endemic to Taiwan. It mainly grows at mid to high elevations in the forests of the Central Mountain Range, often mixed with hinoki cypress in the cloud zone. It is naturally distributed in the Yangmingshan in northern Taiwan at elevations of 650–900 meters.

== Taxonomy ==
There is some disagreement in this species' taxonomy with some sources listing it as Acer caudatifolium, while others as Acer kawakamii.

Acer kawakamii was named by Genichi Koidzumi in 1911 and was subsequently described and illustrated in later academic articles. No formal holotype was cited; the only mention was that the type specimen was collected from the temperate forest in Mt. Hakkutisan in Alishan. According to a study conducted by Chien-Yu Tseng in 2007, the selected type specimen (DB No. 01924) currently preserved in the University of Tokyo may likely be the species identified by Genichi Koidzumi. Due to the significant morphological variation, particularly in the number of leaf lobes and morphology, the species has been differentiated into different subspecies or varieties. Therefore, because of the difficulty in determining these characteristics, Tseng has suggested listing the species as a single species.
