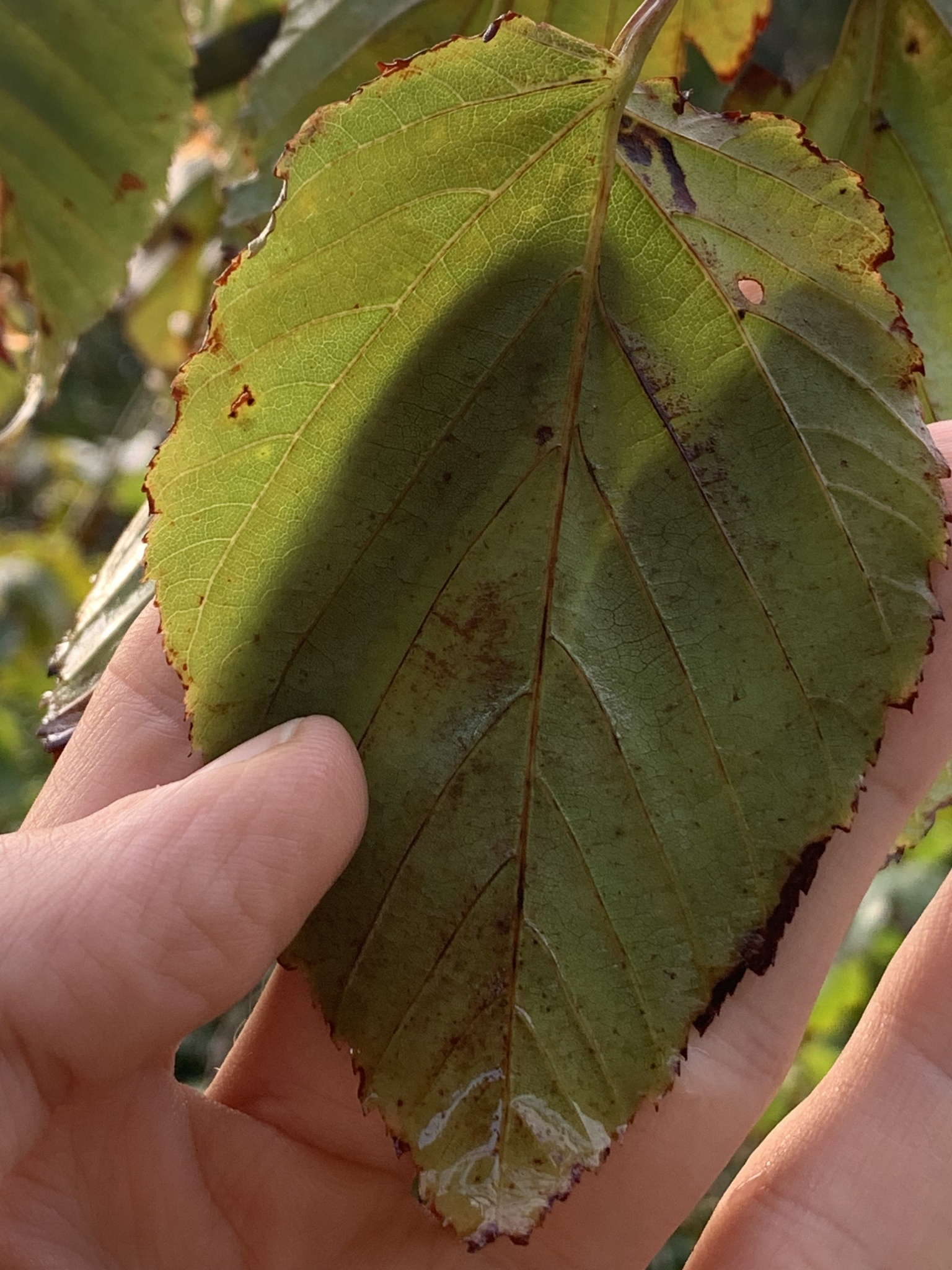

Conservation status
- Least Concern (IUCN 3.1)

Scientific classification
- Kingdom: Plantae
- Clade: Tracheophytes
- Clade: Angiosperms
- Clade: Eudicots
- Clade: Rosids
- Order: Sapindales
- Family: Sapindaceae
- Genus: Acer
- Species: A. morifolium

Binomial name
- Acer morifolium Koidz.

Synonyms
- Acer capillipes var. morifolium (Koidz.) Hatus.

= Acer morifolium =

Species of plant

Acer morifolium, the mulberry-leaf maple, is a species of flowering plant in the family Sapindaceae. It is endemic to the island of Yakushima, Japan. A tree reaching 10 m (33 ft), it is found in forests from sea level up to the highest point on the island; 1,936 m (6,350 ft). As its common and scientific names suggest, its leaves are very unlike most maples, and instead resemble the unlobed leaves of mulberries. Although rare in commerce, and confined to a 505 km^{2} (195 sq mi) island in the wild, it is assessed as Least Concern.
