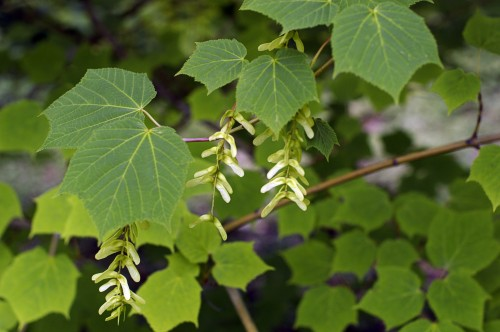

Conservation status
- Least Concern (IUCN 3.1)

Scientific classification
- Kingdom: Plantae
- Clade: Tracheophytes
- Clade: Angiosperms
- Clade: Eudicots
- Clade: Rosids
- Order: Sapindales
- Family: Sapindaceae
- Genus: Acer
- Section: Acer sect. Macrantha
- Species: A. tegmentosum

Binomial name
- Acer tegmentosum Maxim 1856

Synonyms
- Acer pensylvanicum var. tegmentosum (Maxim.) Wesm.; Acer hersii Rehder; Acer pavolinii Pamp.

= Acer tegmentosum =

Species of maple

Acer tegmentosum, the Manchurian striped maple, is a species of deciduous tree in the maple genus, which is native to the southern part of the Russian Far East (along the Amur and Ussuri rivers in Primorsky Krai), northeastern China (Heilongjiang, Jilin, Liaoning), and Korea.

Acer tegmentosum is cold-hardy down to USDA hardiness zone 5a (−29 °C). At maturity (20-plus years) it can reach a height of 10–15 metres (33–49 ft) and a spread of 8 metres (26 ft), with greenish-grey bark with bright white stripes. Leaves are simple, each up to 12 cm across, round in general outline but with 3 shallow lobes (sometimes with two small additional lobes near the base), and doubly toothed edges. The green leaves turn bright yellow before falling in autumn. Pendulous racemes of yellow-green flowers 7–10 cm long give way to samaras that are 1.1-1.3 cm long.

In cultivation in the UK it has gained the Royal Horticultural Society's Award of Garden Merit. Cultivars include 'Joe Witt', 'Valley Phantom', and 'White Tigress'.

Though generally not considered a concern for conservationists, it was listed as "vulnerable" in the 2004 Chinese Species Red List.
