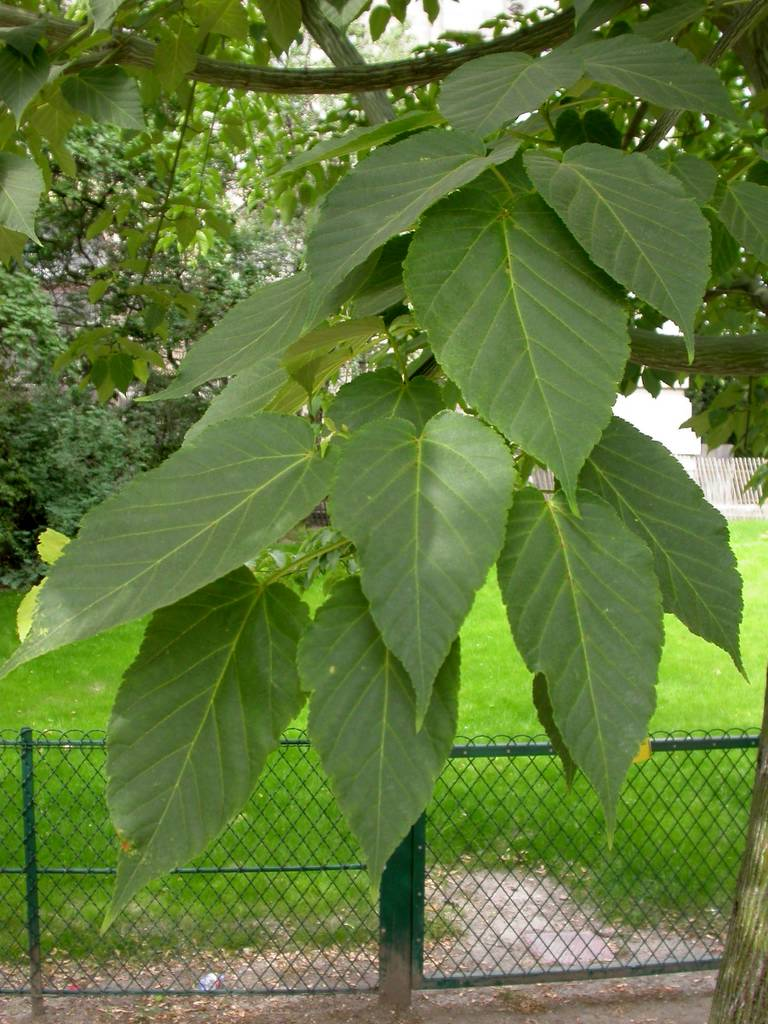
- Acer davidii subsp. davidii

Scientific classification
- Kingdom: Plantae
- Clade: Tracheophytes
- Clade: Angiosperms
- Clade: Eudicots
- Clade: Rosids
- Order: Sapindales
- Family: Sapindaceae
- Genus: Acer
- Section: Acer sect. Macrantha
- Species: A. davidii

Binomial name
- Acer davidii Franch.

Synonyms
- Acer cavaleriei H.Lév.; Acer horizontale Franch. ex W.P.Fang; Acer laxiflorum var. ningpoense Pax; Acer sikkimense subsp. davidii (Franch.) Wesm.

= Acer davidii =

Species of maple

Acer davidii, or Père David's maple, is a species of maple in the snakebark maple group. It is native to China, from Jiangsu south to Fujian and Guangdong, and west to southeastern Gansu and Yunnan.

The tree's initial discovery is attributed to an unknown Chinese individual, however it was French missionary Armand David who documented the species during his time in Central China at the request of the French government. The tree was later rediscovered by Charles Maries during his 1878 exploration of Jiangsu.

== Description ==
It is a small deciduous tree growing to 10–15 m tall with a trunk up to 40 cm in diameter, though usually smaller and often with multiple trunks, and a spreading crown of long, arching branches. The bark is smooth, olive-green with regular narrow pale vertical stripes on young trees, eventually becoming dull grey-brown at the base of old trees. The leaves are 6–18 cm long and 4–9 cm broad, with a petiole 3–6 cm long; they are dark green above, paler below, ovate, unlobed or weakly three-lobed, with a serrated margin. They turn to bright yellow, orange or red in the autumn. The flowers are small, yellow, with five sepals and petals about 4 mm long; they are produced on arching to pendulous 7–12 cm racemes in late spring, with male and female flowers on different racemes. The samara nutlets are 7–10 mm long and 4–6 mm broad, with a wing 2–3 cm long and 5 mm broad.

== Subspecies and cultivars ==
There are two subspecies, often treated as a distinct species:

- Acer davidii subsp. davidii. Père David's maple. Bark greenish-brown with white stripes. Shoots pinkish-green. Leaf petiole pink to red; leaf margin usually single-serrate with variably-sized serrations.
- Acer davidii subsp. grosseri (Pax) de Jong. Hers's maple (Acer grosseri Pax; syn. Acer hersii Rehd.) - bark green with white to pale green stripes. Shoots green. Leaf petiole green; leaf margin more often three-lobed and double-serrate.

Along with A. rufinerve, the two subspecies of Père David's maple are among the most commonly cultivated snakebark maples. Both are relatively hardy and fast-growing.

Among the cultivars of A. davidii are:-

- 'Canton' (a Dutch cultivar with a purplish hue to its green stripes)
- 'George Forrest' (a Scottish cultivar with large leaves and dark red young shoots - this cultivar has gained the Royal Horticultural Society's Award of Garden Merit)
- 'Ernest Wilson' (a specimen of which may be viewed in the Westonbirt Arboretum in England)
- 'Serpentine' (a cultivar with distinctively small, narrow leaves)

In some cases, these cultivars cannot be assigned to one subspecies or the other but are simply considered cultivars of A. davidii.

== Gallery ==
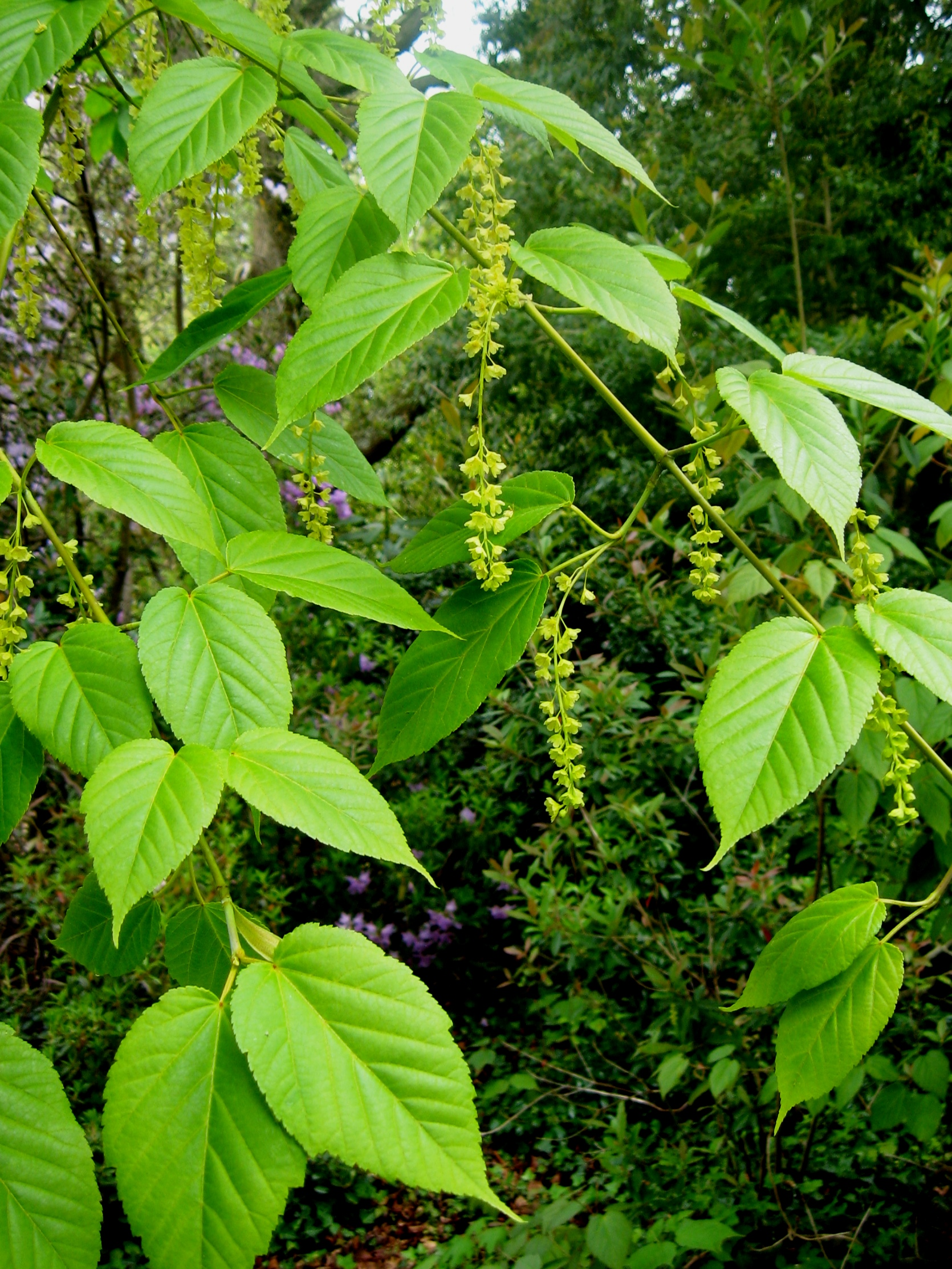
Acer davidii emergent flowers and foliage

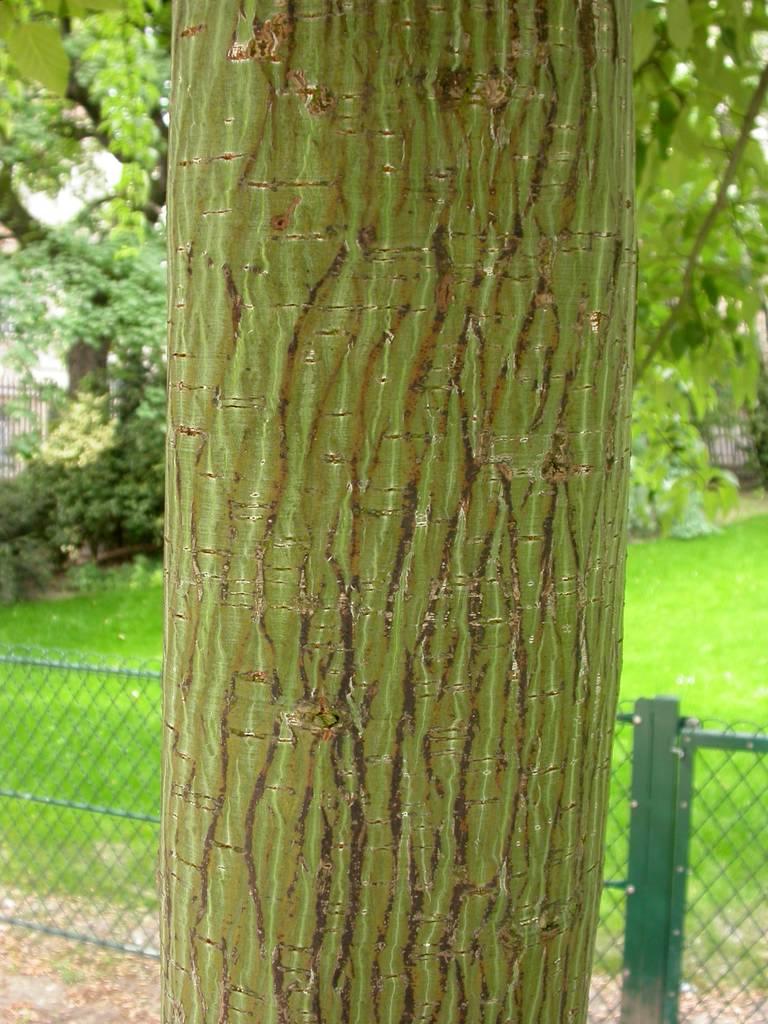
Acer davidii subsp. davidii

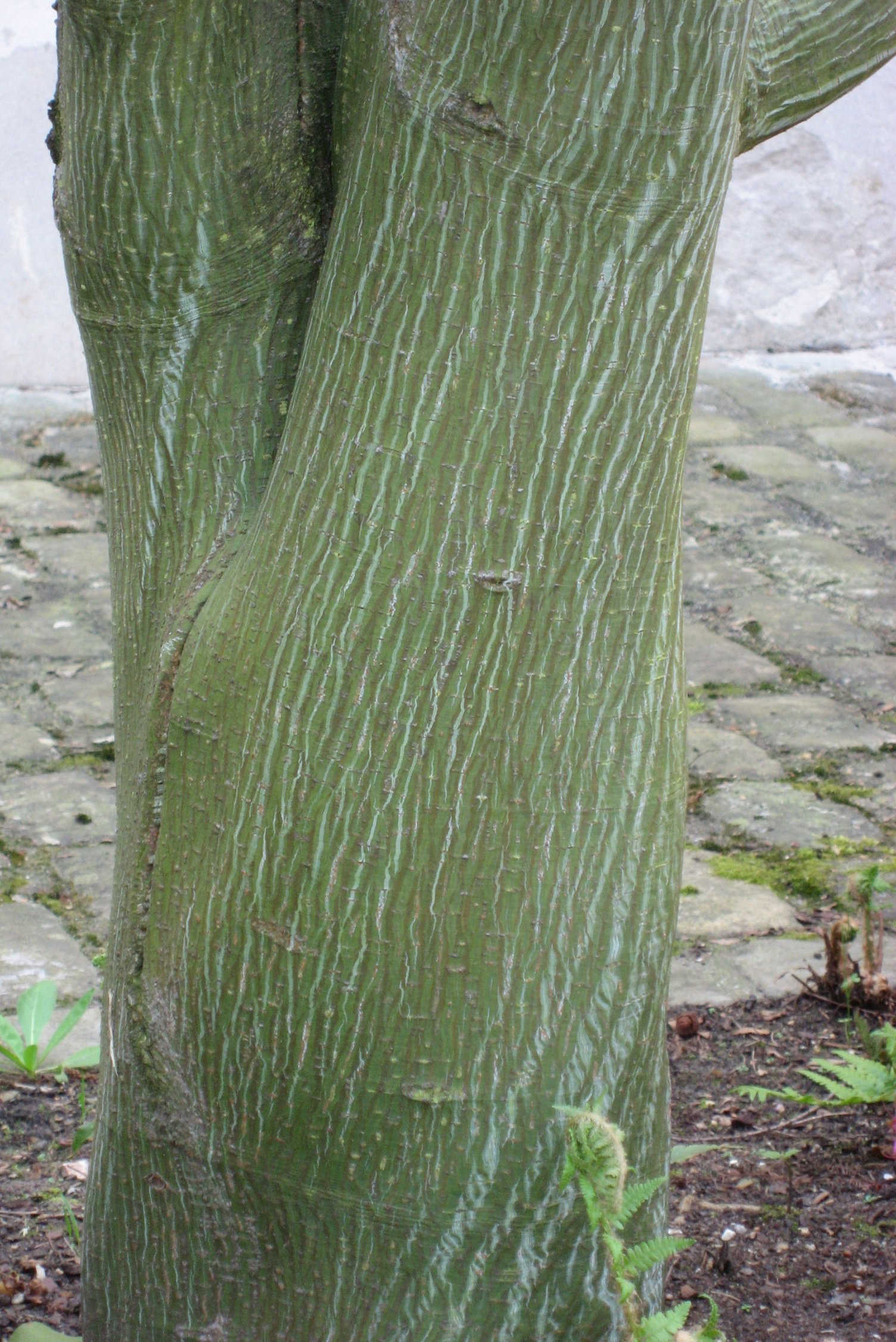
Bark of cultivar 'Ernest Wilson'

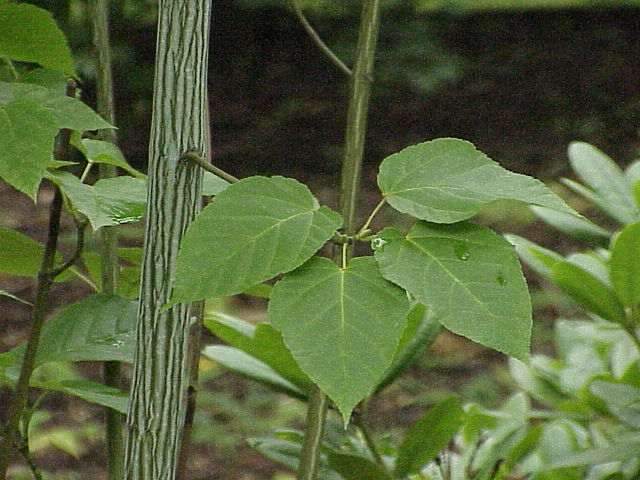
Acer davidii subsp. grosseri

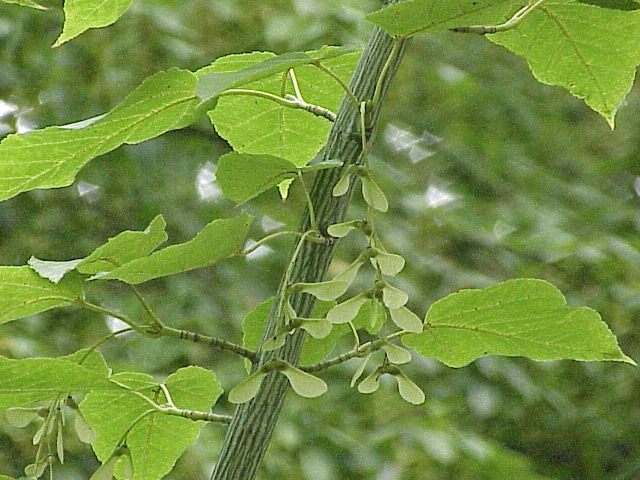
Acer davidii subsp. grosseri

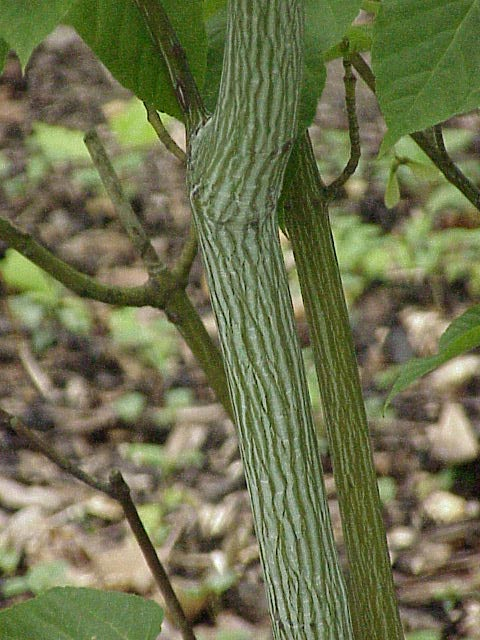
Acer davidii subsp. grosseri
