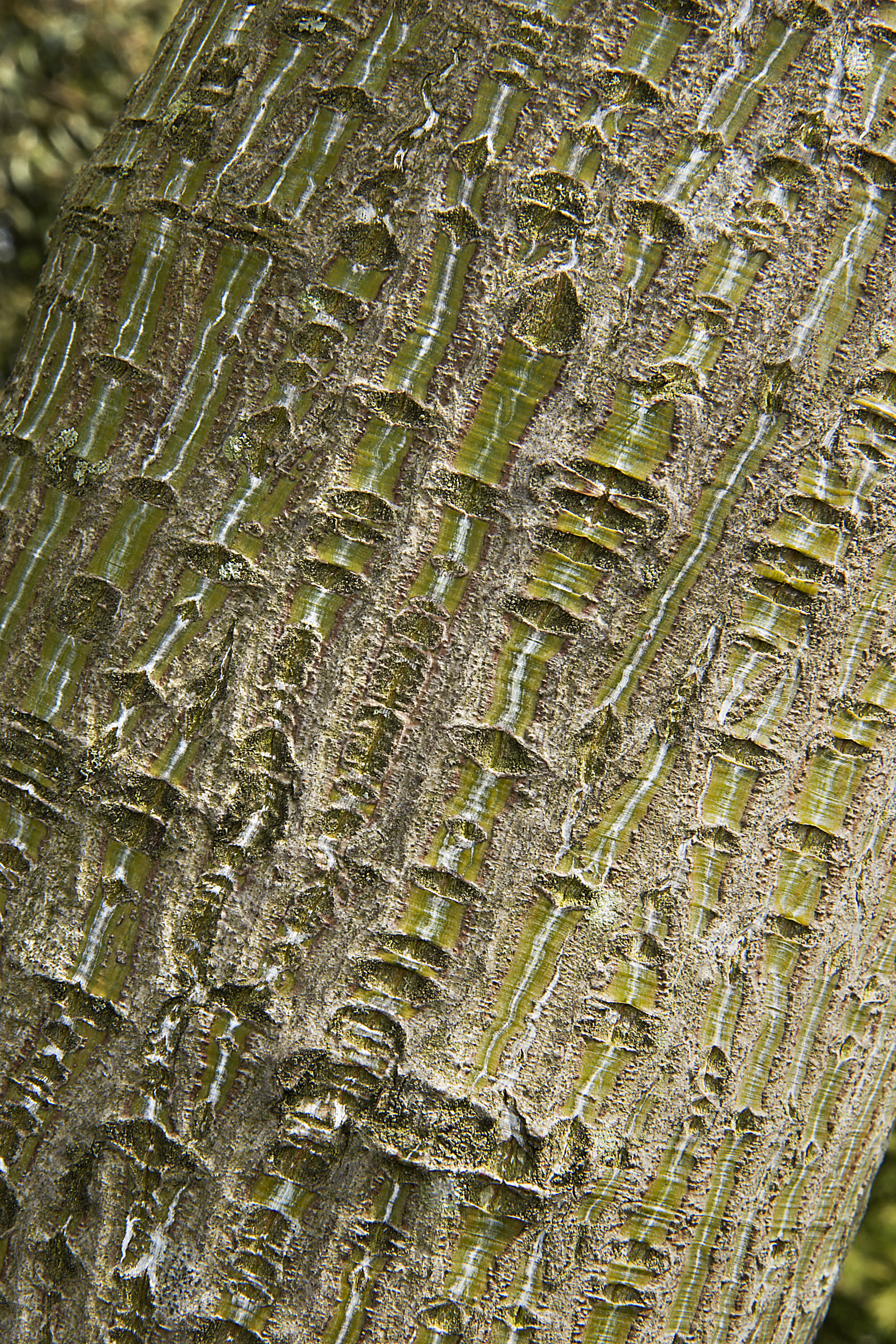
- Bark of Acer capillipes (red snakebark maple)

Scientific classification
- Kingdom: Plantae
- Clade: Tracheophytes
- Clade: Angiosperms
- Clade: Eudicots
- Clade: Rosids
- Order: Sapindales
- Family: Sapindaceae
- Genus: Acer
- Section: Acer sect. Macrantha; Pax

Species
- See text

= Snakebark maple =

Snakebark maples

Group of maple trees

Snakebark maples are maples belonging to the taxonomic section Acer sect. Macrantha. The section includes 18–21 species, and is restricted to eastern Asia (the eastern Himalaya east to Japan) with the exception of one species in eastern North America.

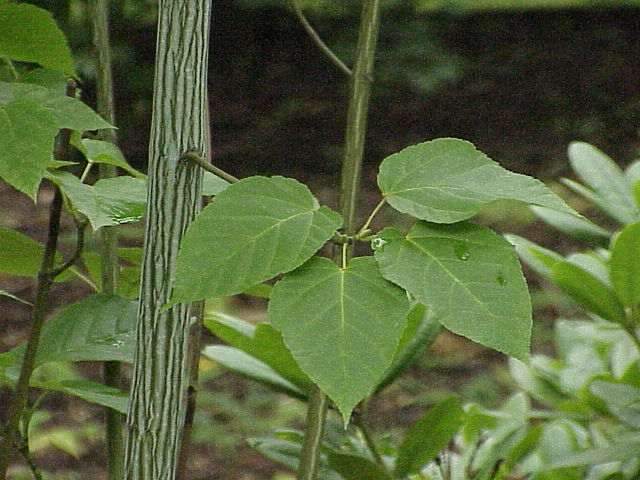
Acer davidii subsp. grosseri

The various species of snakebark maples are most easily distinguished from other maples by their distinctive bark, smooth (at least on young trees), and usually patterned with vertical dark green to greenish-brown stripes alternating with stripes of light green, pinkish or white, sometimes with a bluish tone. Other characters include stalked buds with just one pair of scales, and flowers on arching to pendulous racemes. The samaras are small, and often numerous. They are small deciduous trees, typically 5–15 m tall, rarely to 20 m tall, fast-growing when young but soon slowing down with age, and often short-lived; they typically occur as understorey trees in mountain forests, often along streamsides.

Species

- Acer capillipes - Kyushu maple, red snakebark maple
- Acer caudatifolium
- Acer × conspicuum - snakebark maple, a garden hybrid
- Acer crataegifolium - hawthorn-leaf maple
- Acer davidii (syn. A. grosseri, A. hersii, A. laisuense) - Père David's maple, Hers's maple
- Acer forrestii
- Acer laxiflorum
- Acer maximowiczii - Maximowicz's snakebark maple
- Acer metcalfii
- Acer micranthum
- Acer morifolium
- Acer morrisonense (syn. A. rubescens)
- Acer pectinatum (syn. A. taronense)
- Acer pensylvanicum - striped maple, the only non-Asian species
- Acer rufinerve - redvein maple
- Acer sikkimense (syn. A. hookeri)
- Acer tschonoskii (syn. A. komarovii)
- Acer tegmentosum

Some have good fall color with tones of reds and orange, while others tend toward a pale yellow which is less impressive. All are relatively hardy compared to many other species of maples, and many are widely cultivated as ornamental trees for their bark. Several cultivars and hybrids have been developed in cultivation.

== See also ==
- List of Acer species
