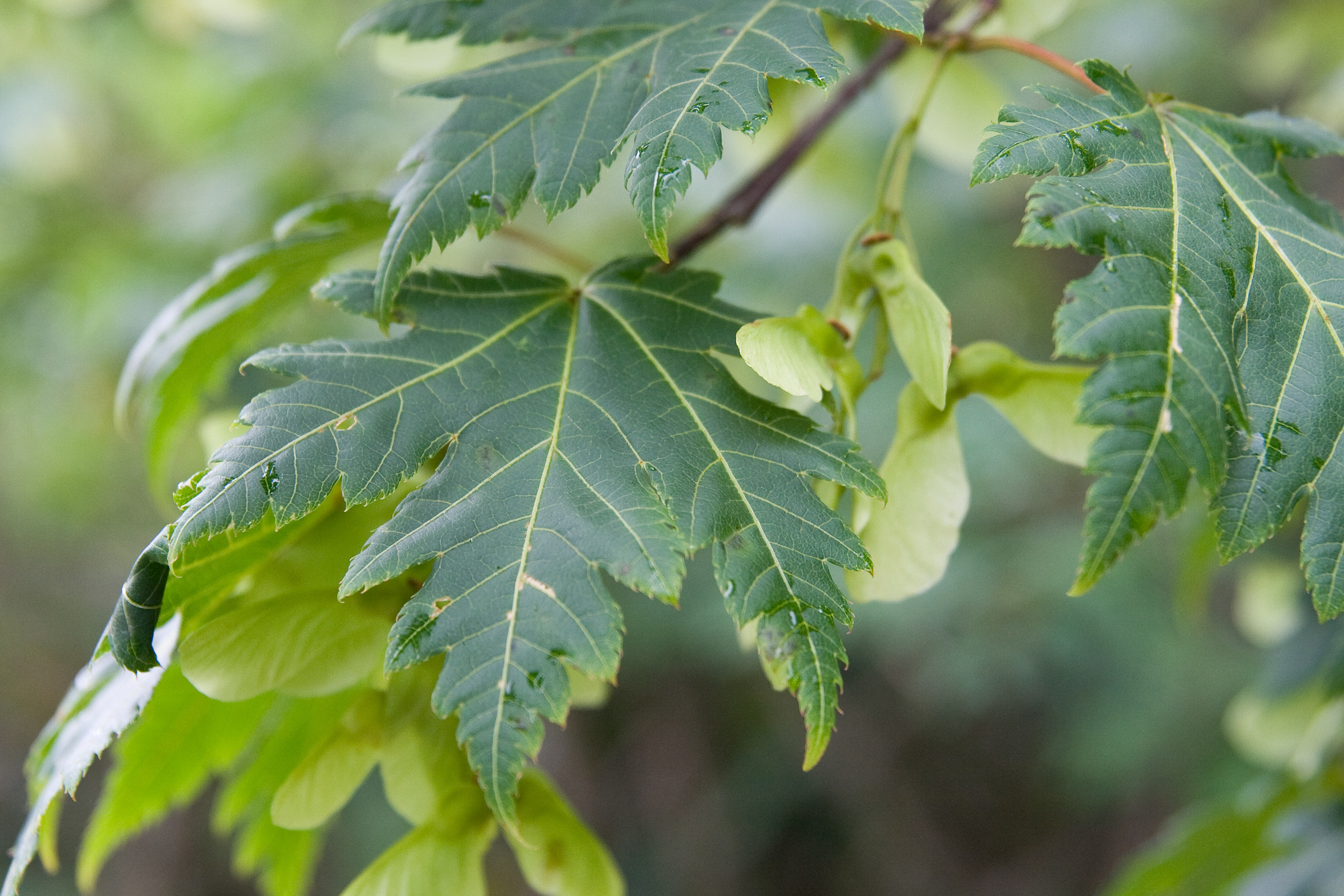

Scientific classification
- Kingdom: Plantae
- Clade: Embryophytes
- Clade: Tracheophytes
- Clade: Spermatophytes
- Clade: Angiosperms
- Clade: Eudicots
- Clade: Rosids
- Order: Sapindales
- Family: Sapindaceae
- Genus: Acer
- Section: Acer sect. Macrantha
- Species: A. tschonoskii

Binomial name
- Acer tschonoskii Maxim.

Synonyms
- Acer pellucidobracteatum H.Lév. & Vaniot

= Acer tschonoskii =

Species of flowering plant

Acer tschonoskii (in Japanese ミネカエデ, Mine-kaede, lit. 'ridge maple'), the butterfly maple or Tschonoski's maple, is a species of shrub or small tree native to Japan and the Kuril Islands. It is one of the least invasive, easiest to grow, and hardiest species of maples, but remains rarely used in gardens. A. tschonoskii naturally grows in subalpine habitats, at elevations between 1,400–2,500 m (4,600–8,200 ft). A. tschonoskii var. australe, (in Japanese ナンゴクミネカエデ, Nangoku-mine-kaede, lit. 'southern Tschonoski's maple'), a variety of A. tschonoskii, is distributed from Iwate Prefecture southward to Shikoku and Kyushu.
