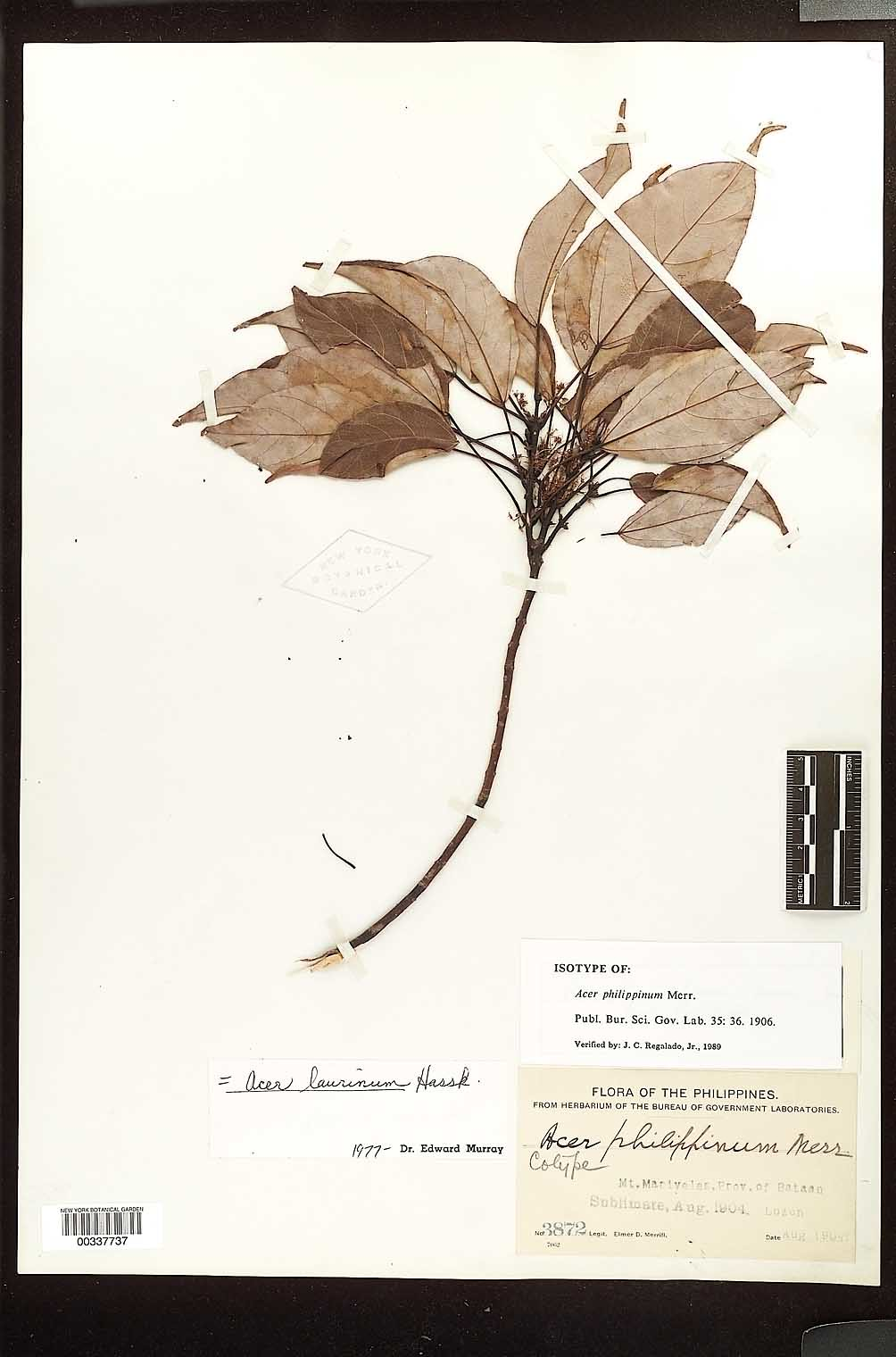

Conservation status
- Least Concern (IUCN 3.1)

Scientific classification
- Kingdom: Plantae
- Clade: Tracheophytes
- Clade: Angiosperms
- Clade: Eudicots
- Clade: Rosids
- Order: Sapindales
- Family: Sapindaceae
- Genus: Acer
- Section: Acer sect. Rubra
- Species: A. laurinum

Binomial name
- Acer laurinum Hassk.

Synonyms
- Acer cassiifolium Blume; Acer chionophyllum Merr.; Acer curranii Merr.; Acer decandrum Merr.; Acer garrettii Craib; Acer longicarpum Hu & W.C.Cheng; Acer philippinum Merr.

= Acer laurinum =

Species of maple

Acer laurinum, also known as laurel maple, is an evergreen Asian tree in the family Sapindaceae.

== Description ==
Acer laurinum reaches 40 metres (130 ft) in height. It has a trunk with scaly, red-brown bark. The leaves are glabrous, with no lobes or teeth. It has white flowers, followed by paired samaras. The species is dioecious, with separate male and female flowers.

== Distribution ==
Acer laurinum is the only member of its genus with native populations in the Southern Hemisphere, in Indonesia. The species is also native to Myanmar, Cambodia, India, Laos (Khammouan), Malaysia, Nepal, the Philippines, Thailand, and southwestern China (Guangxi, Hainan, Tibet, Yunnan).
