= List of Danish Acers =

This is a list of Acer (maple) species cultivated in Denmark. Native species are marked in bold.

- Acer aidzuense (A. ginnala var. aidzuense)
- Acer argutum
- Acer buergerianum
- Acer caesium
- **Acer campestre**
- Acer capillipes
- Acer cappadocicum
- Acer carpinifolium
- Acer caudatum var. ukurunduense (A. ukurundense)
- Acer circinatum
- Acer cissifolium
- Acer x coriaceum 'Macrophyllum' (A. monspessulanum x A. pseudoplatanus)
- Acer crataegifolium
- Acer davidii Zone 6 - 9, not hardy
- Acer diabolicum
- Acer ginnala
- Acer gyraldiz
- Acer glabrum
- Acer glabrum var. douglasii
- Acer granatense (A. opalus var. granatense)
- Acer grandidentatum
- Acer griseum
- Acer grosseri
- Acer grosseri var. hersii
- Acer heldreichii
- Acer henryi
- Acer hyrcanum
- Acer japonicum
- Acer japonicum 'Aconitifolium'
- Acer leucoderme
- Acer lobelii
- Acer macrophyllum
- Acer maximowicziana (A. nikoense)
- Acer meyrii
- Acer micranthum
- Acer mono
- Acer monspessulanum
- Acer negundo
- Acer negundo var. pseudocalifornicum
- Acer negundo var. violaceum
- Acer nigrum
- Acer opalus
- Acer opalus var. obtusatum (A. opalus ssp. obtusatum)
- Acer opalus var. opulifolium (A. opalus ssp. obtusatum)
- Acer opalus var. tomentosum
- Acer palmatum
- Acer palmatum var. amoenum
- Acer palmatum var. matsumurae
- Acer pensylvanicum
- **Acer platanoides**
- Acer pseudosieboldianum
- **Acer pseudoplatanus**
- Acer pseudoplatanus 'Prins Handjeri'
- Acer rufinerve
- Acer saccharinum
- Acer saccharinum 'Pyramidale'
- Acer saccharum
- Acer semenovii (A. tataricum ssp. semenovii)
- Acer shirasawanum
- Acer sieboldianum
- Acer spicatum
- Acer tataricum
- Acer tegmentosum
- Acer tenuifolium
- Acer tetramerum
- Acer tetramerum var. betulifolium
- Acer triflorum
- Acer truncatum
- Acer tschonoskii
- Acer turkestanicum
- Acer ukurunduense
- Acer velutinum
