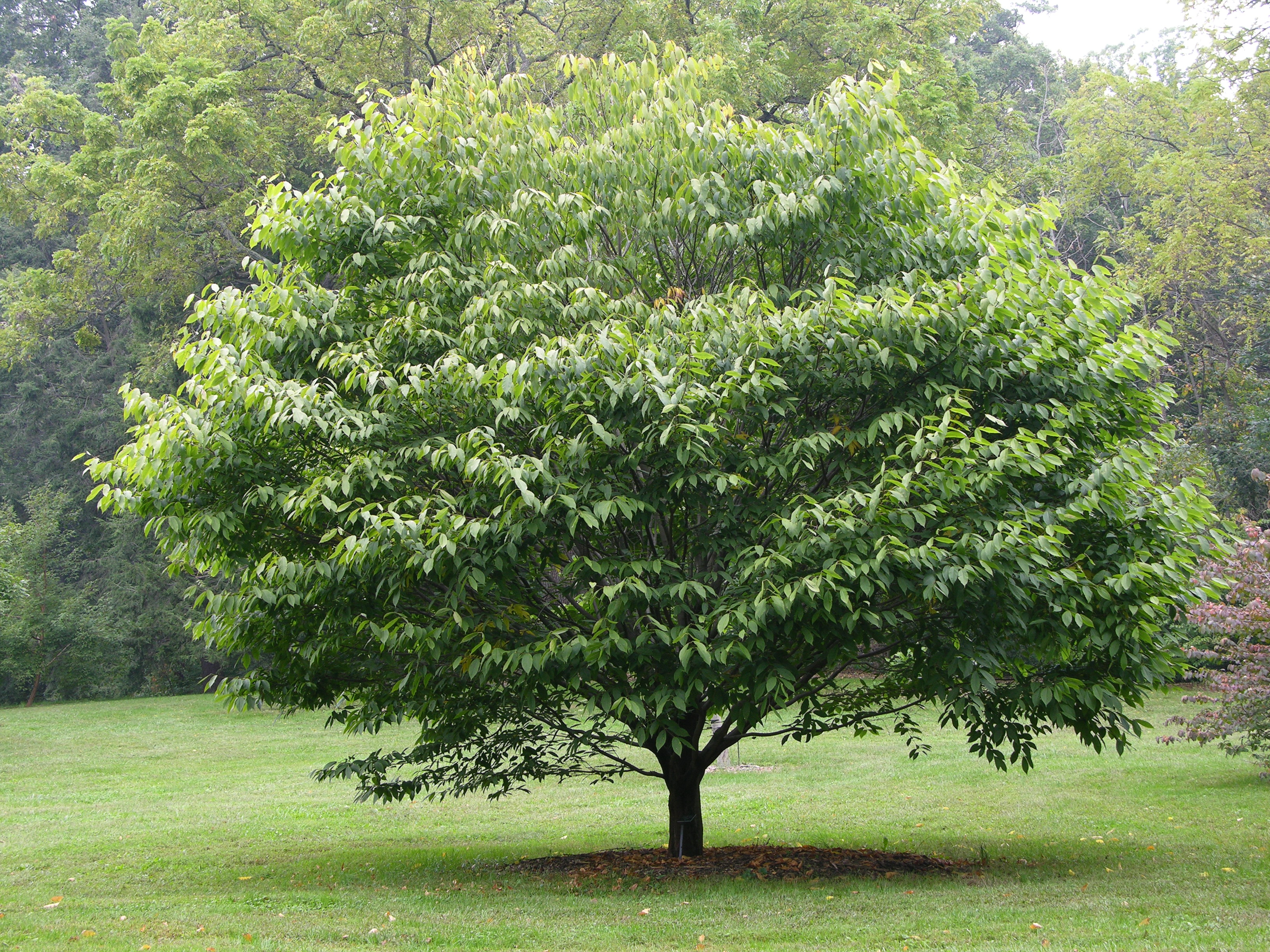

Conservation status
- Least Concern (IUCN 3.1)

Scientific classification
- Kingdom: Plantae
- Clade: Tracheophytes
- Clade: Angiosperms
- Clade: Eudicots
- Clade: Rosids
- Order: Sapindales
- Family: Sapindaceae
- Genus: Acer
- Section: Acer sect. indivisa
- Species: A. carpinifolium

Binomial name
- Acer carpinifolium Siebold & Zucc. 1845

= Acer carpinifolium =

Species of maple

Acer carpinifolium (hornbeam maple; Japanese: チドリノキ Chidorinoki "zigzag tree") is a species of maple native to Japan, on the islands of Honshū, Kyūshū, and Shikoku, where it grows in woodlands and alongside streams in mountainous areas.

== Description ==
It is a small deciduous tree growing to 10–15 m tall, with smooth, dark greenish-grey to grey-brown bark. The leaves are 7–15 cm long and 3–6 cm broad, simple, unlobed, and pinnately veined with 18–24 pairs of veins and a serrated margin. They resemble leaves of hornbeams more than they do other maples, except for being arranged in opposite pairs, and in the very small basal pair of veins being palmately arranged as in other maples. The flowers are 1 cm diameter, greenish yellow, produced in pendulous racemes 5–12 cm long in spring as the new leaves open; they are dioecious, with male and female flowers on separate trees. The fruit is a samara of two seeds each with a 2–3 cm long wing.

== Cultivation and uses ==
It is occasionally cultivated as an ornamental plant in temperate regions, mainly as a botanical curiosity to demonstrate the wide range of leaf morphology in the genus Acer, but also for its bright yellow autumn colour. Both the scientific and common names derive from the superficial resemblance of its leaves to those of the genus Carpinus (hornbeams).

== Gallery ==
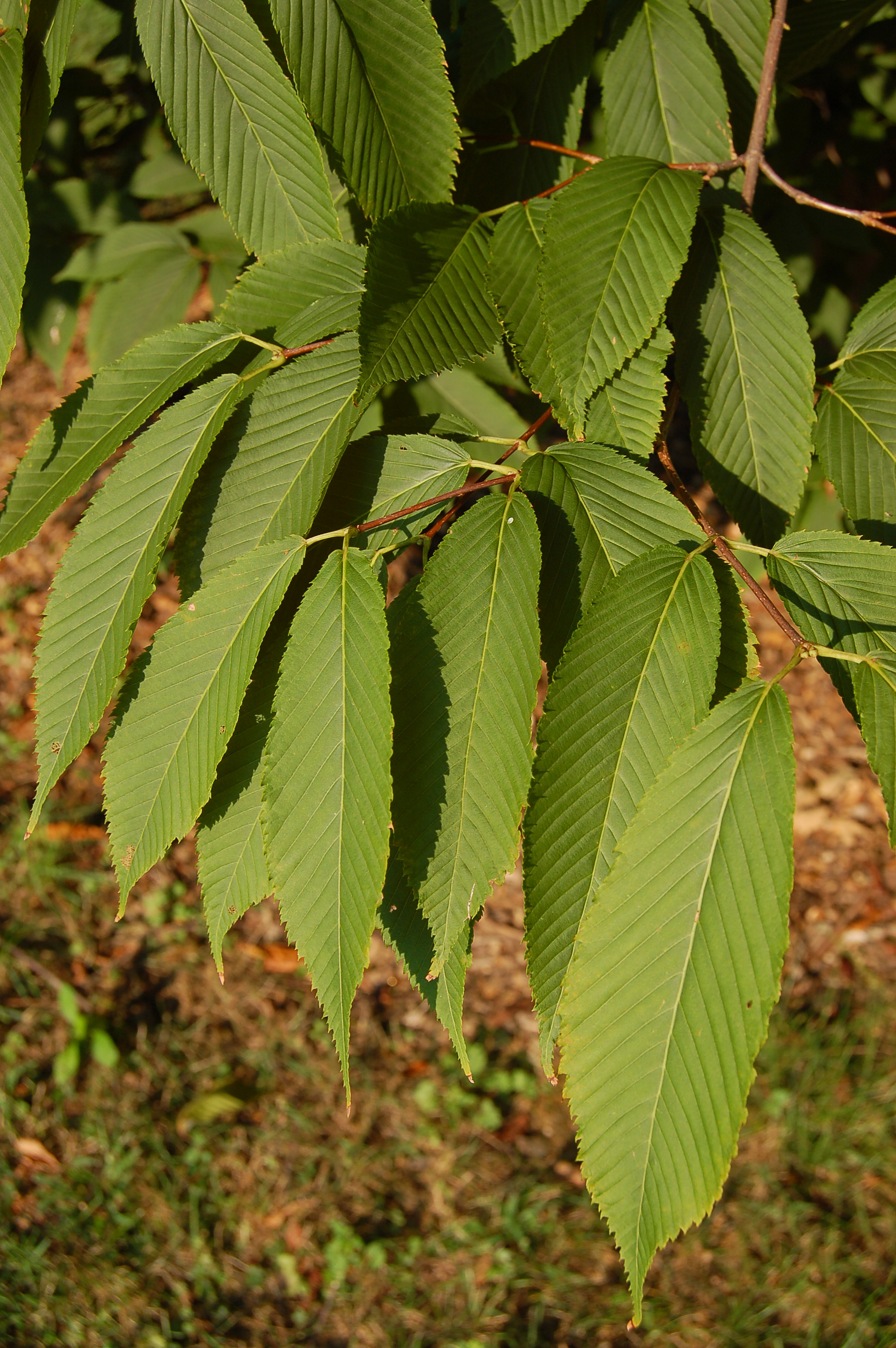
Foliage

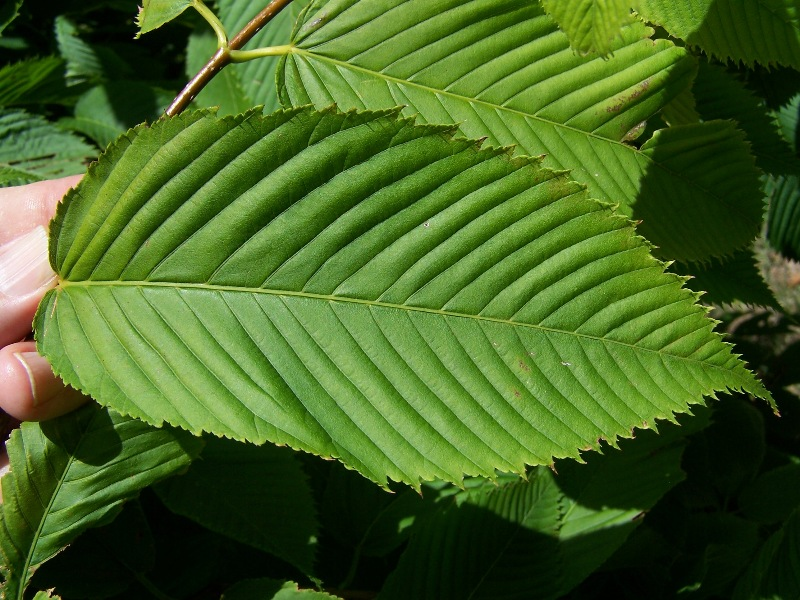
Leaves on a tree at the Morton Arboretum, accession 6-61-4

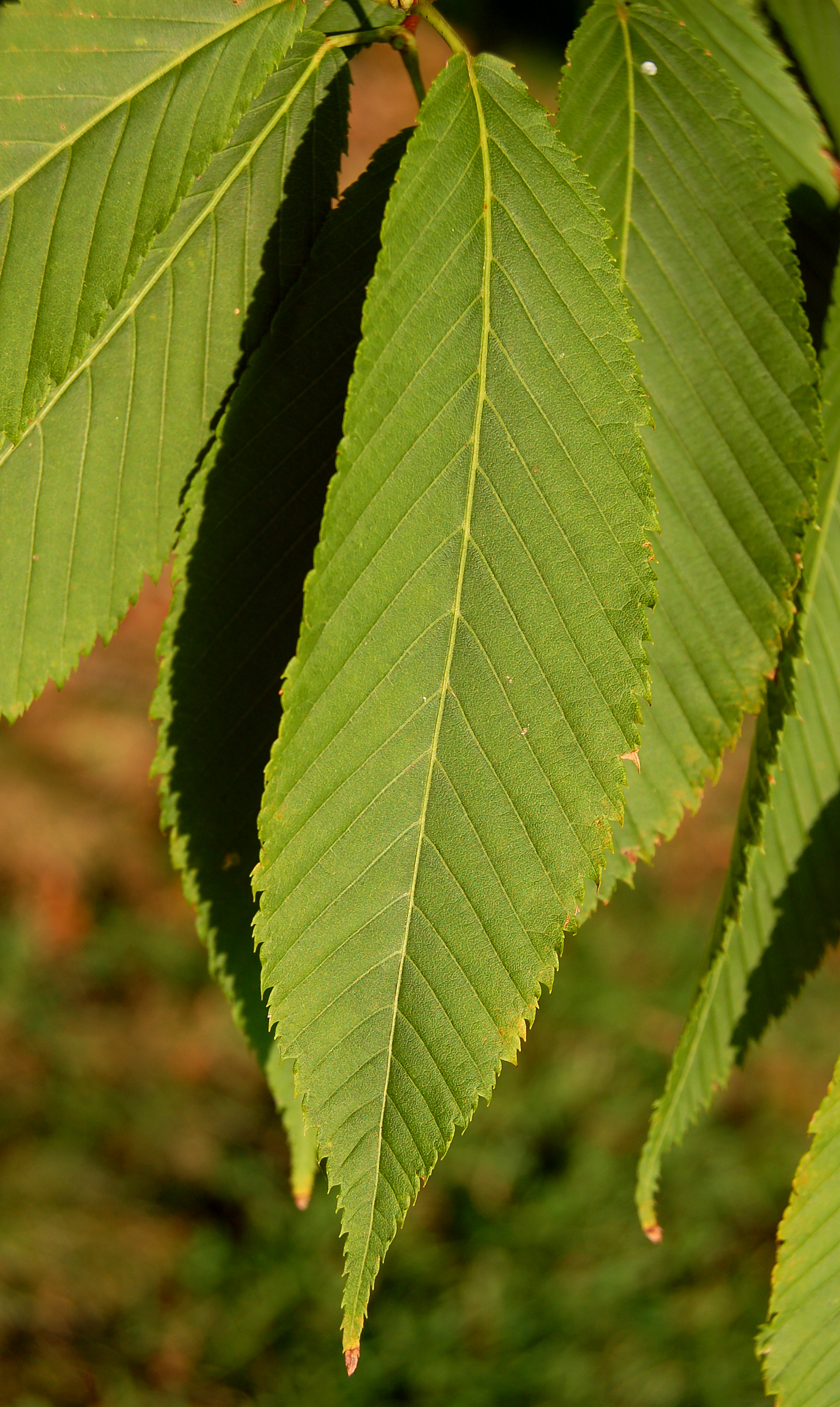
Leaves
