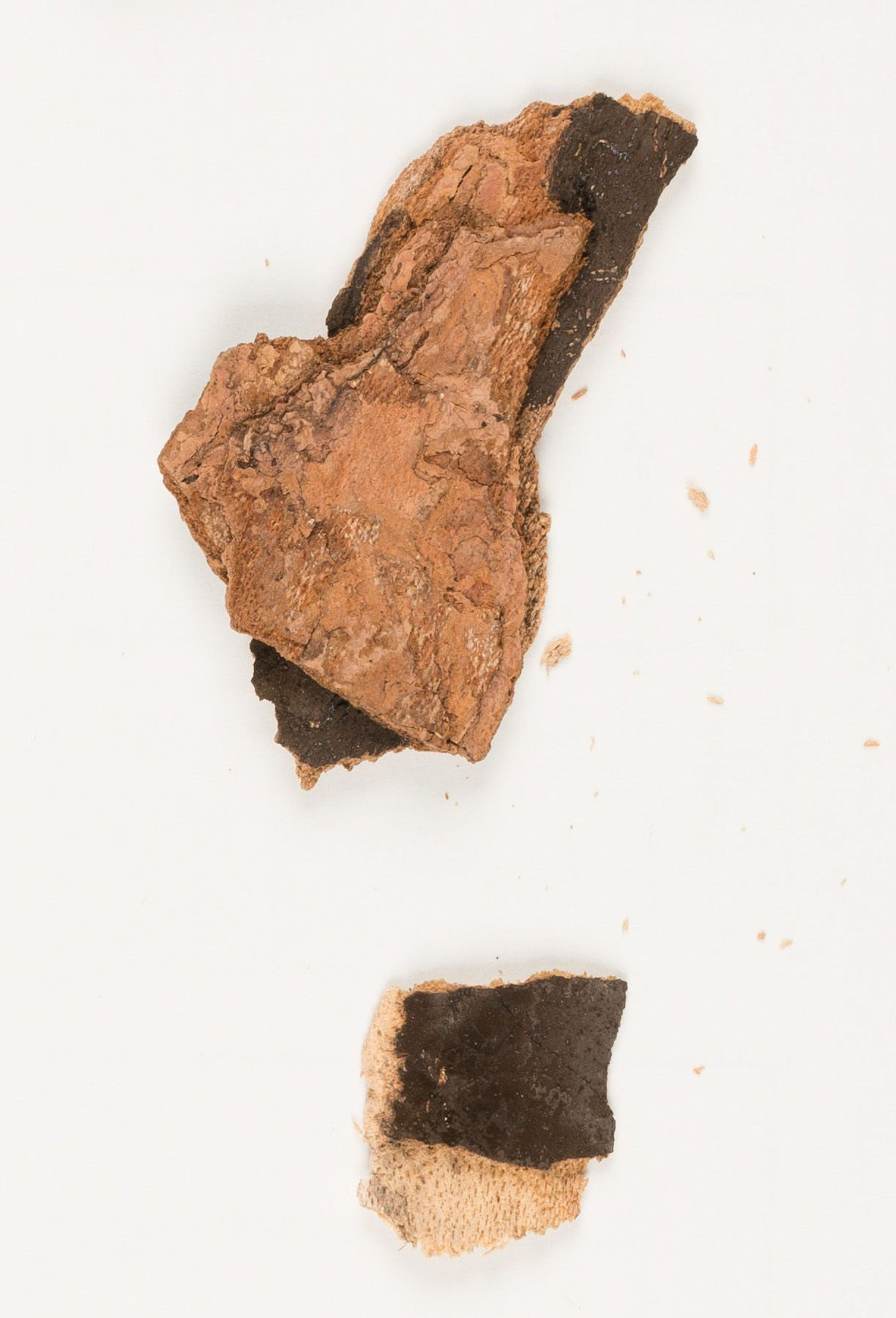
- Cryptostroma corticale

Scientific classification
- Kingdom: Fungi
- Division: Ascomycota
- Class: Sordariomycetes
- Order: Xylariales
- Genus: Cryptostroma; P.H. Greg. & S. Waller
- Species: C. corticale

Binomial name
- Cryptostroma corticale (Ellis & Everh.) P.H. Greg. & S. Waller

Synonyms
- Coniosporium corticale Ellis & Everh. (1889)

= Cryptostroma =

Species of fungus

Cryptostroma corticale is a species of fungus that causes sooty bark disease of maples, particularly sycamore (Acer pseudoplatanus). The spores grow profusely under the bark of affected trees or stacked logs. The fungus causes disease and death in trees, and the spores are allergenic and cause a debilitating pneumonitis (inflammation of the lungs) in humans. It is the only species in the genus Cryptostroma.

== Taxonomy ==
The fungus is thought to have originated in North America and was originally named Coniosporium corticale by the American mycologists Job Bicknell Ellis and Benjamin Matlack Everhart. The characteristics of the stroma, conidiophores and conidia was the basis for placing it in a new genus as Cryptostroma corticale. It is the type species.

== Biology ==
Sooty bark disease causes wilting of the crown and dieback of branches. Rectangular patches of bark, and later long strips of bark, become detached from the trunk exposing thick layers of black fungal spores. It has been found that the fungus spreads more rapidly through the tree's tissues at 25 °C (77 °F) than at 15 °C (59 °F), and in the former instance, more rapidly when the tree is under greater water stress. This would seem to suggest that the disease is associated with raised summer temperatures.

== Allergenic activity ==
Maple bark disease, or maple bark stripper's disease, is an uncommon condition caused by exposure to the spores of C. corticale. The spores are hyper-allergenic and cause a hypersensitivity pneumonitis. The disease has been found among workers in the paper industry employed to debark, cut and chip maple logs. The symptoms include breathlessness, fever, night sweats, chills and weight loss.
