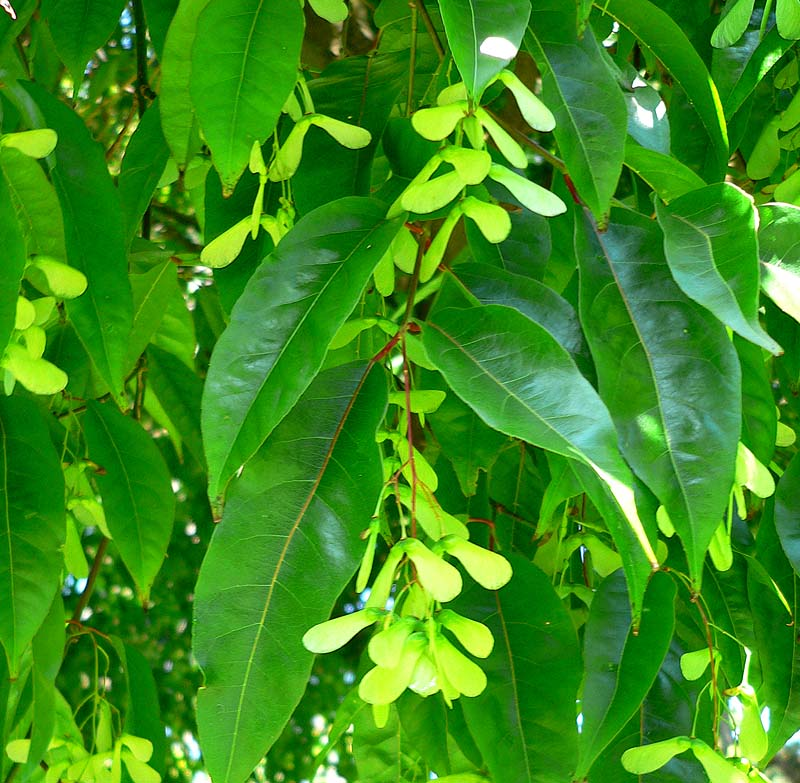

Conservation status
- Least Concern (IUCN 3.1)

Scientific classification
- Kingdom: Plantae
- Clade: Tracheophytes
- Clade: Angiosperms
- Clade: Eudicots
- Clade: Rosids
- Order: Sapindales
- Family: Sapindaceae
- Genus: Acer
- Section: Acer sect. Palmata
- Series: Acer ser. Penninervia
- Species: A. laevigatum

Binomial name
- Acer laevigatum Wall. 1830 not G. Nicholson 1881

= Acer laevigatum =

Species of maple

Acer laevigatum, the smooth maple or Nepal maple, is an atypical species of maple native to southern China (Guizhou, Hong Kong, Hubei, Shanxi, Sichuan, Tibet, Yunnan), northern India (Arunachal Pradesh, Sikkim), northern Myanmar, Nepal, and northern Vietnam. It grows at moderate altitudes of 1,000-2,000 m, with a wet monsoon climate.

Acer laevigatum is an evergreen tree growing to a height of 10–15 m or more, with a trunk up to 50 cm diameter. The leaves are smooth, unlobed, leathery, olive-green, and about 6–15 cm long and 3–5 cm wide, with a short 1-1.5 cm petiole. The leaves are normally persistent, and only drop in winter in unusually severe frost.

The samaras are 4–7 cm long and have a purplish tone.

There are two varieties, which may not be fully distinct:

- Acer laevigatum var. laevigatum Most of the species' range. Leaves glabrous (hairless).
- Acer laevigatum var. salweenense (W.W.Smith) J.M.Cowan ex W.P.Fang - Yunnan. Leaves pubescent (downy).

== Cultivation ==
This tree is only rarely seen in maple collections as it is too tender for many locations, with successful cultivation north to Ireland in Europe, and southwest British Columbia in North America. One in Cornwall is 17 m tall (Tree Register of the British Isles).
