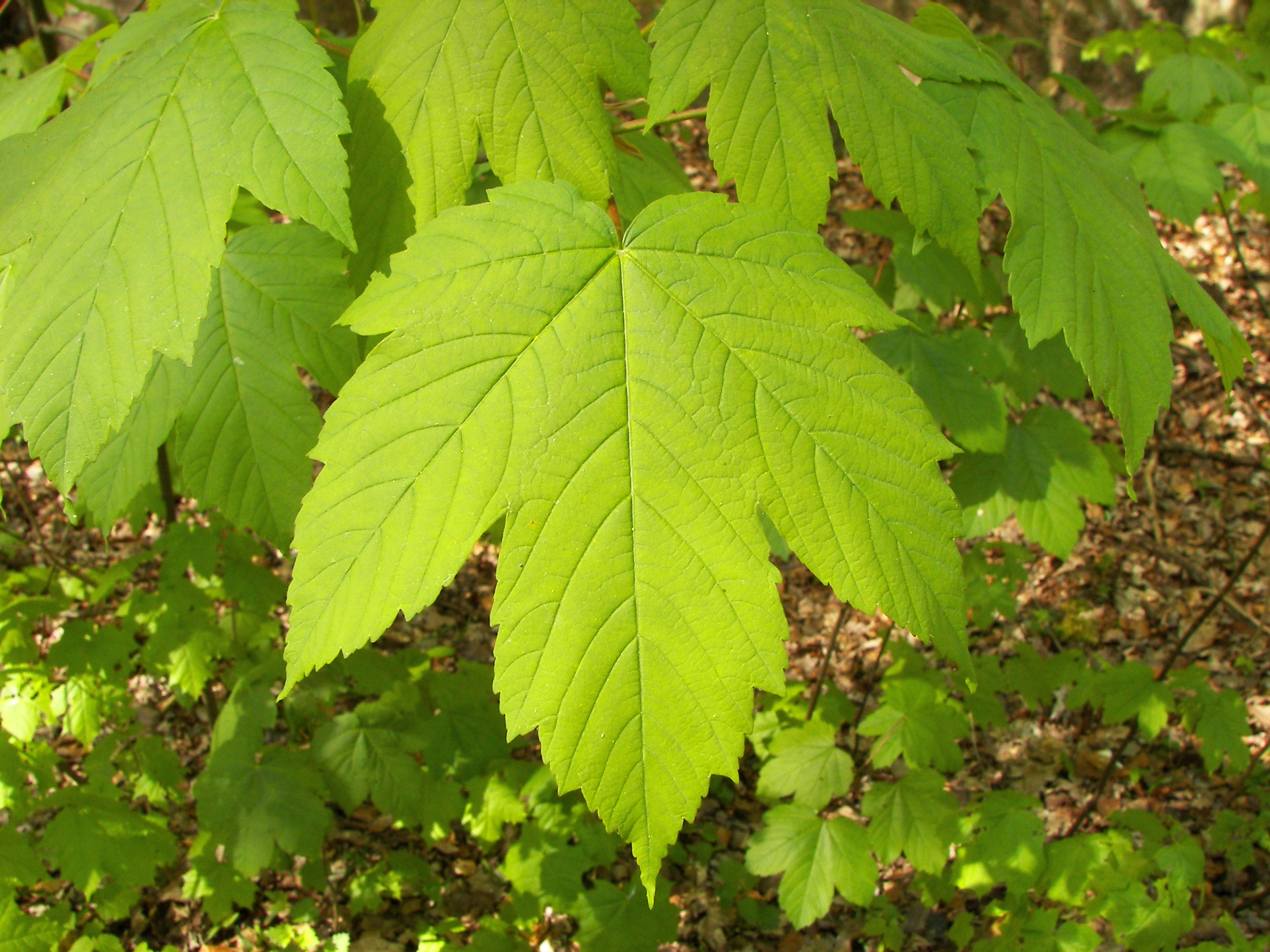
- Spring foliage of Acer pseudoplatanus, the sycamore maple

Scientific classification
- Kingdom: Plantae
- Clade: Tracheophytes
- Clade: Angiosperms
- Clade: Eudicots
- Clade: Rosids
- Order: Sapindales
- Family: Sapindaceae
- Subfamily: Hippocastanoideae
- Tribe: Acereae
- Genus: Acer; L.

Species
- See either species grouped by sections alphabetical list of species
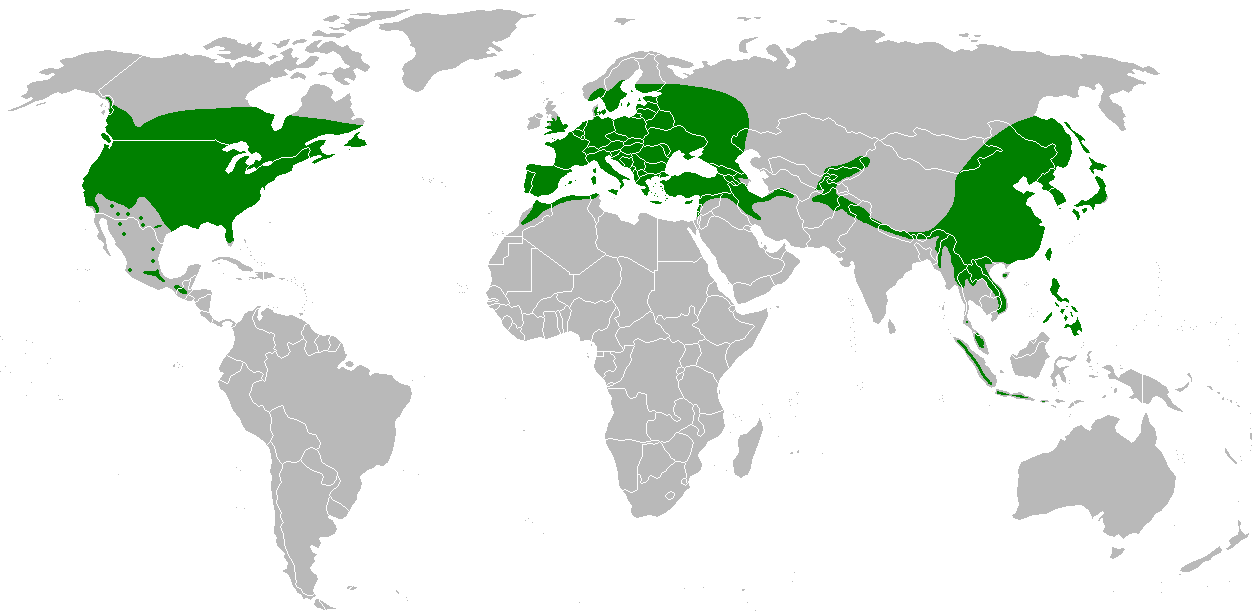
- range of genus

= Maple =

Maple Temporal range: Late Paleocene – Recent

Genus of flowering plants

Acer is a genus of trees and shrubs commonly known as maples. The genus is placed in the soapberry family Sapindaceae. There are approximately 132 species, most of which are native to East Asia, with a number also appearing in Europe, northern Africa, and North America. Only one species, Acer laurinum, extends to the Southern Hemisphere. The type species of the genus is the sycamore maple Acer pseudoplatanus, one of the most common maple species in Europe. Most maples have easily identifiable palmate leaves (with a few exceptions, such as Acer carpinifolium, Acer laurinum, and Acer negundo) and all share distinctive winged fruits. The closest relative of the maples is the small east Asian genus Dipteronia, followed by the more widespread genus Aesculus (buckeyes and horse-chestnuts). Maple syrup is made from the sap of some maple species. It is one of the most common genera of trees in Asia. Many maple species are grown in gardens where they are valued for their autumn colour and often decorative foliage, some also for their attractive flowers, fruit, or bark.

== Evolutionary history ==
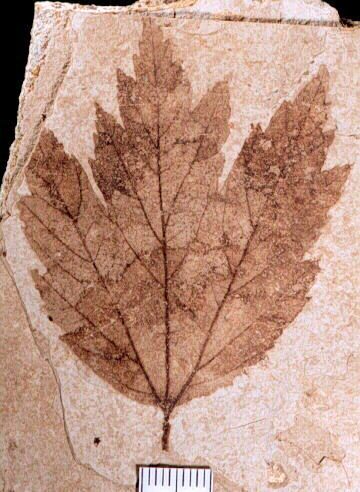
A leaf fossil of Acer florissanti from the Late Eocene in the Florissant Formation, Florissant, Colorado, United States

The closest relative of Acer is Dipteronia, which only has two living species in China, but has a fossil record extending back to the middle Paleocene in North America. The oldest known fossils of Acer are from the late Paleocene of Northeast Asia and northern North America, around 60 million years old. The oldest fossils of Acer in Europe are from Svalbard, dating to the late Eocene (Priabonian ~38–34 million years ago).

== Morphology ==
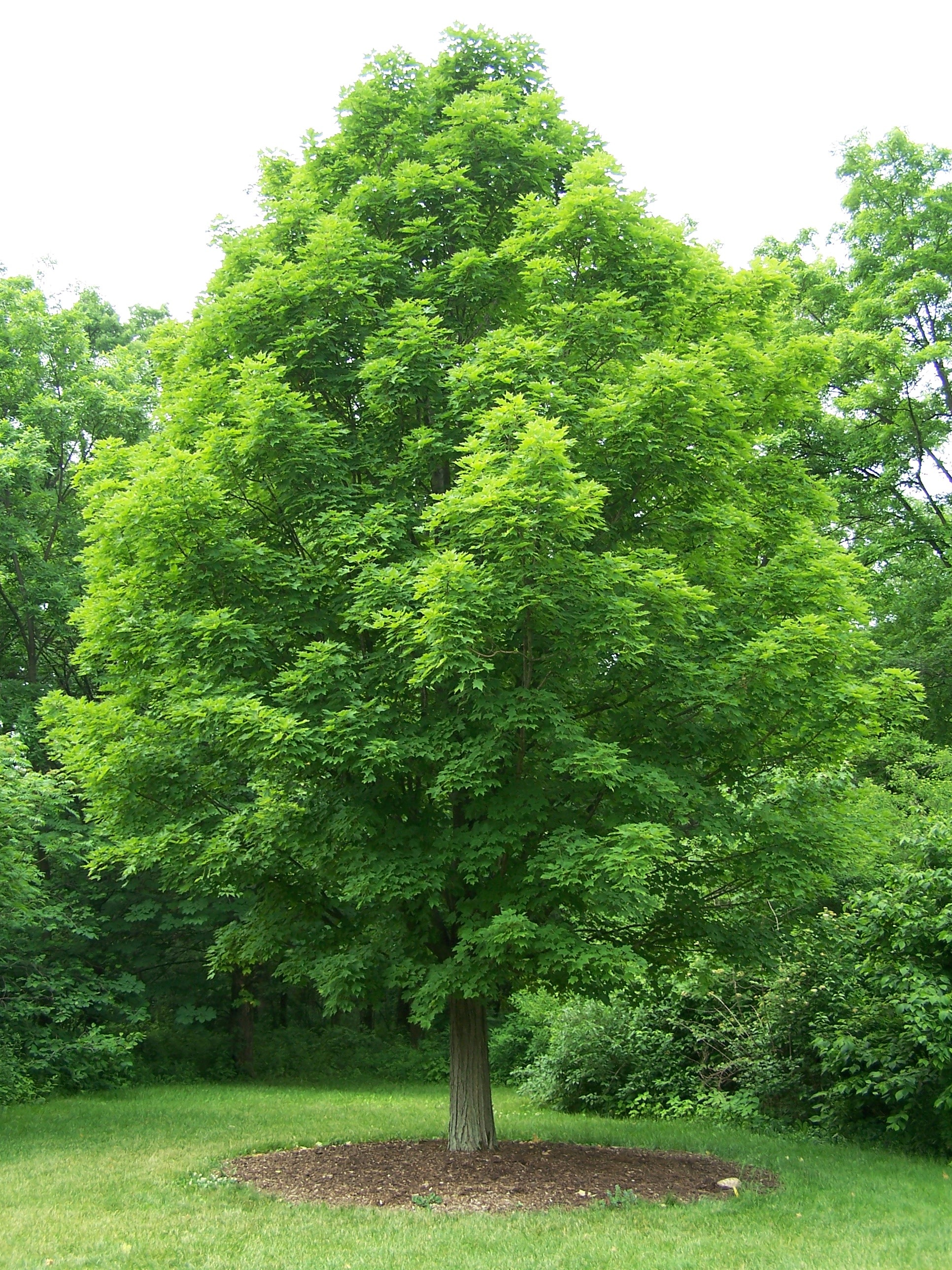
Acer saccharum (sugar maple)

Most maples or acers are trees growing to a height of 10–45 m (33–148 ft). Others are shrubs less than 10 meters tall with a number of small trunks originating at about ground level. Most species are deciduous, and many are renowned for their autumn leaf colours, but a few in southern Asia and the Mediterranean region are mostly evergreen. Most are shade-tolerant when young and are often riparian, understory, or pioneer species rather than climax overstory trees. There are a few exceptions such as sugar maple, which may form monodominant forests. Many of the root systems are typically dense and fibrous, inhibiting the growth of other vegetation underneath them. A few species, notably Acer cappadocicum, frequently produce root sprouts, which can develop into clonal colonies.

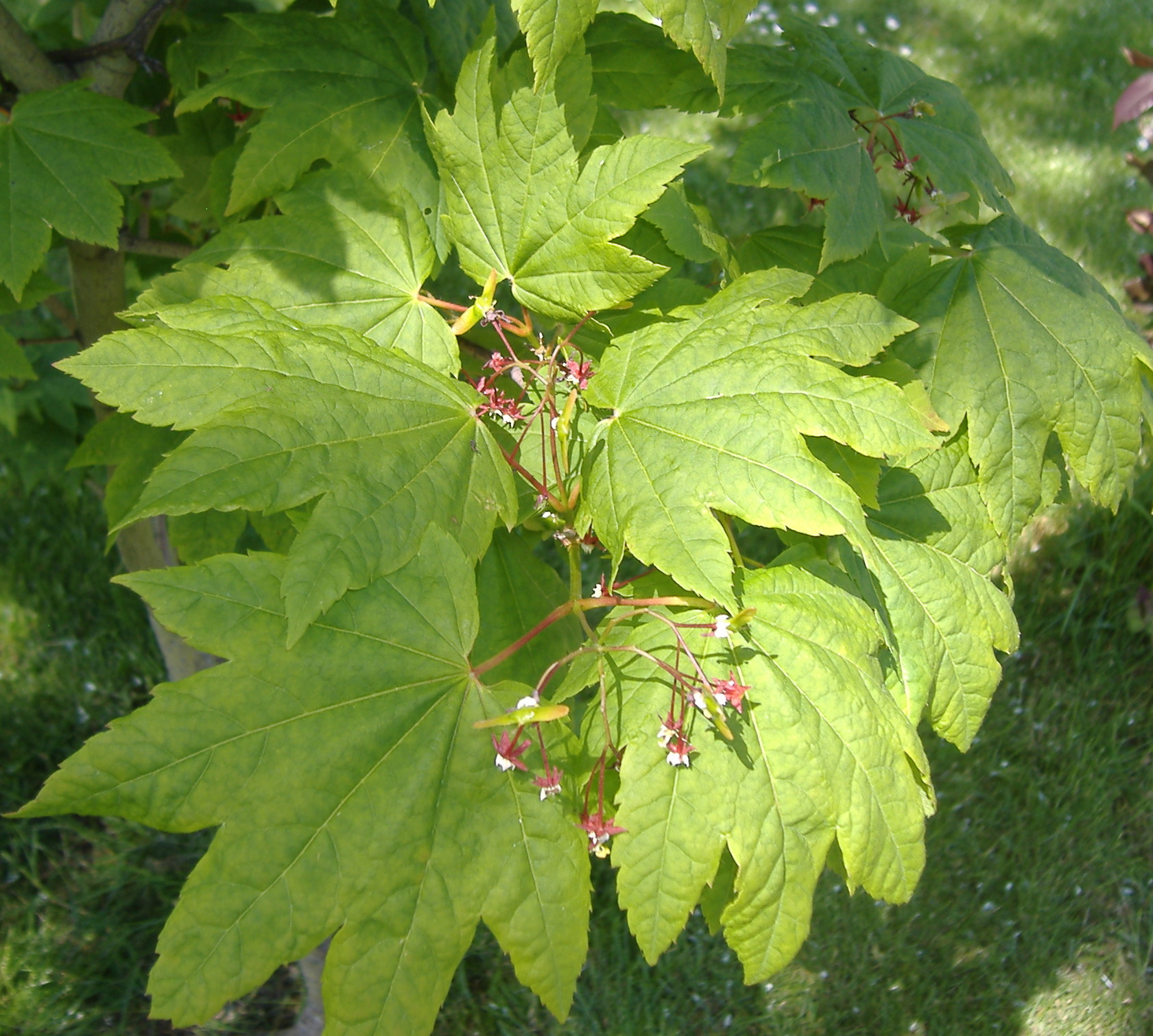
Acer circinatum (vine maple) leaves showing the palmate veining typical of most species

Maples are distinguished by opposite leaf arrangement. The leaves in most species are palmate veined and lobed, with 3 to 9 (rarely to 13) veins each leading to a lobe, one of which is central or apical. A small number of species differ in having palmate compound, pinnate compound, pinnate veined or unlobed leaves. Several species, including Acer griseum (paperbark maple), Acer mandshuricum (Manchurian maple), Acer maximowiczianum (Nikko maple) and Acer triflorum (three-flowered maple), have trifoliate leaves. One species, Acer negundo (box-elder or Manitoba maple), has pinnately compound leaves that may be simply trifoliate or may have five, seven, or rarely nine leaflets. A few, such as Acer laevigatum (Nepal maple) and Acer carpinifolium (hornbeam maple), have pinnately veined simple leaves.

Maple species, such as Acer rubrum, may be monoecious, dioecious or polygamodioecious. The flowers are regular, pentamerous, and borne in racemes, corymbs, or umbels. They have four or five sepals, four or five petals about 1–6 mm long (absent in some species), four to ten stamens about 6–10 mm long, and two pistils or a pistil with two styles. The ovary is superior and has two carpels, whose wings elongate the flowers, making it easy to tell which flowers are female. Maples flower in late winter or early spring, in most species with or just after the appearance of the leaves, but in some before the trees leaf out.

Maple flowers are green, yellow, orange or red. Though individually small, the effect of an entire tree in flower can be striking in several species. Some maples are an early spring source of pollen and nectar for bees.

3D rendering of a μCT scan of a samara. Resolution is about 45 μm/voxel.

The distinctive fruits are called samaras, "maple keys", "helicopters", "whirlybirds" or "polynoses". These seeds occur in distinctive pairs each containing one seed enclosed in a "nutlet" attached to a flattened wing of fibrous, papery tissue. They are shaped to spin as they fall and to carry the seeds a considerable distance on the wind. People often call them "helicopters" due to the way that they spin as they fall. During World War II, the US Army developed a special airdrop supply carrier that could carry up to 65 pounds (29 kg) of supplies and was based on the maple seed. Seed maturation is usually in a few weeks to six months after flowering, with seed dispersal shortly after maturity. However, one tree can release hundreds of thousands of seeds at a time. Depending on the species, the seeds can be small and green to orange and big with thicker seed pods. The green seeds are released in pairs, sometimes with the stems still connected. The yellow seeds are released individually and almost always without the stems. Most species require stratification in order to germinate, and some seeds can remain dormant in the soil for several years before germinating.

The genus Acer, together with genus Dipteronia, were formerly often classified in a family of their own, the Aceraceae, but recent botanical consensus, including the Angiosperm Phylogeny Group system, includes them in the family Sapindaceae; their exclusion from Sapindaceae would leave that family paraphyletic. Within Sapindaceae, Acer is placed in the subfamily Hippocastanoideae. The genus is subdivided by its morphology into a multitude of sections and subsections. Molecular studies incorporating DNA sequence data from both chloroplast and nuclear genomes, aiming to resolve the internal relationships and reconstruct the evolutionary history of the group, suggest a Late Paleocene origin for the group, appearing first in the northeastern Palearctic. Rapid lineage divergence was followed by several independent dispersals to the Nearctic and Western Palearctic regions. Fifty-four species of maples meet the International Union for Conservation of Nature criteria for being under threat of extinction in their native habitat.

== Pests and diseases ==
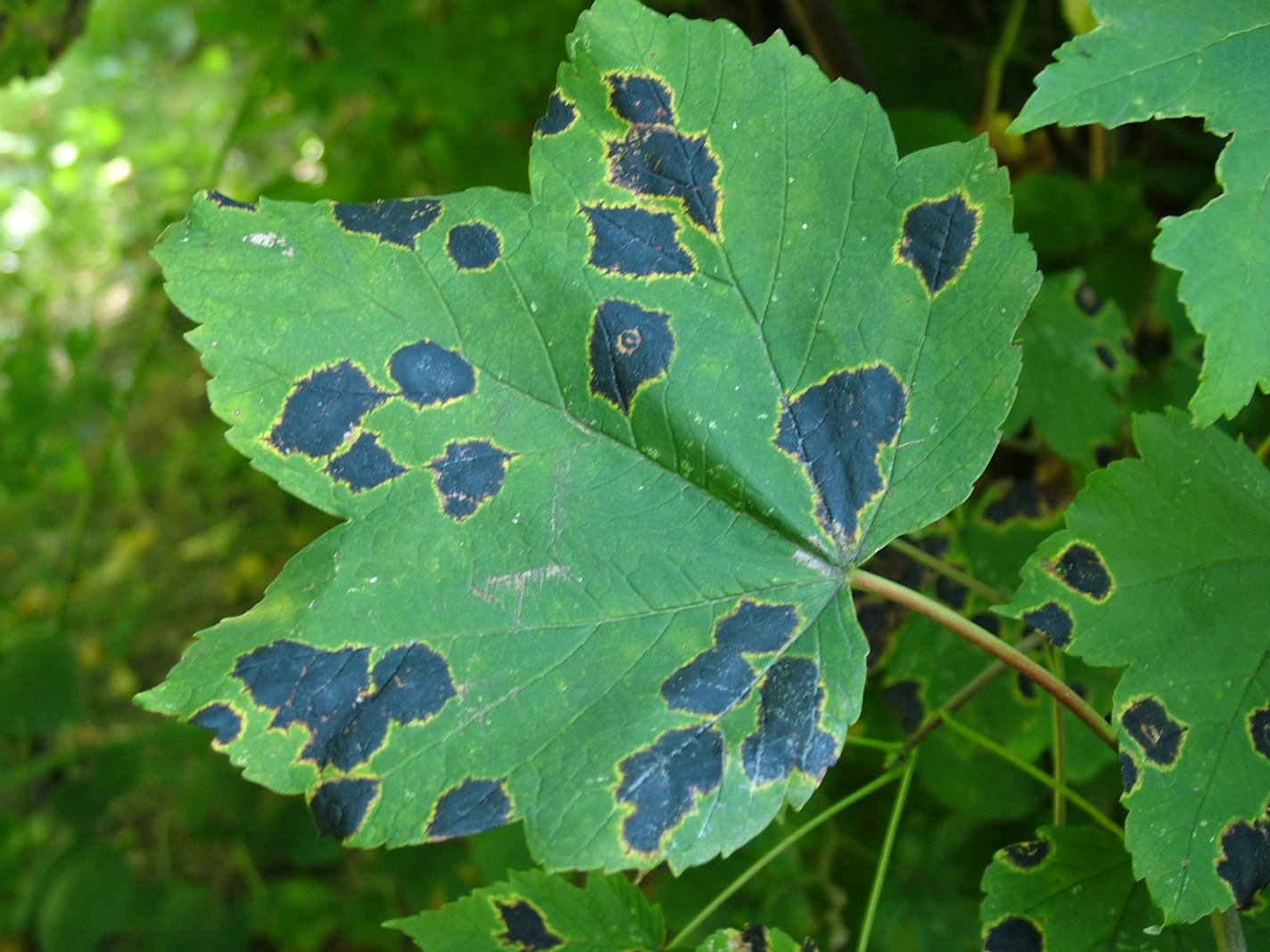
Rhytisma acerinum fungus on Acer pseudoplatanus leaf

The leaves are used as a food plant for the larvae of a number of the order Lepidoptera (see List of Lepidoptera that feed on maples). In high concentrations, caterpillars, like the greenstriped mapleworm (Dryocampa rubicunda), can feed on the leaves so much that they cause temporary defoliation of host maple trees. Aphids are also very common sap-feeders on maples, they are a natural part of herbivorous insect communities on maples, though they may become pests when accumulated in large densities. In horticultural applications a dimethoate spray will solve this.

Aphid abundance has been shown to depend on tree condition and host species.Different maple species support distinct insect communities, one study found that aphid populations were much more abundant on Sycamore maple and lower on Norway maple.Variations in tree health and pest populations are also closely linked as both are influenced by environmental conditions; factors such as urban stress, drought, soil conditions, and pollution can affect tree vitality and alter insect abundance.This relationship is consistent with the plant stress hypothesis which proposes that environmental stress can modify plant defences and, in some cases, increase susceptibility to herbivorous insects.

Infestations of the Asian long-horned beetle (Anoplophora glabripennis) have resulted in the destruction of thousands of maples and other tree species in Illinois, Massachusetts, New Jersey, New York, and Ohio in the United States and Ontario, Canada.

Maples are affected by a number of fungal diseases. Several are susceptible to Verticillium wilt caused by Verticillium species, which can cause significant local mortality. Sooty bark disease, caused by Cryptostroma species, can kill trees that are under stress due to drought. Death of maples can rarely be caused by Phytophthora root rot and Ganoderma root decay. Maple leaves in late summer and autumn are commonly disfigured by "tar spot" caused by Rhytisma species and mildew caused by Uncinula species, though these diseases do not usually have an adverse effect on the trees' long-term health.

== Cultural significance ==
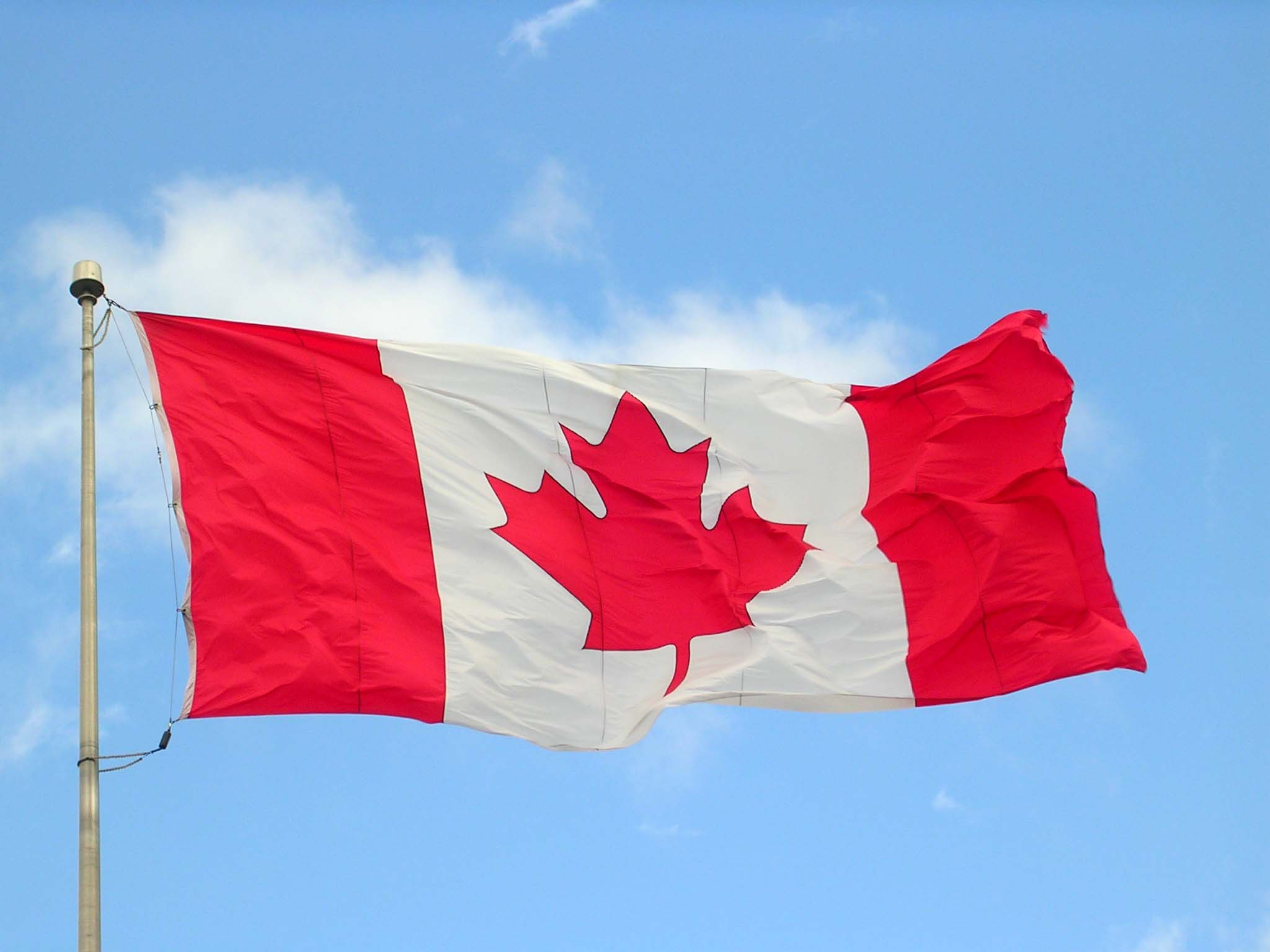
The Canadian flag incorporates a stylized maple leaf

The maple leaf and samaras in the coat of arms of Sammatti

A maple leaf appears on the coat of arms of Canada, and is on the Canadian flag. The maple is a common symbol of strength and endurance and has been chosen as the national tree of Canada. Maple leaves are traditionally an important part of Canadian Forces military regalia, for example, the military rank insignia for generals use maple leaf symbols. There are 10 species naturally growing in the country, with at least one in each province. Although the idea of the tree as a national symbol originally hailed from the province of Quebec where the sugar maple is significant, today's arboreal emblem of Canada rather refers to a generic maple. The design on the flag is an eleven-point stylization modeled after a sugar maple leaf (which normally bears 23 points).

It is also in the name of a Canadian ice hockey team, the Toronto Maple Leafs.

The first attested use of the word was in 1260 as "mapole", and it also appears a century later in Geoffrey Chaucer's Canterbury Tales, spelled as "mapul". The maple is also a symbol of Hiroshima, ubiquitous in the local meibutsu.

A maple leaf, along with samaras, appears in the coat of arms of Sammatti, a former municipality of Uusimaa, Finland.

== Uses ==
=== Horticulture ===
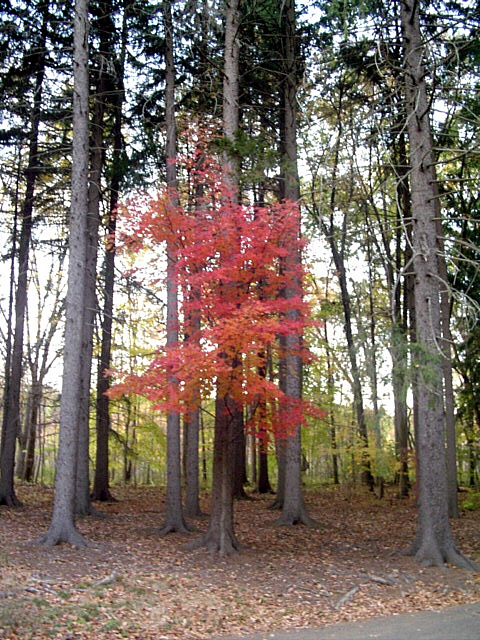
A red maple tree highlighted between spruce trees

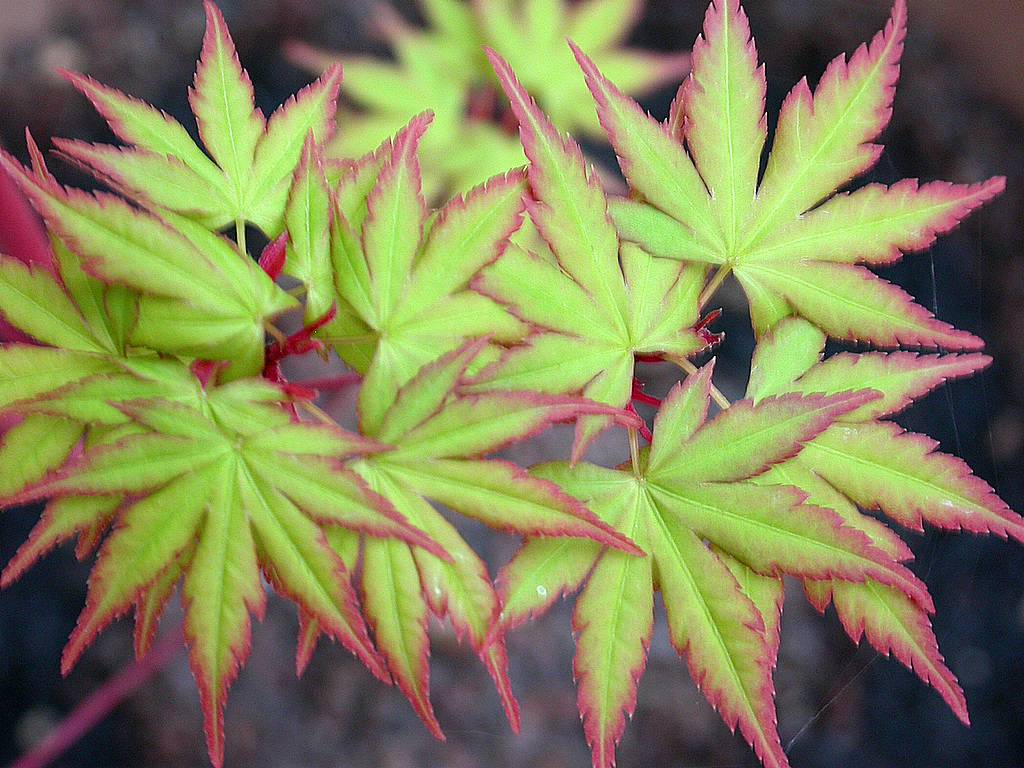
Acer palmatum (Japanese maple) has over 1,000 cultivars. This cultivar is A. palmatum 'Sango kaku', sometimes called "coralbark maple"

Some species of maple are extensively planted as ornamental trees by homeowners, businesses, and municipalities due to their fall colour, relatively fast growth, ease of transplanting, and lack of hard seeds that would pose a problem for mowing lawns. Particularly popular are Norway maple (although it is considered invasive in North America), silver maple, Japanese maple, and red maple. The vine maple is also occasionally used as an ornamental tree. Other maples, especially smaller or more unusual species, are popular as specimen trees.

==== Cultivars ====
Numerous maple cultivars that have been selected for particular characteristics can be propagated only by asexual reproduction such as cuttings, tissue culture, budding or grafting. Acer palmatum (Japanese maple) alone has over 1,000 cultivars, most selected in Japan, and many of them no longer propagated or not in cultivation in the Western world. Some delicate cultivars are usually grown in pots and rarely reach heights of more than 50–100 cm.

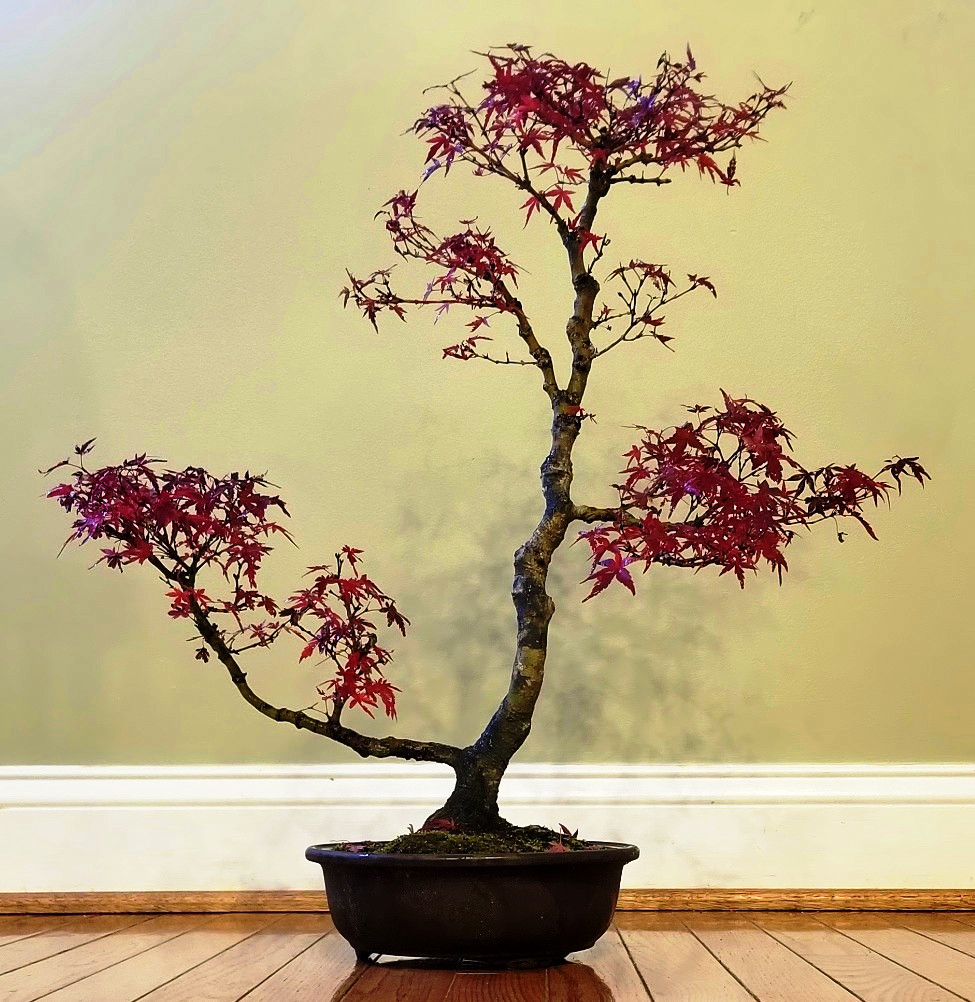
Acer palmatum var. 'Kiyohime' as bonsai during fall abscission. This dwarf hybrid cultivar is prized for its small leaves and bright red fall colors.

==== Bonsai ====
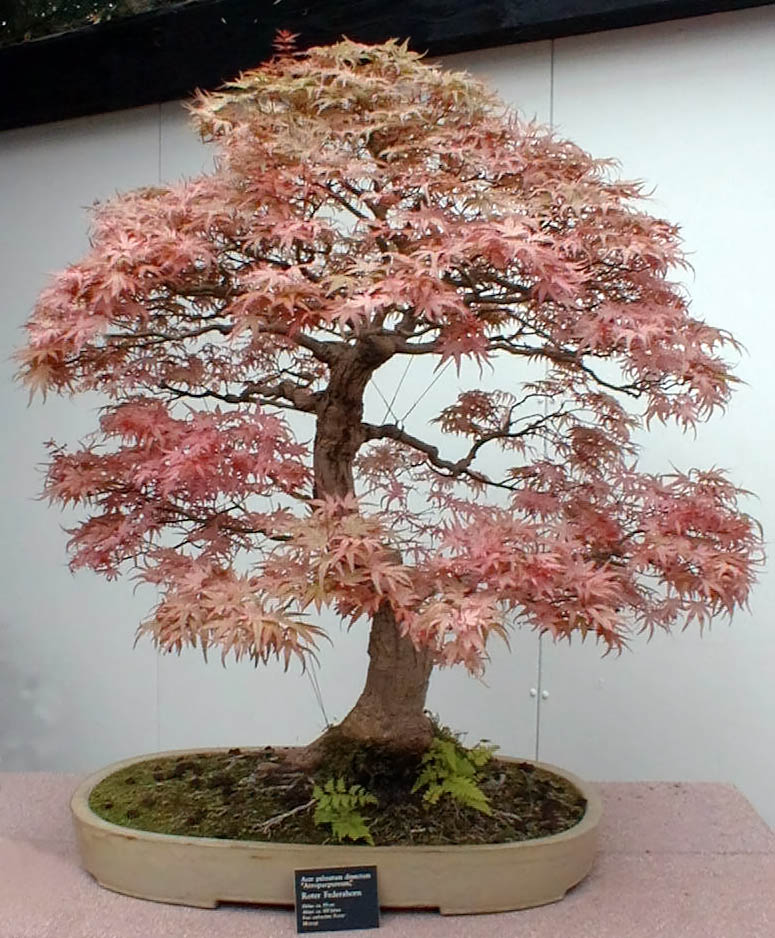
"Roter Fächerahorn"

Maples are a popular choice for the art of bonsai. Japanese maple (Acer palmatum), trident maple (A. buergerianum), Amur maple (A. ginnala), field maple (A. campestre) and Montpellier maple (A. monspessulanum) are popular choices and respond well to techniques that encourage leaf reduction and ramification, but most species can be used.

==== Collections ====
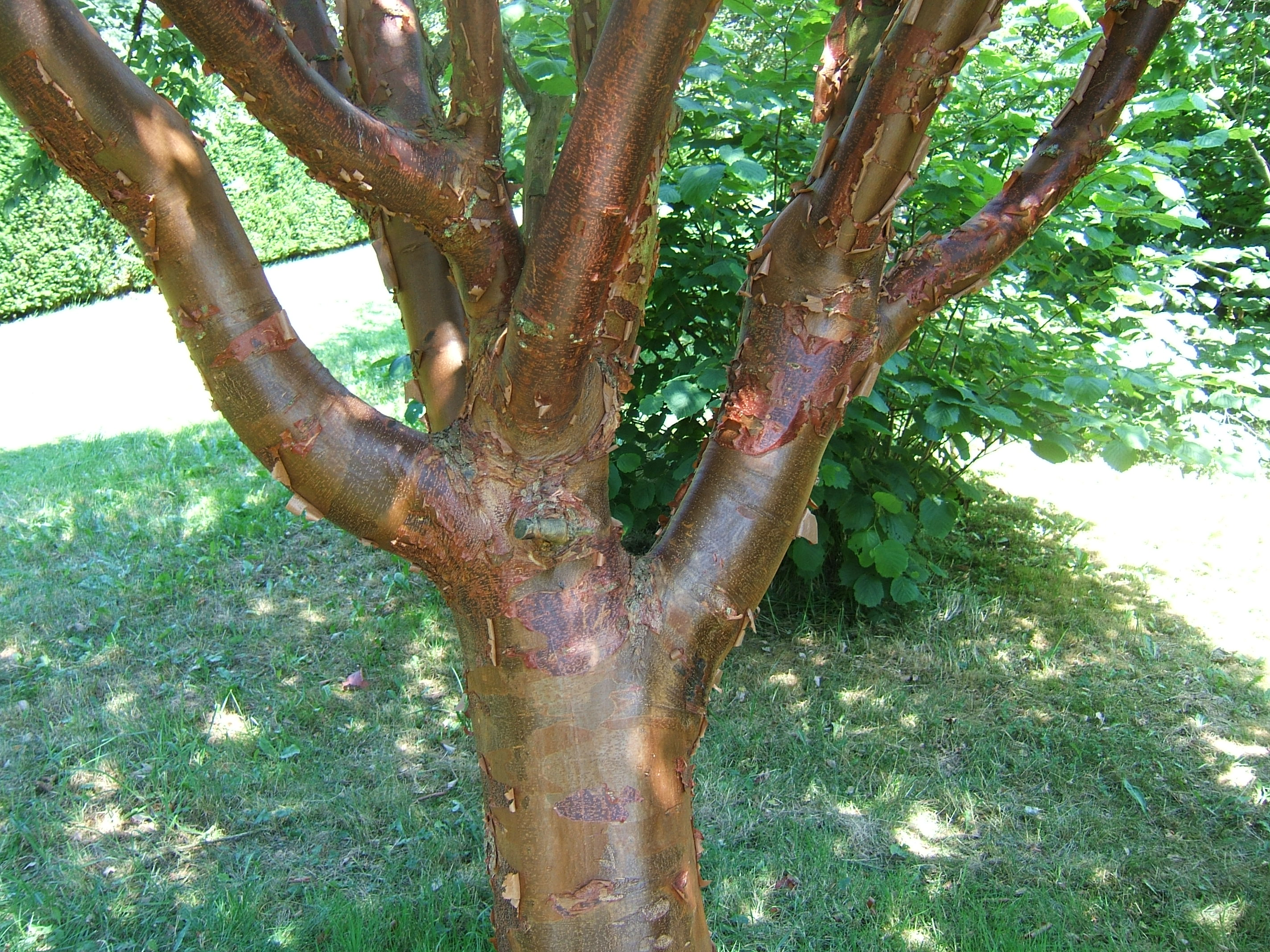
Acer griseum is widely grown for its decorative bark

Maple collections, sometimes called aceretums, occupy space in many gardens and arboreta around the world including the "five great W's" in England: Wakehurst Place Garden, Westonbirt Arboretum, Windsor Great Park, Winkworth Arboretum and Wisley Garden. In the United States, the aceretum at the Harvard-owned Arnold Arboretum in Boston is especially notable. In the number of species and cultivars, the Esveld Aceretum in Boskoop, Netherlands, is the largest in the world.

=== Commercial uses ===
Maples are important as sources of syrup and wood. Dried wood is often used for the smoking of food. Charcoal from maples is an integral part of the Lincoln County Process used to make Tennessee whiskey. They are also cultivated as ornamental plants and have benefits for tourism and agriculture.

==== Timber ====
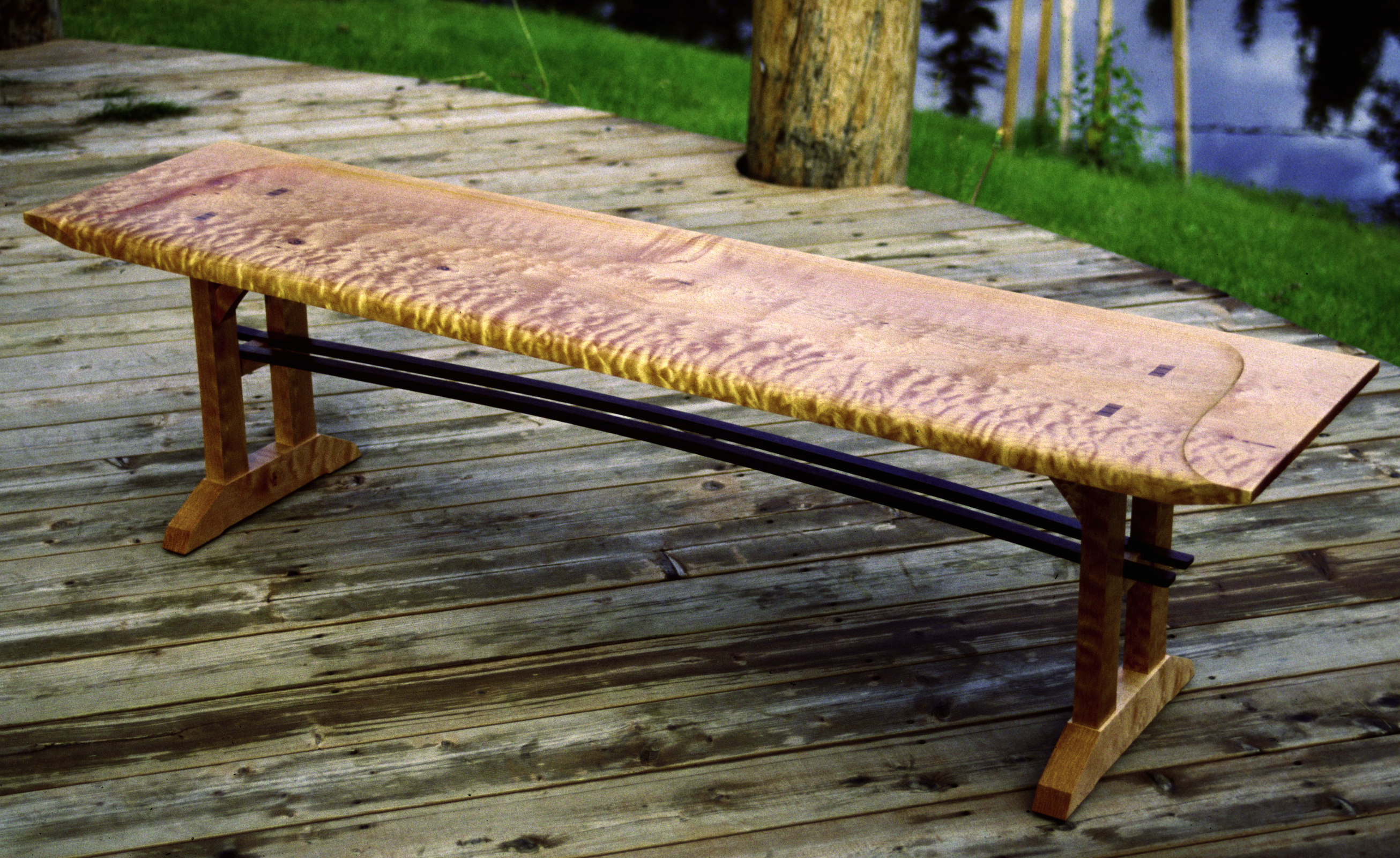
A bench made of highly figured maple wood

Some of the larger maple species have valuable timber, particularly Sugar maple in North America and Sycamore maple in Europe. Sugar maple wood—often known as "hard maple"—is the wood of choice for bowling pins, bowling alley lanes, pool and snooker cue shafts, and butcher's blocks. Maple wood is also used for the manufacture of wooden baseball bats, though less often than ash or hickory due to the tendency of maple bats to shatter if they do break. The maple bat was introduced to Major League Baseball (MLB) in 1998 by Sam Bat founder Sam Holman. Today it is the standard maple bat most in use by professional baseball. Maple is also commonly used in archery as the core material in the limbs of a recurve bow due to its stiffness and strength.

Maple wood is often graded based on physical and aesthetic characteristics. The most common terminology includes the grading scale from common #2; which is unselected and often used for craft woods; common #1, used for commercial and residential buildings; clear; and select grade, which is sought for fine woodworking.

Some maple wood has a highly decorative wood grain, variously known as flame maple, quilt maple, birdseye maple and burl wood. This condition occurs randomly in individual trees of several species and often cannot be detected until the wood has been sawn, though it is sometimes visible in the standing tree as a rippled pattern in the bark.

These select decorative wood pieces also have subcategories that further filter the aesthetic looks. Crotch wood, bees wing, cats paw, old growth and mottled are some terms used to describe the look of these decorative woods.

Maples have a long history of use for furniture production in the United States. The Cherokee people would produce a purple dye from maple bark, which they used to dye cloth.

==== Tonewood ====
Maple is considered a tonewood, or a wood that carries sound waves well, and is used in numerous musical instruments. Maple is harder and has a brighter sound than mahogany, which is another major tonewood used in instrument manufacturing.

The back, sides, and neck of most violins, violas, cellos, and double basses are made from maple.

Electric guitar necks are commonly made from maple, having good dimensional stability. The necks of the Fender Stratocaster and Telecaster were originally an entirely maple one piece neck, but later were also available with rosewood fingerboards. Les Paul desired an all maple guitar, but due to the weight of maple, only the tops of Gibson's Les Paul guitars are made from carved maple, often using quilted or flamed maple tops. Due to its weight, very few solid body guitars are made entirely from maple, but many guitars have maple necks, tops or veneers.

Maple is also often used to make bassoons and sometimes other woodwind instruments such as recorders.

Many drums are made from maple. From the 1970s to the 1990s, maple drum kits were a vast majority of all drum kits made, but in recent years, birch has become popular for drums once again. Some of the best drum-building companies use maple extensively throughout their mid-pro range. Maple drums are favored for their bright resonant sound. Certain drum sticks are also made from maple.

==== Agriculture ====
During late winter to early spring in northeastern North America, when the night-to-day temperatures change from freezing to thawing, maple trees may be tapped for sap to manufacture maple syrup. The sap is sent via tubing to a sugar house where it is boiled to produce syrup or made into maple sugar or maple taffy. It takes about 40 litres (42 US qt) of sugar maple sap to make 1 litre (1.1 US qt) of syrup. While any Acer species may be tapped for syrup, many do not have sufficient quantities of sugar to be commercially useful, whereas sugar maples (A. saccharum) are most commonly used to produce maple syrup. Quebec is a major producer of maple syrup, an industry worth about 500 million Canadian dollars annually.

Also, as these trees are a major source of pollen in early spring before many other plants have flowered, maple flowers are a source of foraging for honeybees that play a commercially important role in general agriculture and in natural habitats.

==== Pulpwood ====
Maple is used as pulpwood. The fibers have relatively thick walls that prevent collapsing upon drying. This gives good bulk and opacity in paper. With a lignin content of approximately 21%, maple is often processed into high yield pulp to enhance printing properties.

=== Tourism ===
Many maples have bright autumn foliage, and many countries have leaf-watching traditions. The sugar maple (Acer saccharum), whose leaves turn brilliant orange, is the primary contributor to fall "foliage season" in north-eastern North America. In Japan, the custom of viewing the changing colour of maples in the autumn is called momijigari. Nikkō and Kyoto are particularly favoured destinations for this activity. In Korea, the same viewing activity is called danpung-nori and the Seoraksan and Naejang-san mountains are among the best-known destinations. These are examples of ecosystem services are examples of cultural ecosystem services that hold relational value.

=== Gallery ===
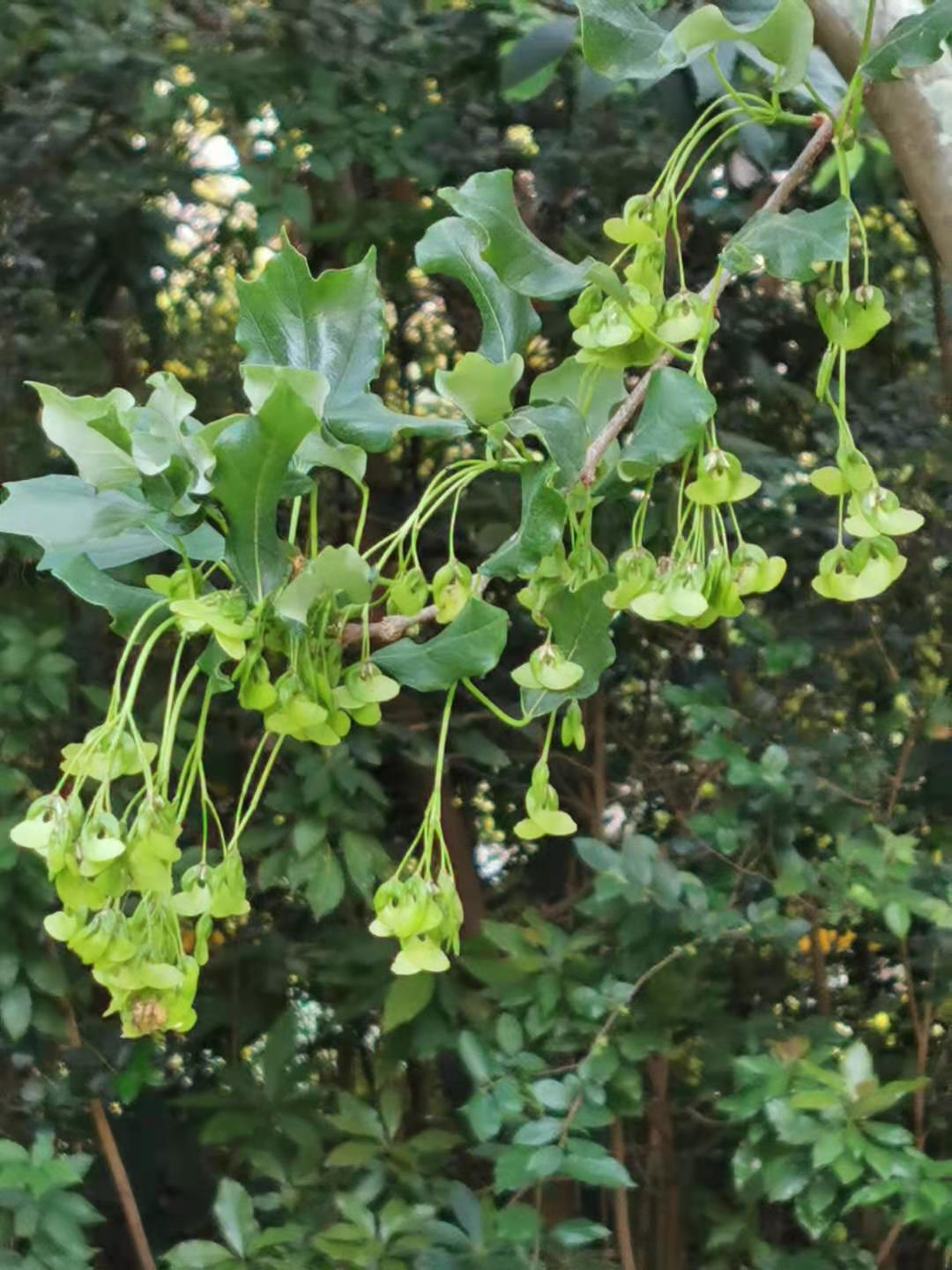
Acer buergerianum var. formosanum leaves and fruit

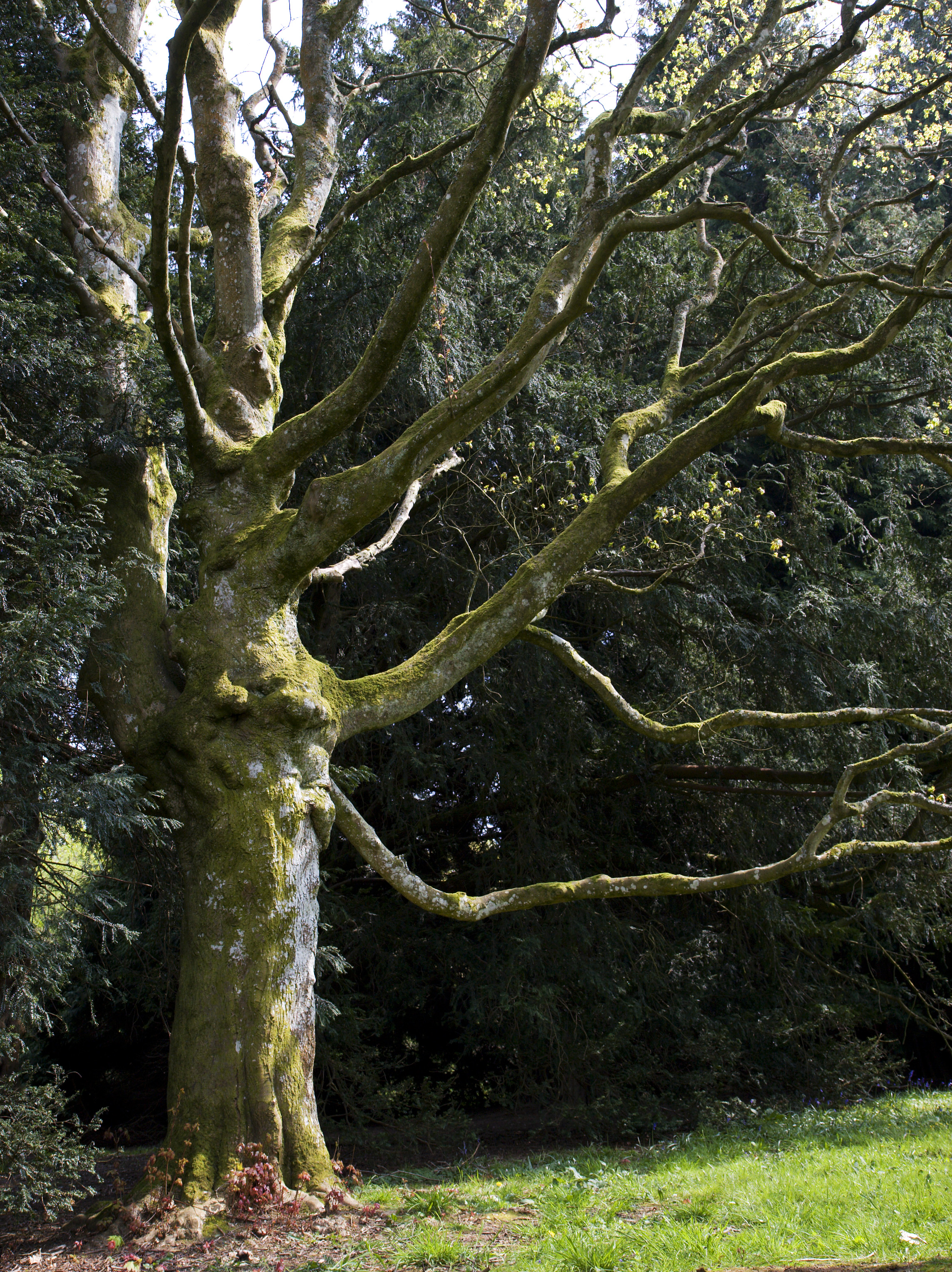
Acer cappadocicum (Cappadocian maple)

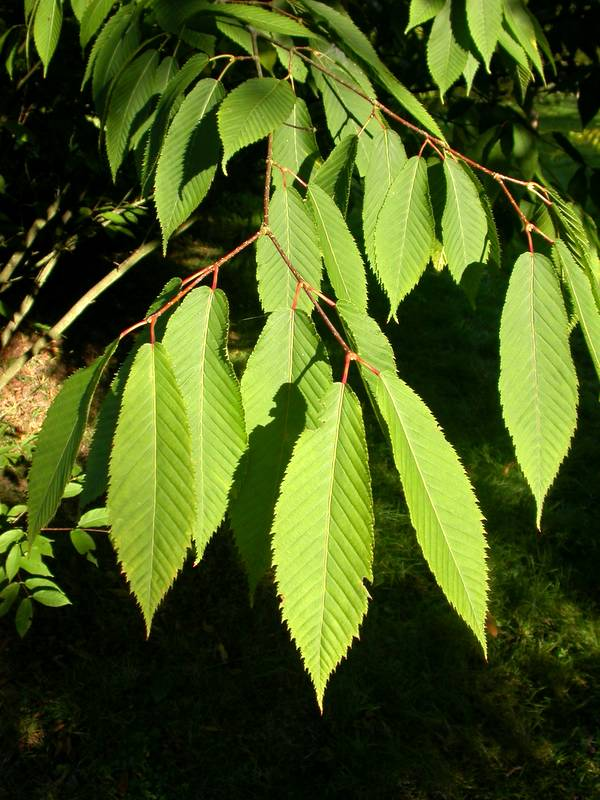
Acer carpinifolium leaves

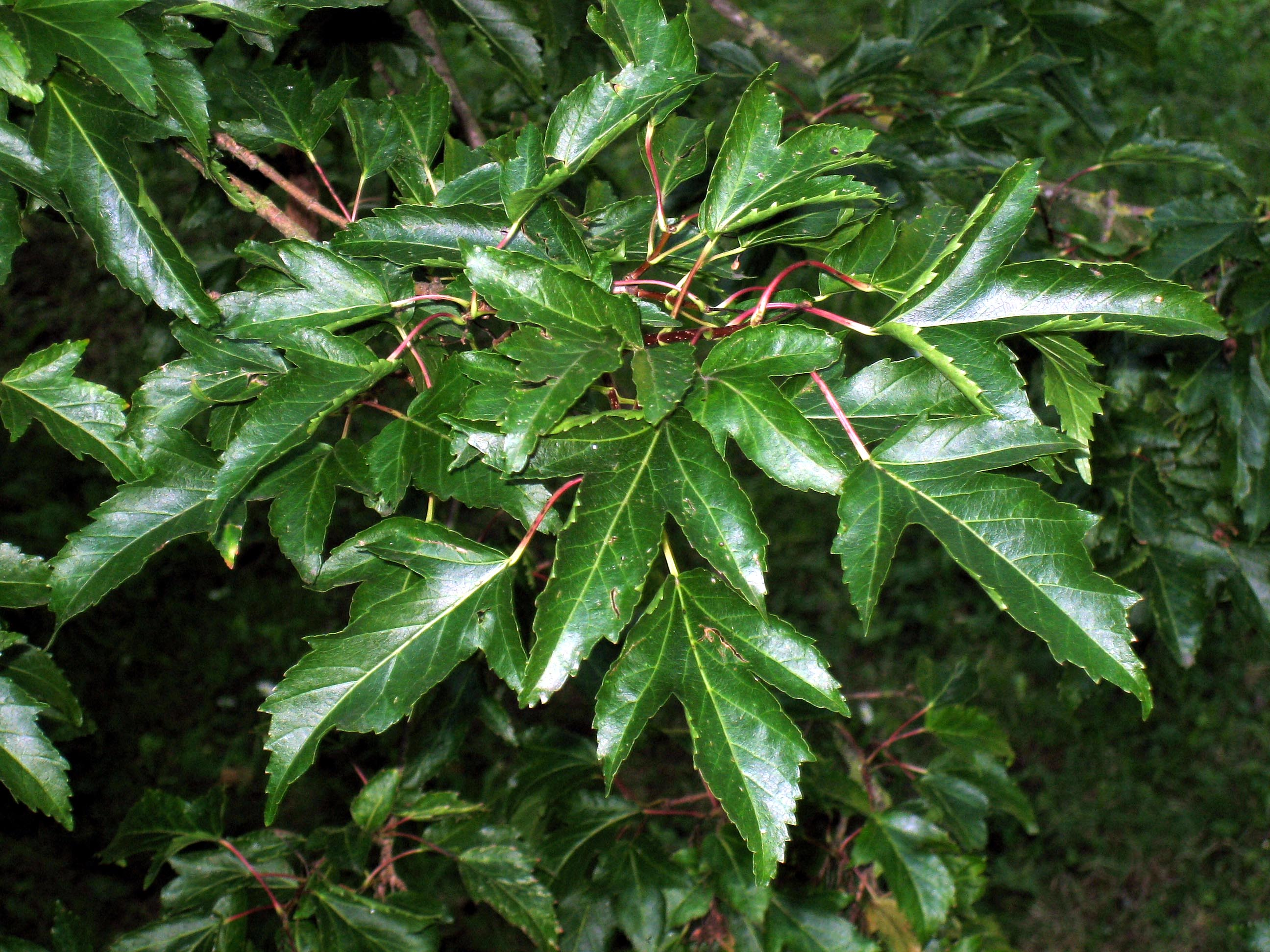
Acer ginnala foliage

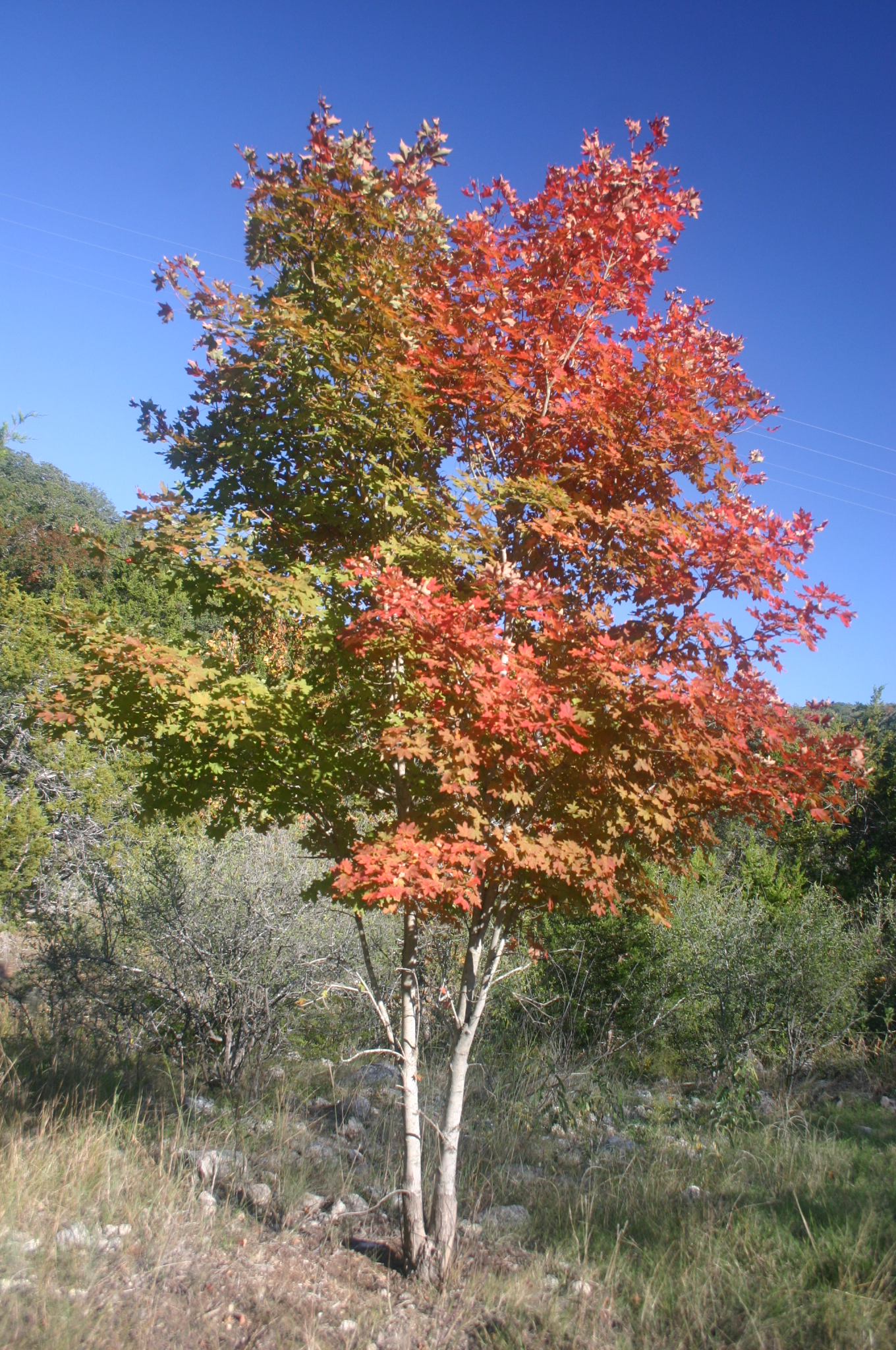
Acer grandidentatum (bigtooth maple) in autumn colour

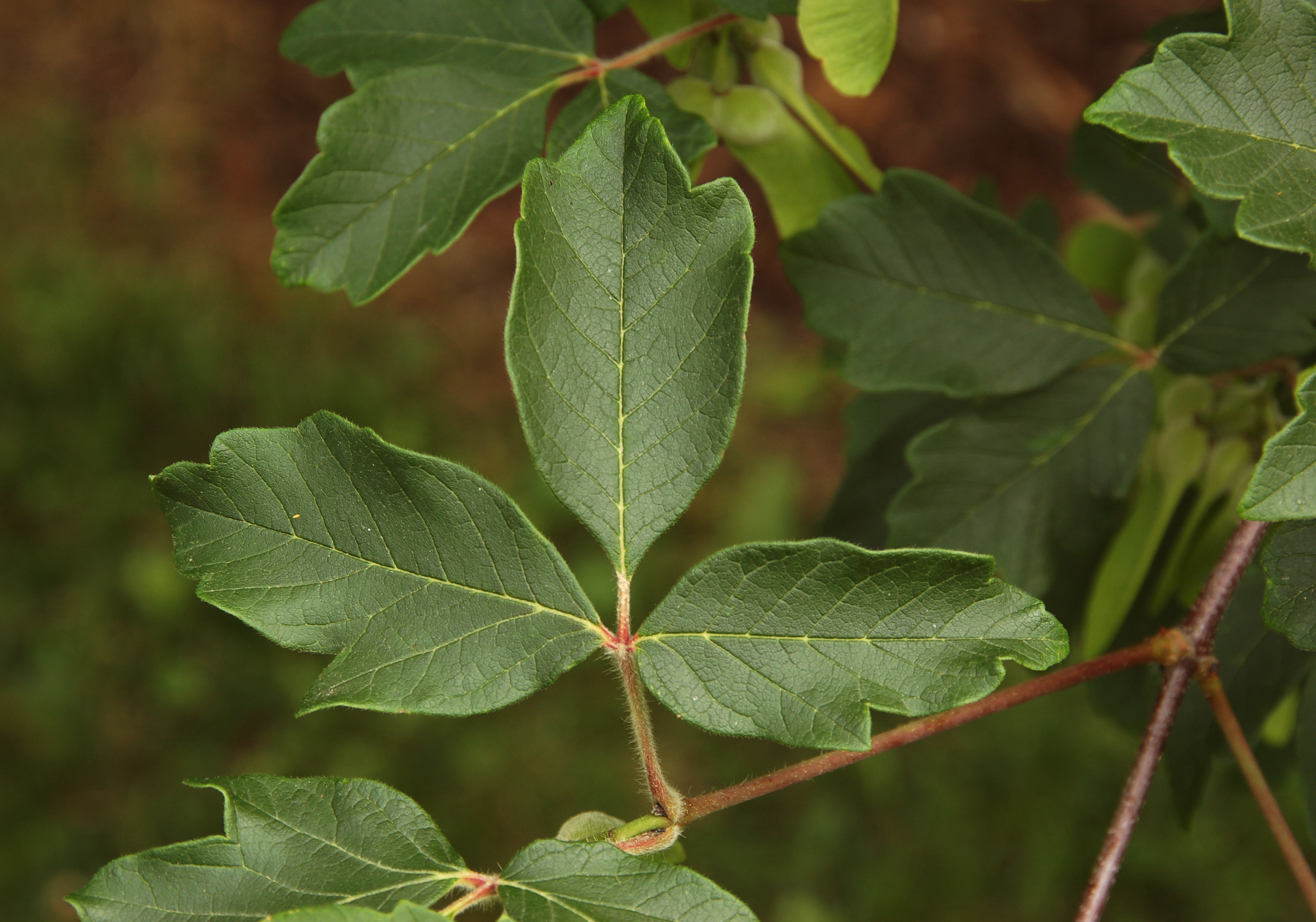
Acer griseum (paperbark maple)

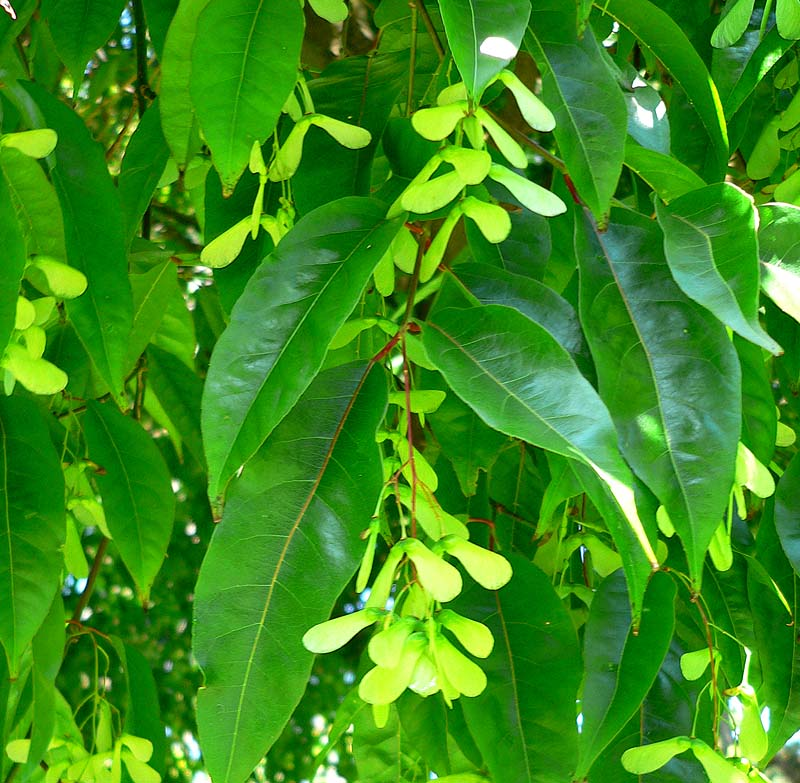
Acer laevigatum leaves and fruit

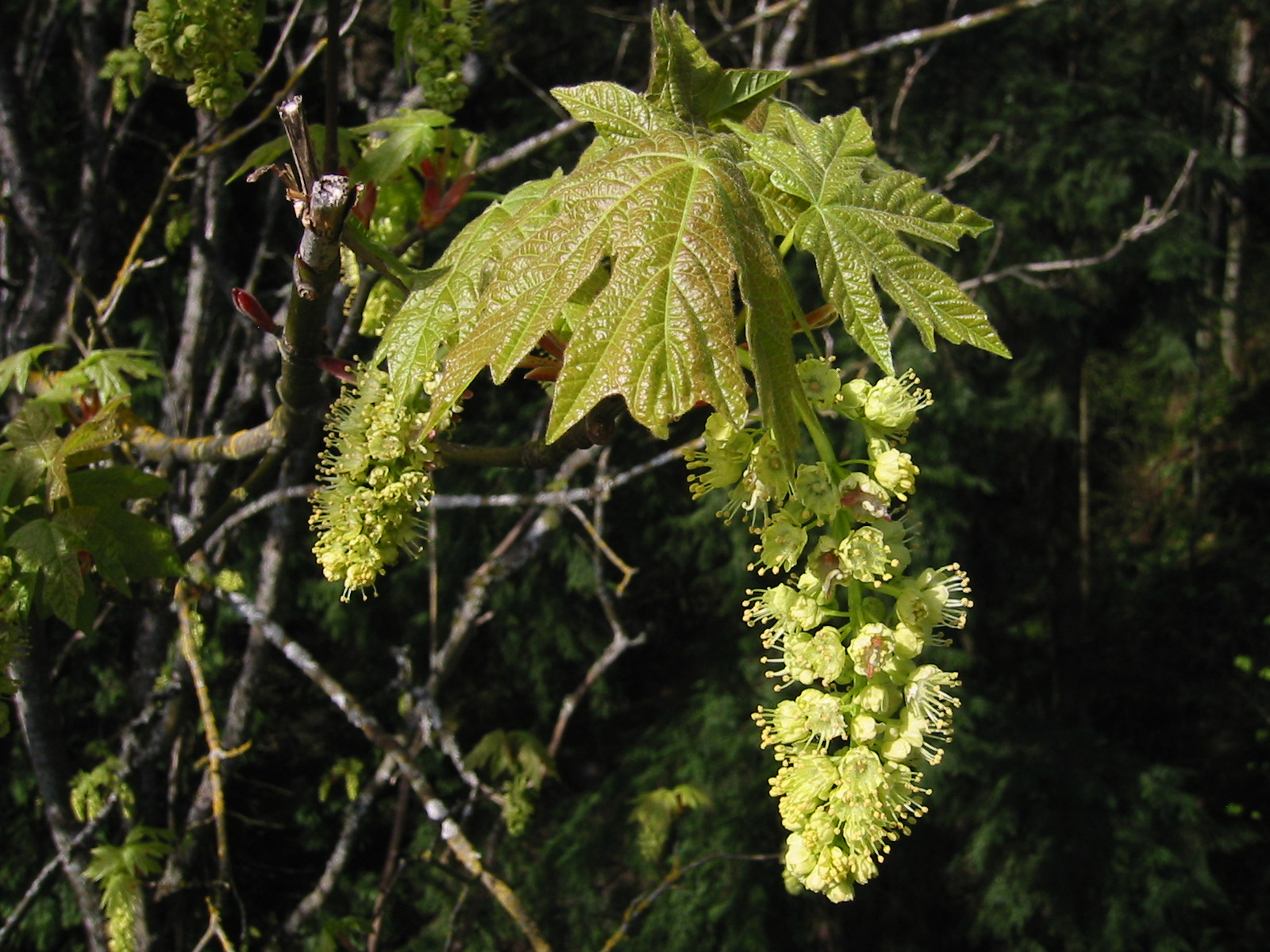
Acer macrophyllum flowers and young leaves

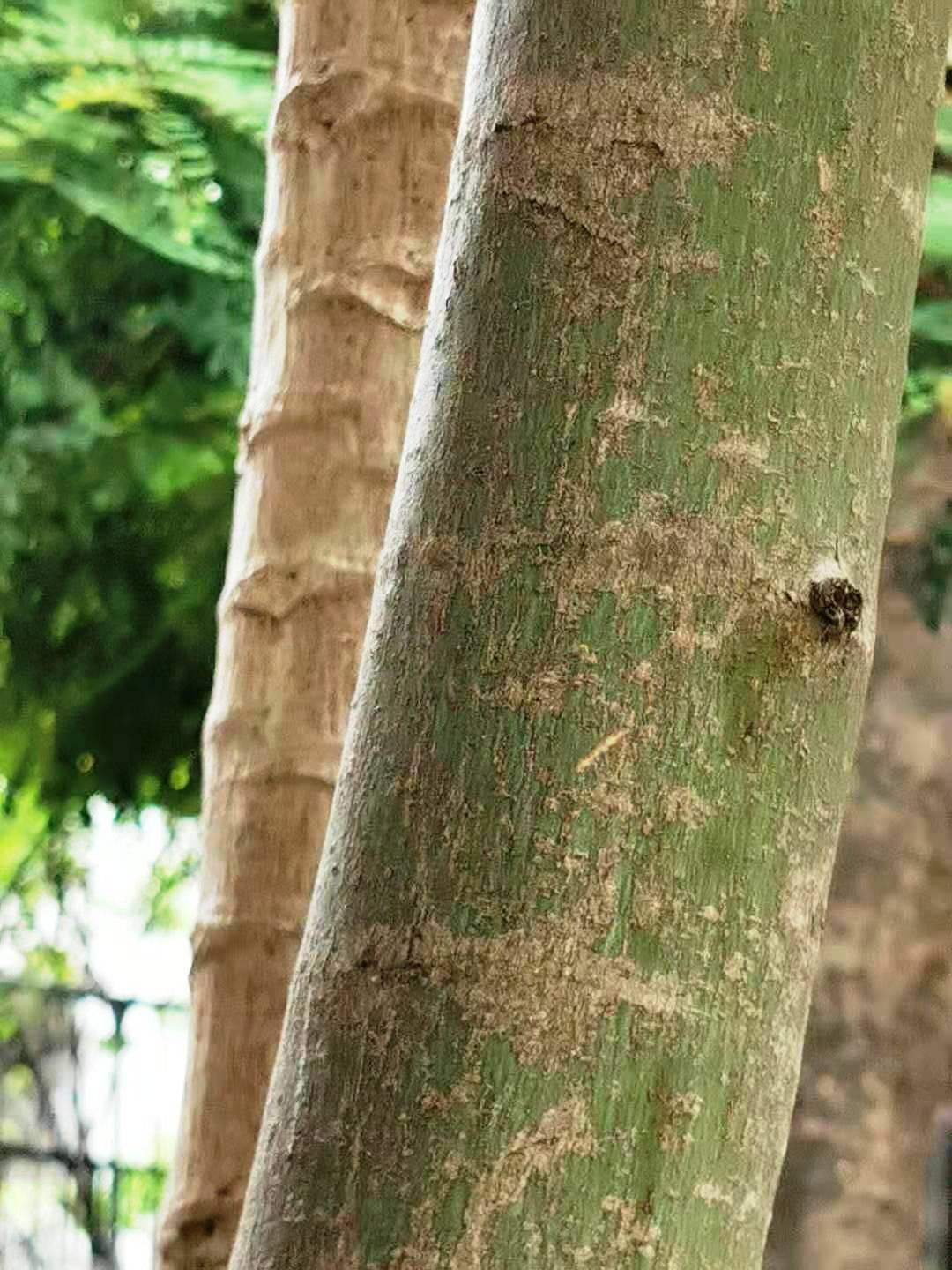
Acer oliverianum trunk

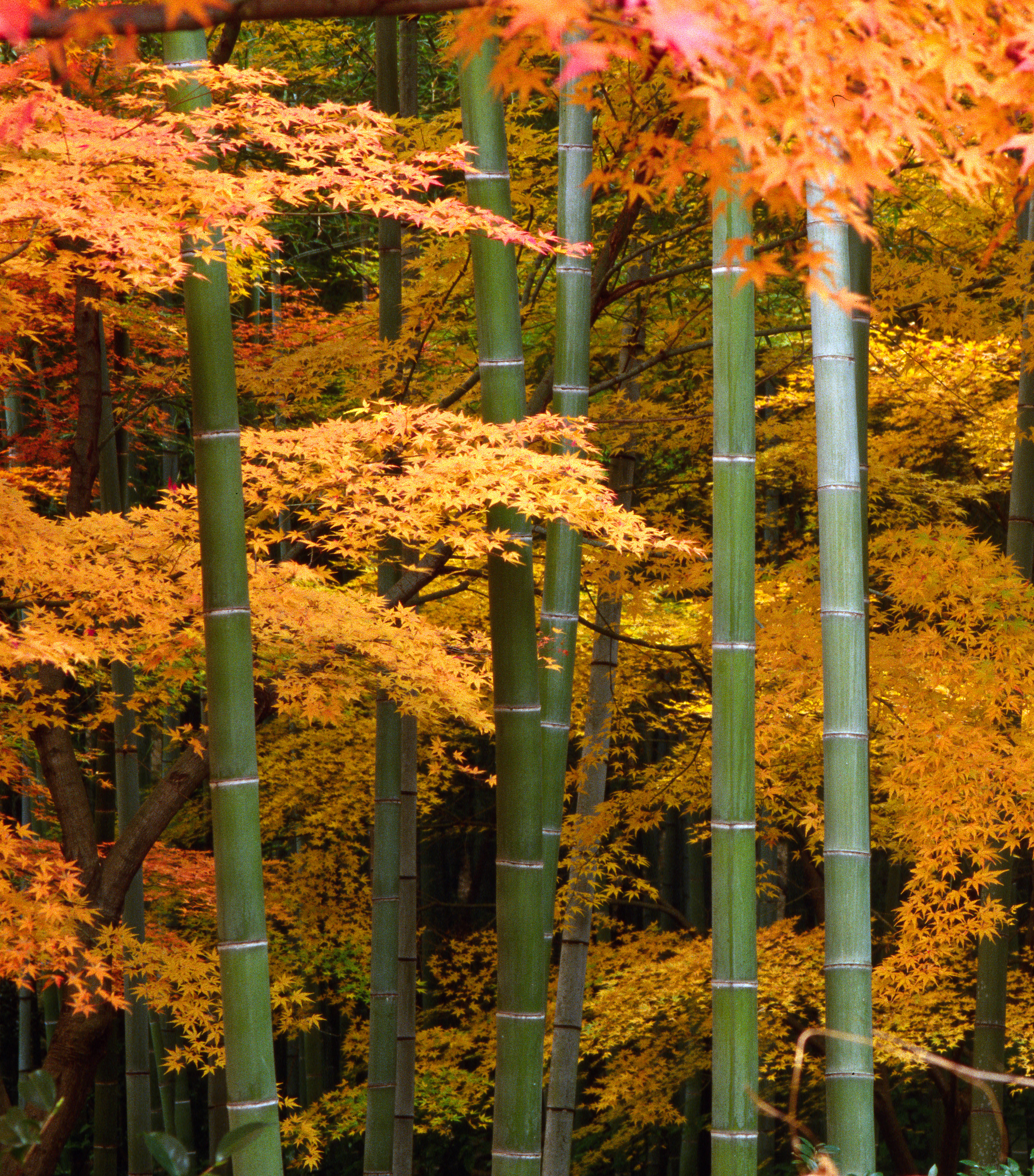
Acer palmatum trees and bamboo in Japan

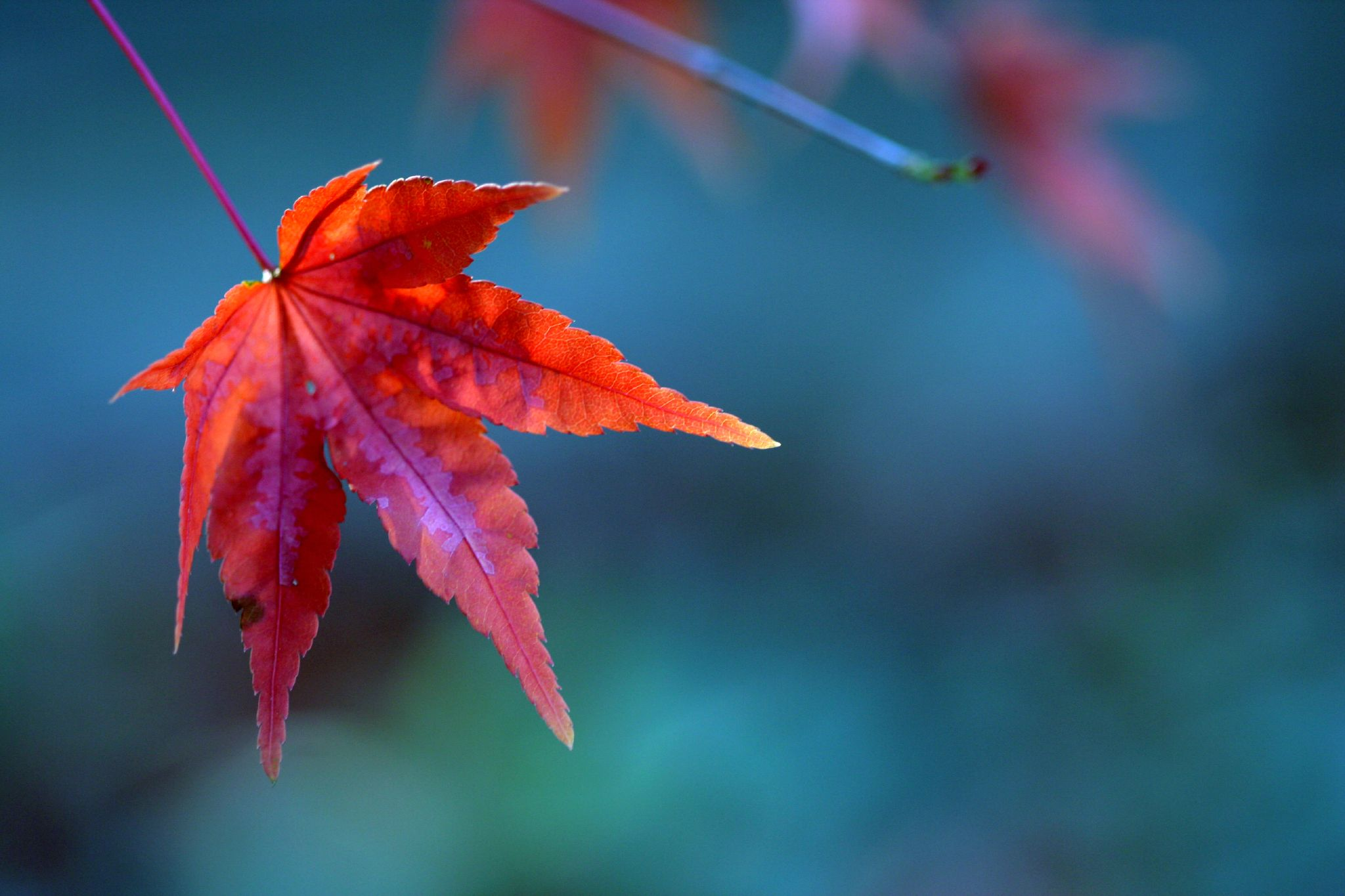
Acer palmatum leaf in autumn

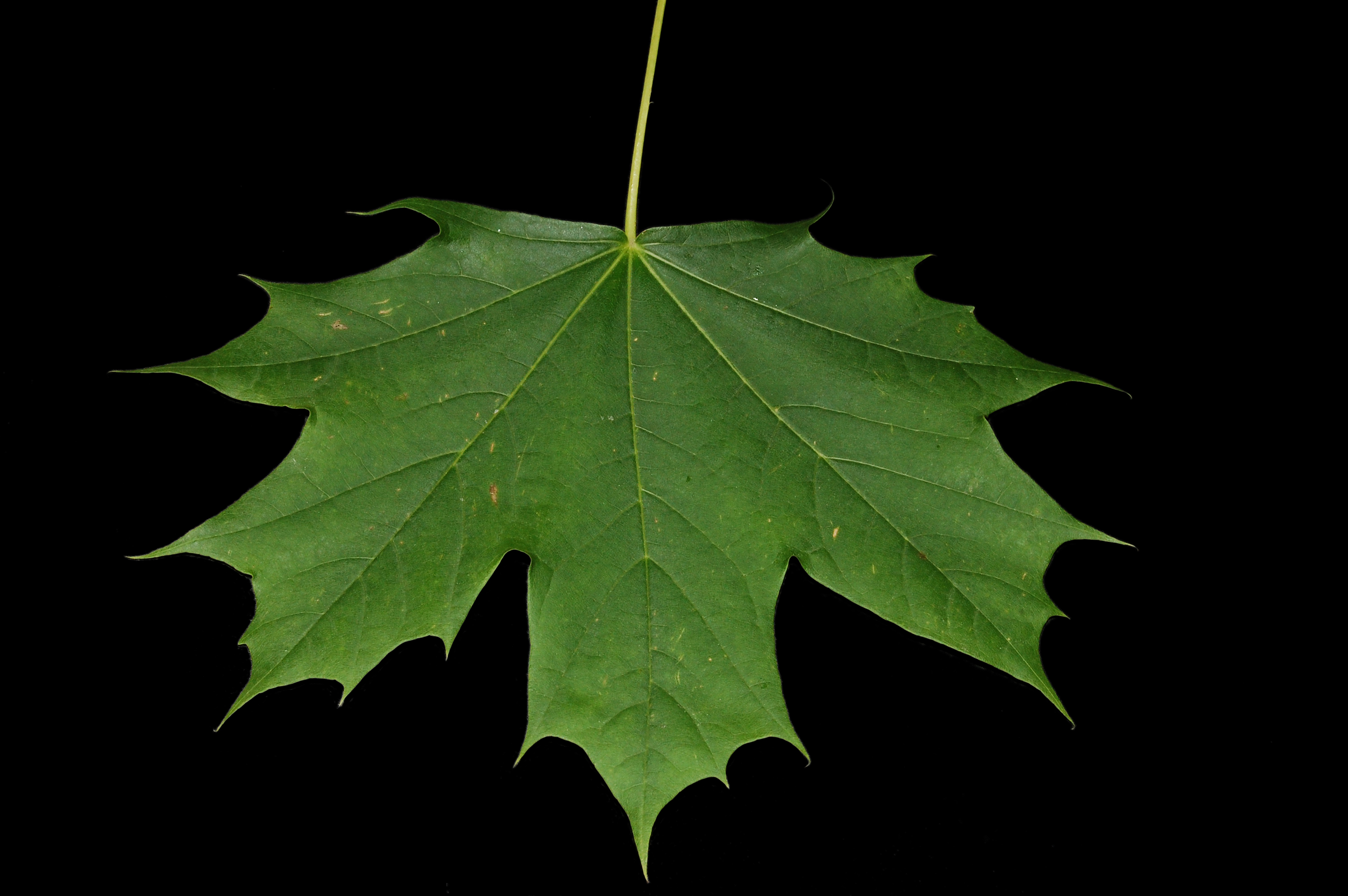
Acer platanoides leaf

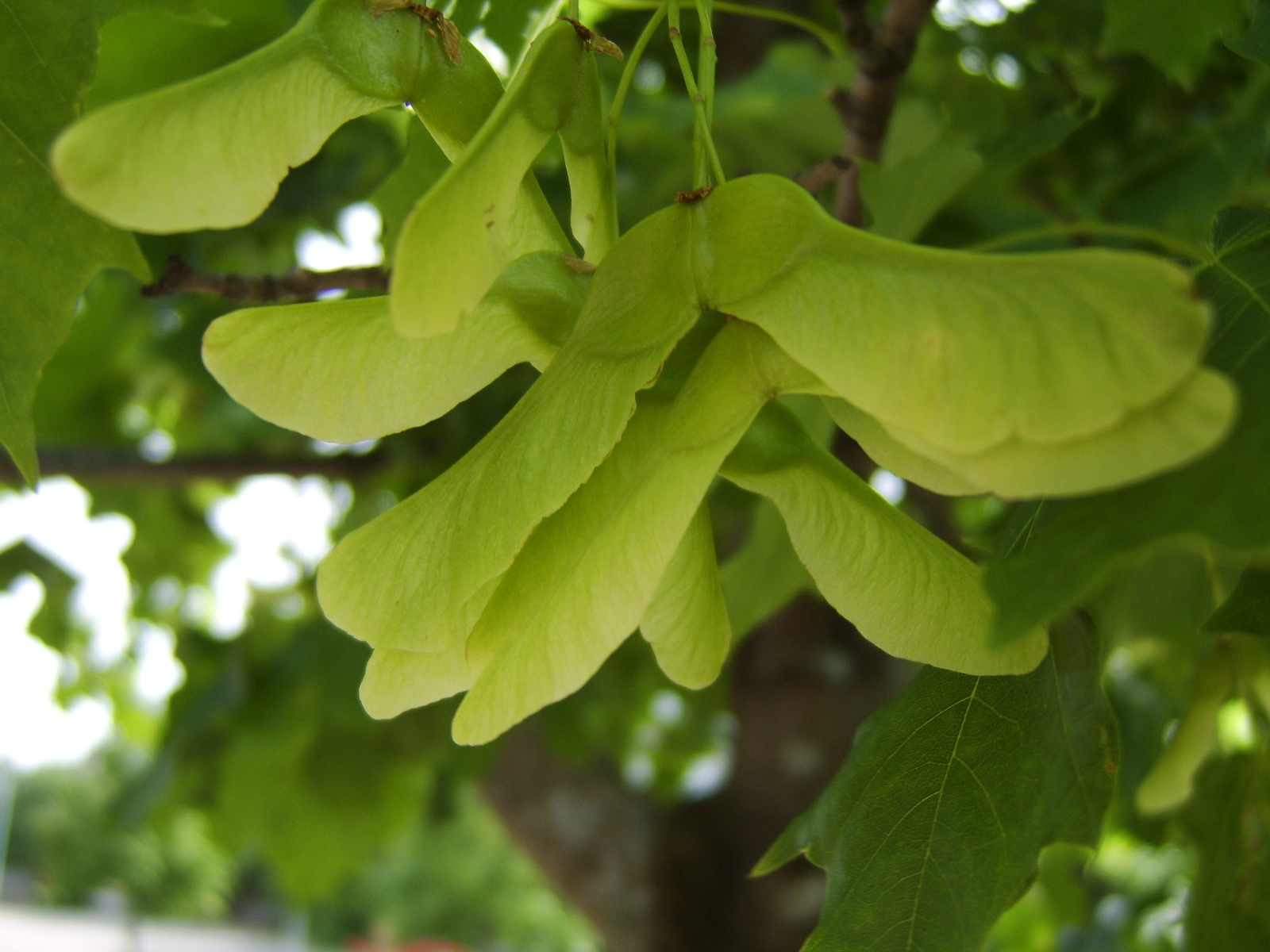
Acer platanoides (Norway maple) samaras

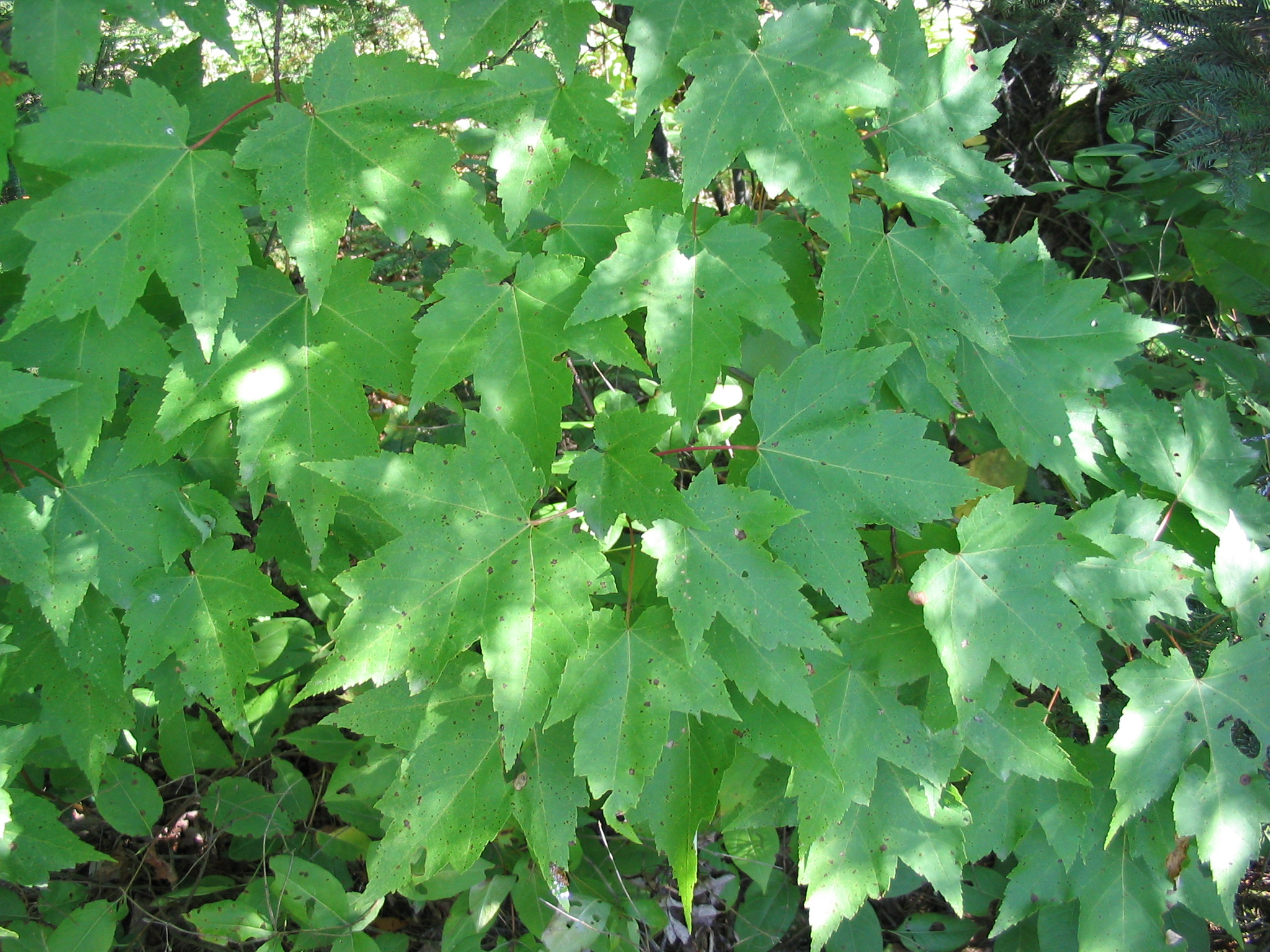
Acer rubrum leaves

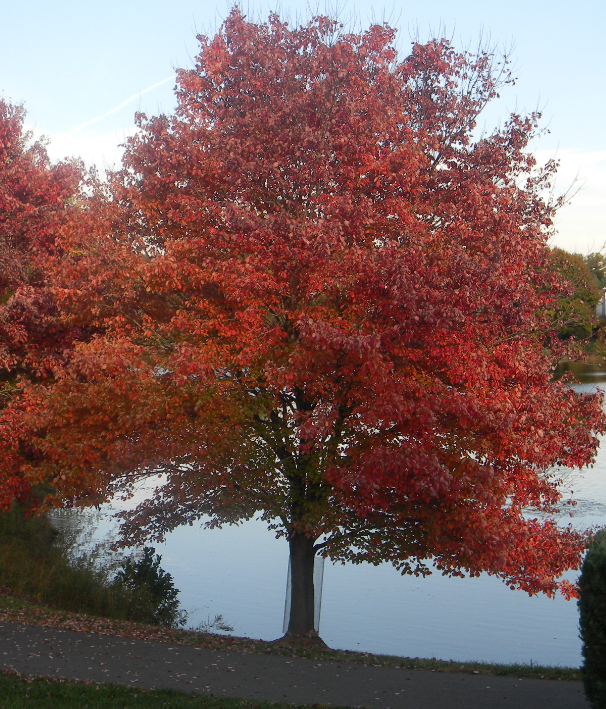
Acer rubrum tree in autumn

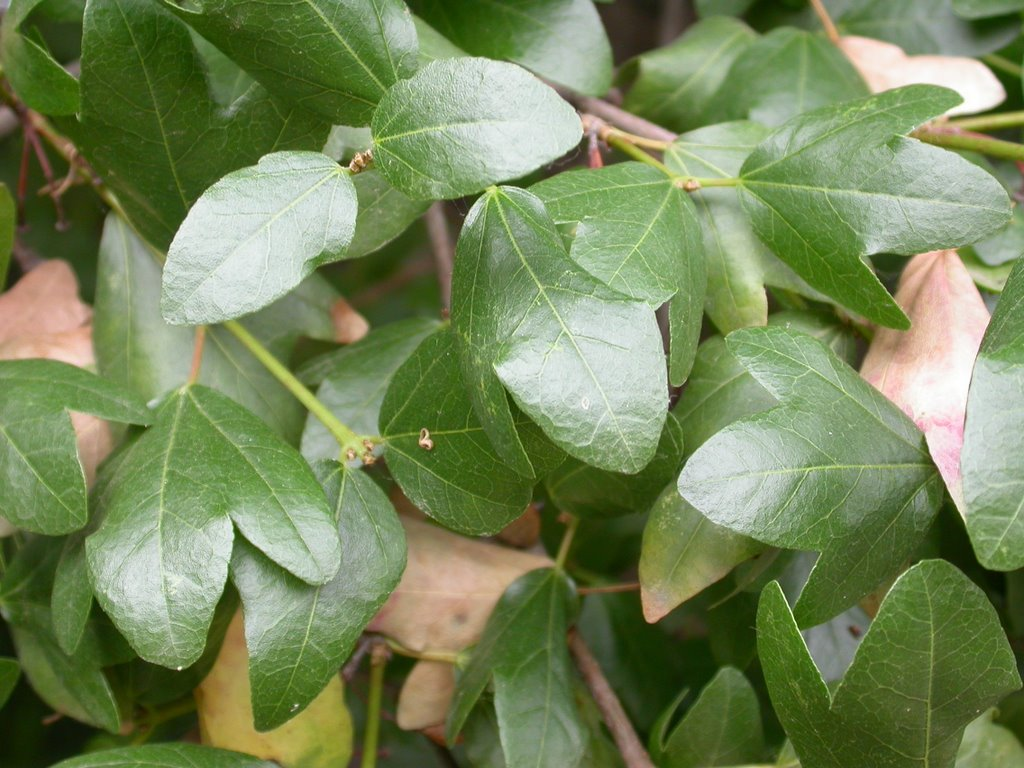
Acer sempervirens foliage

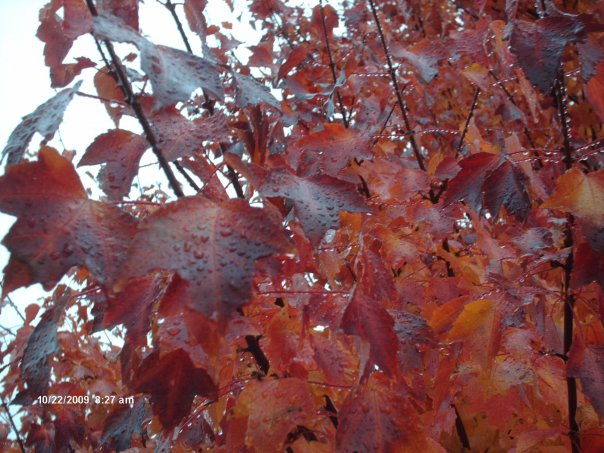
Acer × freemanii 'Autumn Blaze' (a cross between A. rubrum and A. saccharinum

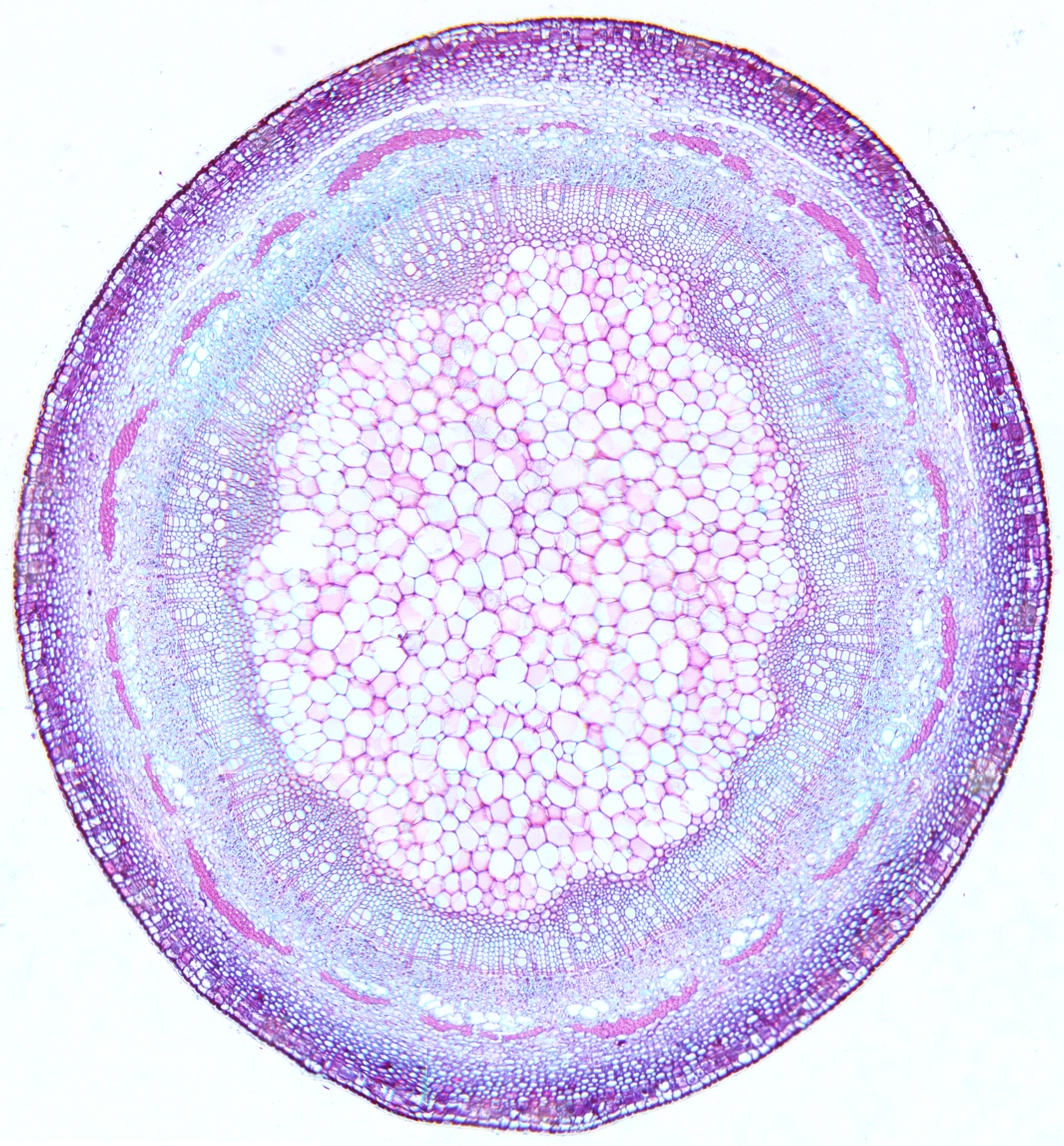
Maple acer stem 1 year 100x actual diameter 2.0-2.2mm

== See also ==
- List of Acer species
- List of Award of Garden Merit maples
- List of Danish Acers
- Mazer – a drinking vessel made from maple wood
- List of foods made from maple
