= List of Serjania species =

Serjania is a genus of plants in the family Sapindaceae. As of November 2024, Plants of the World Online accepted 254 species.

== A ==
- Serjania acoma Radlk.
- Serjania aculeata Radlk.
- Serjania acuminata Radlk.
- Serjania acupunctata Radlk.
- Serjania acuta Triana & Planch.
- Serjania acutidentata Radlk.
- Serjania adenophylla Ferrucci
- Serjania adiantoides Radlk.
- Serjania adusta Radlk.
- Serjania albida Radlk.
- Serjania altissima (Poepp.) Radlk.
- Serjania aluligera Radlk.
- Serjania ampelopsis Planch. & Linden
- Serjania amplifolia Radlk.
- Serjania angustifolia Willd.
- Serjania atrolineata C.Wright

== B ==
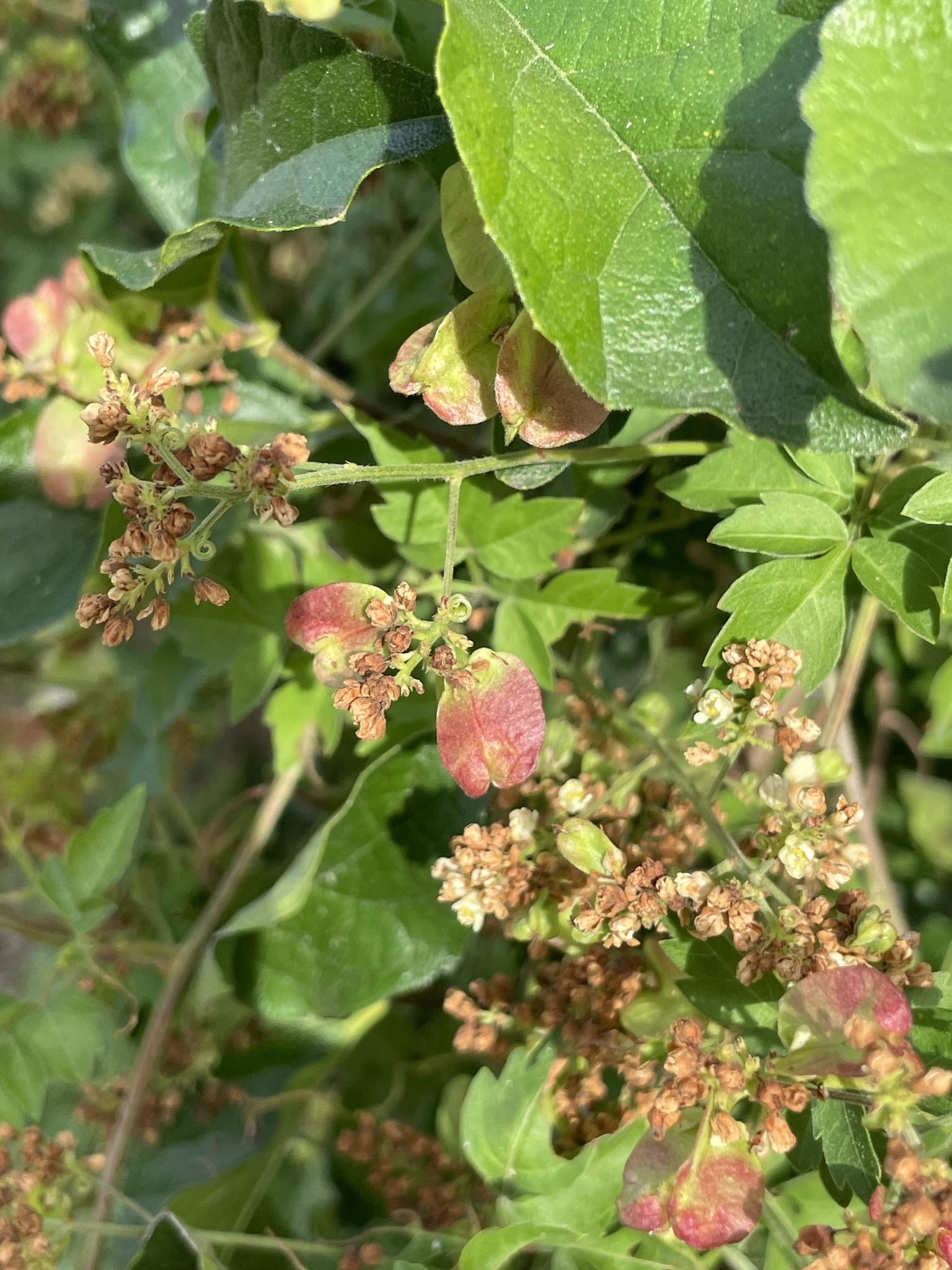
Serjania brachycarpa

- Serjania bahiana Ferrucci
- Serjania biternata (Weath.) Acev.-Rodr.
- Serjania brachycarpa A.Gray ex Radlk.
- Serjania brachylopha Radlk.
- Serjania brachyptera Radlk.
- Serjania brachystachya Radlk.
- Serjania bradeana Somner
- Serjania brevipes Benth.
- Serjania brevipetiolata Ferrucci & Somner

== C ==
- Serjania californica Radlk.
- Serjania calligera Radlk.
- Serjania cambessedesiana Schltdl. & Cham.
- Serjania caracasana (Jacq.) Willd.
- Serjania carautae Somner
- Serjania cardiospermoides Schltdl. & Cham.
- Serjania chacoensis Ferrucci & Acev.-Rodr.
- Serjania chaetocarpa Radlk.
- Serjania chartacea Radlk.
- Serjania circumvallata Radlk.
- Serjania cissoides Radlk.
- Serjania clematidea Triana & Planch.
- Serjania clematidifolia Cambess.
- Serjania columbiana Radlk.
- Serjania comata Radlk.
- Serjania communis Cambess.
- Serjania confertiflora Radlk.
- Serjania coradinii Ferrucci & Somner
- Serjania corindifolia Radlk.
- Serjania cornigera Turcz.
- Serjania corrugata Radlk.
- Serjania crassifolia Radlk.
- Serjania crassinervis Radlk.
- Serjania crenata Griseb.
- Serjania cristobaliae (Ferrucci & Urdampill.) Ferrucci & V.W.Steinm.
- Serjania crucensis Ferrucci & V.W.Steinm.
- Serjania cuneolata Radlk.
- Serjania curassavica (L.) Radlk.
- Serjania cystocarpa Radlk.

== D ==
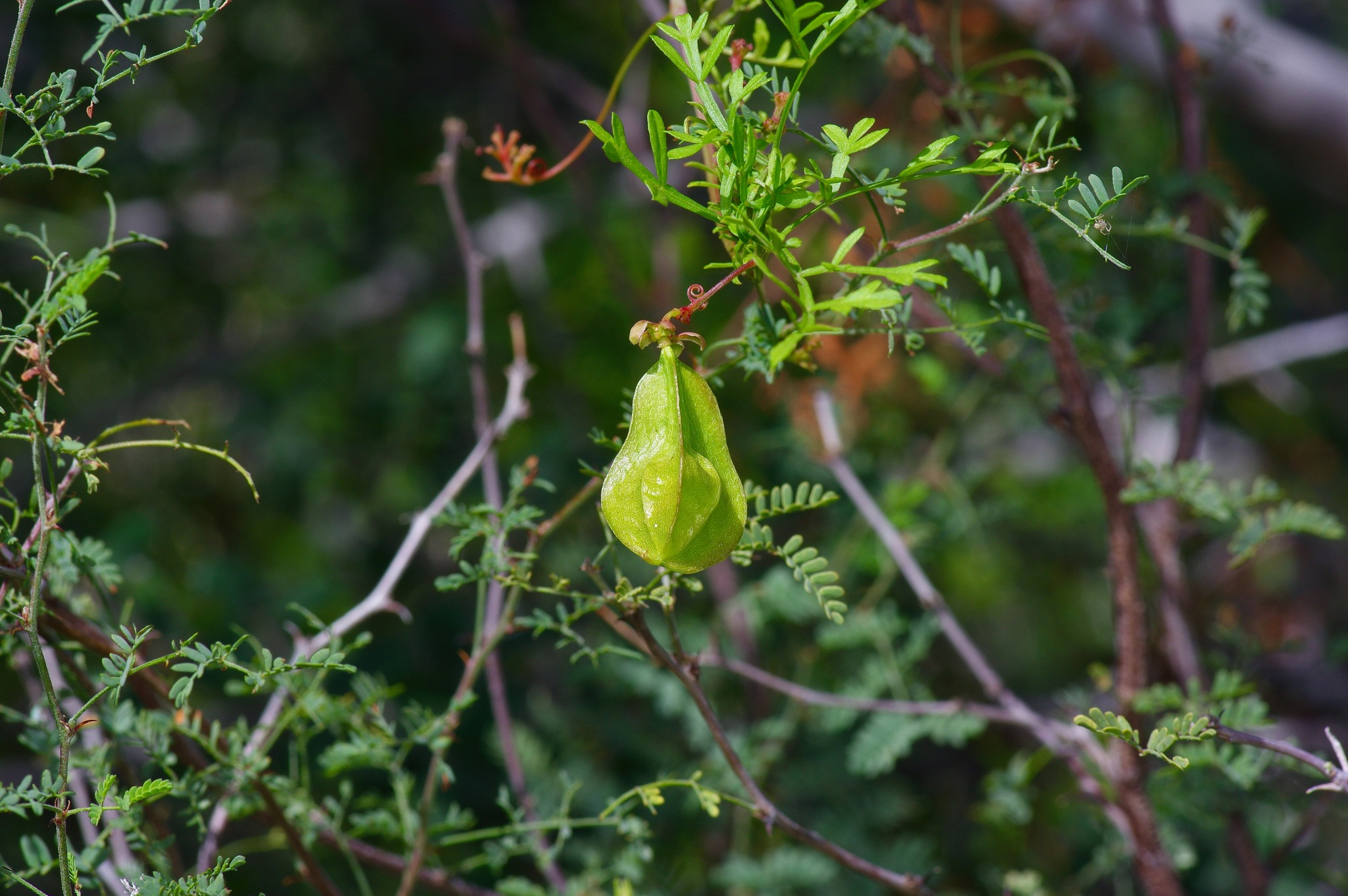
Serjania dissecta

- Serjania darcyi Croat
- Serjania dasyclados Radlk.
- Serjania decemstriata Radlk.
- Serjania deflexa Gardner
- Serjania deltoidea Radlk.
- Serjania dentata (Vell.) Radlk.
- Serjania depauperata Radlk.
- Serjania dibotrya Poepp.
- Serjania didymadenia Radlk.
- Serjania diffusa Radlk.
- Serjania dissecta (S.Watson) Ferrucci & V.W.Steinm.
- Serjania divaricaticocca Somner & Acev.-Rodr.
- Serjania diversifolia (Jacq.) Radlk.
- Serjania dumicola Radlk.
- Serjania dura Radlk.

== E ==
- Serjania elegans Cambess.
- Serjania elongata J.F.Macbr.
- Serjania emarginata Kunth
- Serjania equestris Macfad.
- Serjania erecta Radlk.
- Serjania eriocarpa Radlk.
- Serjania erythrocaulis Acev.-Rodr. & Somner
- Serjania espiritosantensis Somner
- Serjania eucardia Radlk.

== F ==
- Serjania faveolata Radlk.
- Serjania ferruginea (Lindl.) Mabb.
- Serjania filicifolia Radlk.
- Serjania flaviflora Radlk.
- Serjania fluminensis Acev.-Rodr.
- Serjania foveata Griseb.
- Serjania frutescens V.W.Steinm. & Ferrucci
- Serjania fusca Radlk.
- Serjania fuscifolia Radlk.
- Serjania fuscopunctata Radlk.
- Serjania fuscostriata Radlk.

== G ==
- Serjania glabrata Kunth
- Serjania glandulosa Ferrucci & Somner
- Serjania goniocarpa Radlk.
- Serjania gracilis Radlk.
- Serjania grammatophora Radlk.
- Serjania grandiceps Radlk.
- Serjania grandidens Radlk.
- Serjania grandifolia Sagot ex Radlk.
- Serjania grandis Seem.
- Serjania grazielae Somner
- Serjania grosii Schltdl.
- Serjania guerrerensis (Cruz Durán & K.Vega) Acev.-Rodr.

== H ==
- Serjania hamuligera Radlk.
- Serjania hatschbachii Ferrucci
- Serjania hebecarpa Benth.
- Serjania herteri Ferrucci
- Serjania heterocarpa Standl.
- Serjania hispida Standl. & Steyerm.

== I ==
- Serjania ichthyctona Radlk.
- Serjania impressa Radlk.
- Serjania incana Radlk.
- Serjania incisa Torr.
- Serjania inebrians Radlk.
- Serjania inflata Poepp.
- Serjania inscripta Radlk.
- Serjania insignis Radlk.
- Serjania itatiaiensis Somner

== L ==
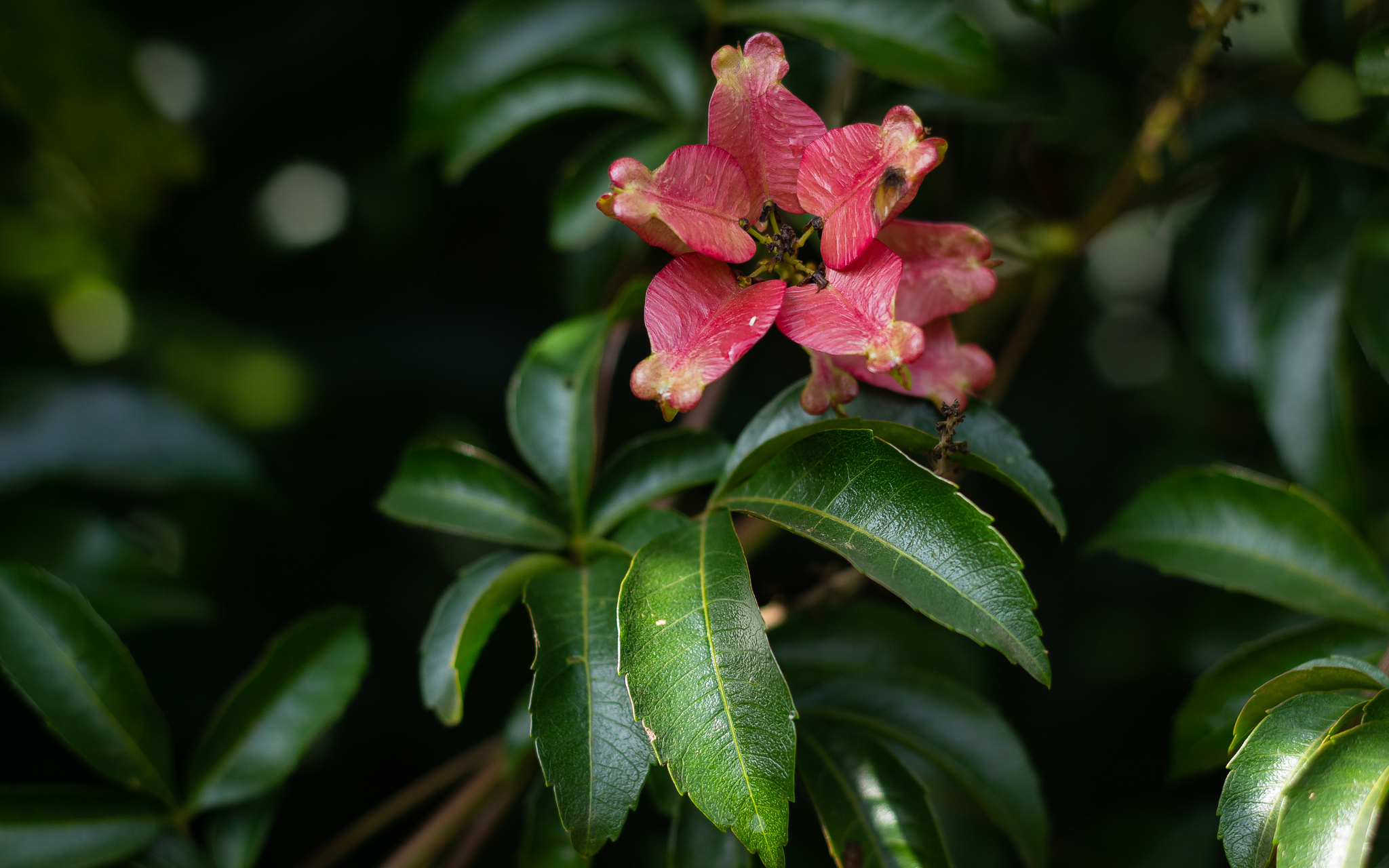
Serjania laruotteana

- Serjania lachnocarpa (Benth. ex Radlk.) Acev.-Rodr.
- Serjania laevigata Radlk.
- Serjania lamelligera Radlk.
- Serjania lamprophylla Radlk.
- Serjania lancistipula Acev.-Rodr.
- Serjania laruotteana Cambess.
- Serjania lateritia Radlk.
- Serjania laxiflora Radlk.
- Serjania leptocarpa Radlk.
- Serjania lethalis A.St.-Hil.
- Serjania leucosepala Radlk.
- Serjania lineariifolia Lippold
- Serjania littoralis Somner & Ferrucci
- Serjania lobulata Standl. & Steyerm.
- Serjania longipes Radlk.
- Serjania longistipula Radlk.
- Serjania lucianoi Ferrucci & Coulleri
- Serjania lucida Schumach.
- Serjania lundellii Croat

== M ==
- Serjania macrocarpa Standl. & Steyerm.
- Serjania macrococca Radlk.
- Serjania macrolopha (Radlk.) Acev.-Rodr. & Ferrucci
- Serjania macrostachya Radlk.
- Serjania magnistipulata Acev.-Rodr.
- Serjania mansiana Mart.
- Serjania marginata Casar.
- Serjania matogrossensis Ferrucci & Acev.-Rodr.
- Serjania membranacea Splitg.
- Serjania meridionalis Cambess.
- Serjania mexicana (L.) Willd.
- Serjania microphylla Lippold
- Serjania minutiflora Radlk.
- Serjania mollis Kunth
- Serjania monogyna Hoffmanns. ex Schltdl.
- Serjania morii Acev.-Rodr.
- Serjania mucronulata Radlk.
- Serjania multiflora Cambess.

== N ==
- Serjania neei Acev.-Rodr.
- Serjania nigricans Radlk.
- Serjania nipensis Urb.
- Serjania nodosa (Jacq.) Radlk.
- Serjania noxia Cambess.
- Serjania nutans Poepp.

== O ==
- Serjania oaxacana Standl.
- Serjania obtusidentata Radlk.
- Serjania occidentalis Lippold
- Serjania ochroclada Radlk.
- Serjania orbicularis Radlk.
- Serjania ovalifolia Radlk.
- Serjania oxyphylla Kunth
- Serjania oxytoma Radlk.

== P ==
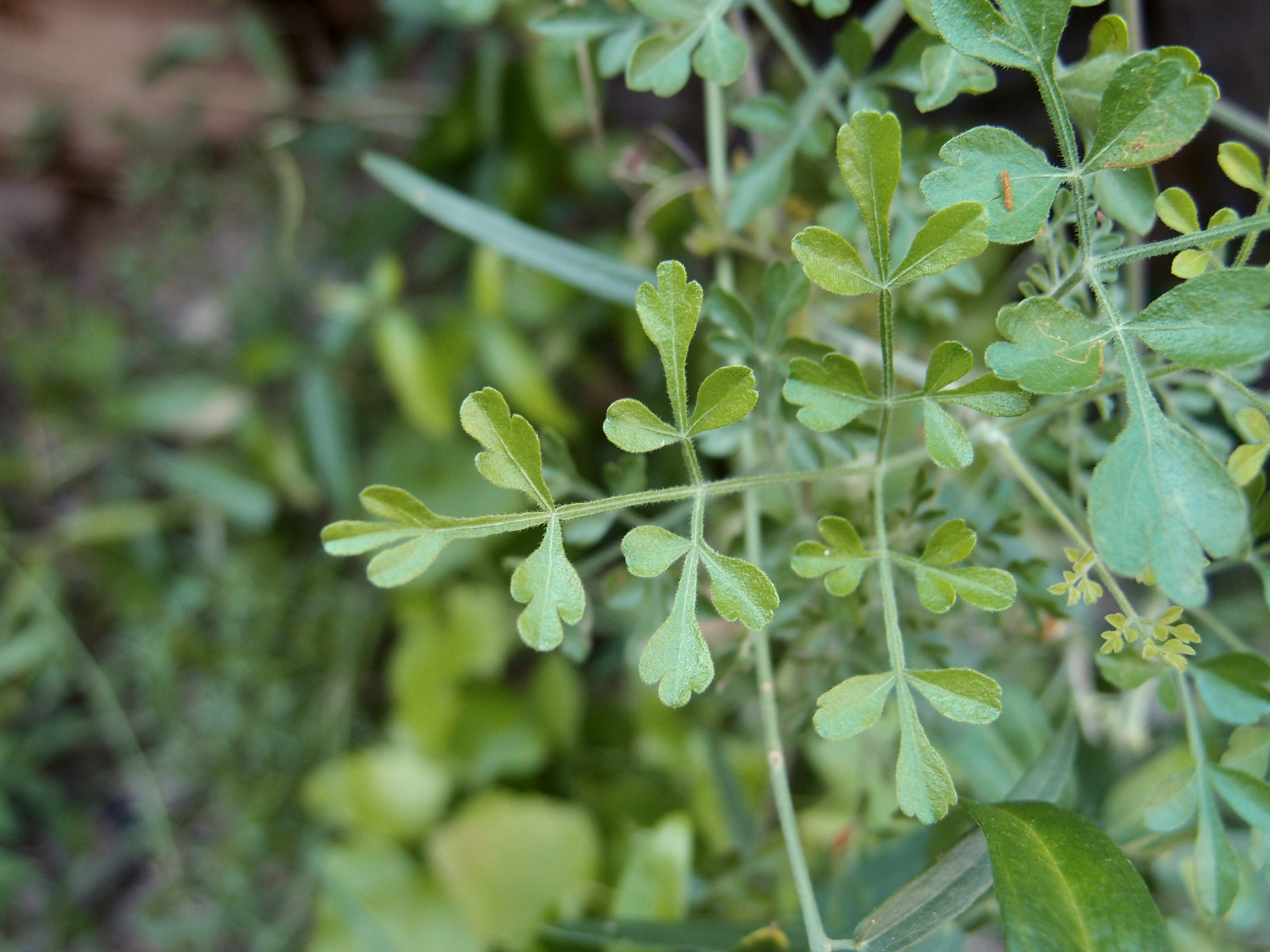
Serjania palmeri

- Serjania pacifica Standl.
- Serjania paleata Radlk.
- Serjania palmeri S.Watson
- Serjania paludosa Cambess.
- Serjania paniculata Kunth
- Serjania pannifolia Radlk.
- Serjania paradoxa Radlk.
- Serjania paranensis Ferrucci & Acev.-Rodr.
- Serjania parvifolia Kunth
- Serjania paucidentata DC.
- Serjania pedicellaris Radlk.
- Serjania pernambucensis Radlk.
- Serjania perulacea Radlk.
- Serjania peruviana Radlk.
- Serjania phaseoloides Standl. & Steyerm.
- Serjania pinnatifolia Radlk.
- Serjania piscatoria Radlk.
- Serjania platycarpa Benth.
- Serjania plicata Radlk.
- Serjania pluvialiflorens Croat
- Serjania polyphylla (L.) Radlk.
- Serjania polystachya (Turcz.) Radlk.
- Serjania psilophylla Radlk.
- Serjania pteleifolia Diels
- Serjania pterarthra Standl.
- Serjania punctata Radlk.
- Serjania punctulata Radlk.
- Serjania purpurascens Radlk.
- Serjania pygmaea (Radlk.) Ferrucci & Medina
- Serjania pyramidata Radlk.

== R ==
- Serjania racemosa Schumach.
- Serjania rachiptera Radlk.
- Serjania regnellii Schltdl.
- Serjania rekoi Standl.
- Serjania reticulata Cambess.
- Serjania rhombea Radlk.
- Serjania rhytidococca Acev.-Rodr.
- Serjania rigida Radlk.
- Serjania rosalindae Ferrucci & V.W.Steinm.
- Serjania rubicaulis Benth. ex Radlk.
- Serjania rubicunda Radlk.
- Serjania rufa Radlk.
- Serjania rufisepala Radlk.
- Serjania rutifolia Radlk.
- Serjania rzedowskiana Ferrucci & V.W.Steinm.

== S ==
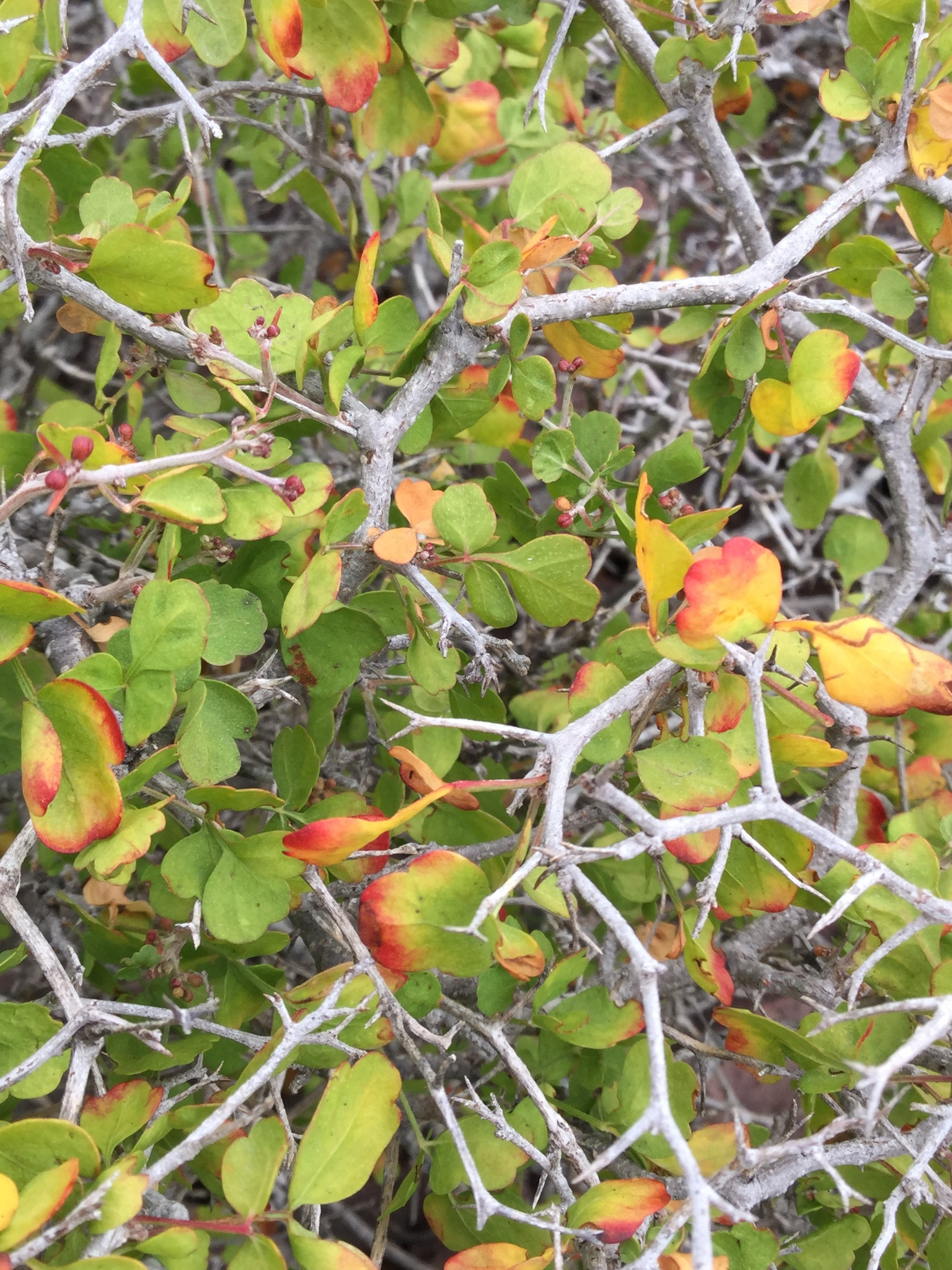
Serjania spinosa

- Serjania salzmanniana Schltdl.
- Serjania schiedeana Schltdl.
- Serjania scopulifera Radlk.
- Serjania seriana (L.) Druce
- Serjania serjanioides (Rzed. & Calderón) Acev.-Rodr.
- Serjania serrata Radlk.
- Serjania setigera Radlk.
- Serjania sonorensis (S.Watson) Ferrucci & V.W.Steinm.
- Serjania souzana Ferrucci & Acev.-Rodr.
- Serjania sphaerococca Radlk.
- Serjania sphenocarpa Radlk.
- Serjania spinosa (Radlk.) Ferrucci & V.W.Steinm.
- Serjania squarrosa Radlk.
- Serjania striata Radlk.
- Serjania striolata Radlk.
- Serjania subdentata Juss. ex Poir.
- Serjania subimpunctata Radlk.
- Serjania suborbicularis Radlk.
- Serjania subrotundifolia Radlk.
- Serjania subtriplinervis Radlk.
- Serjania sufferruginea Radlk.

== T ==
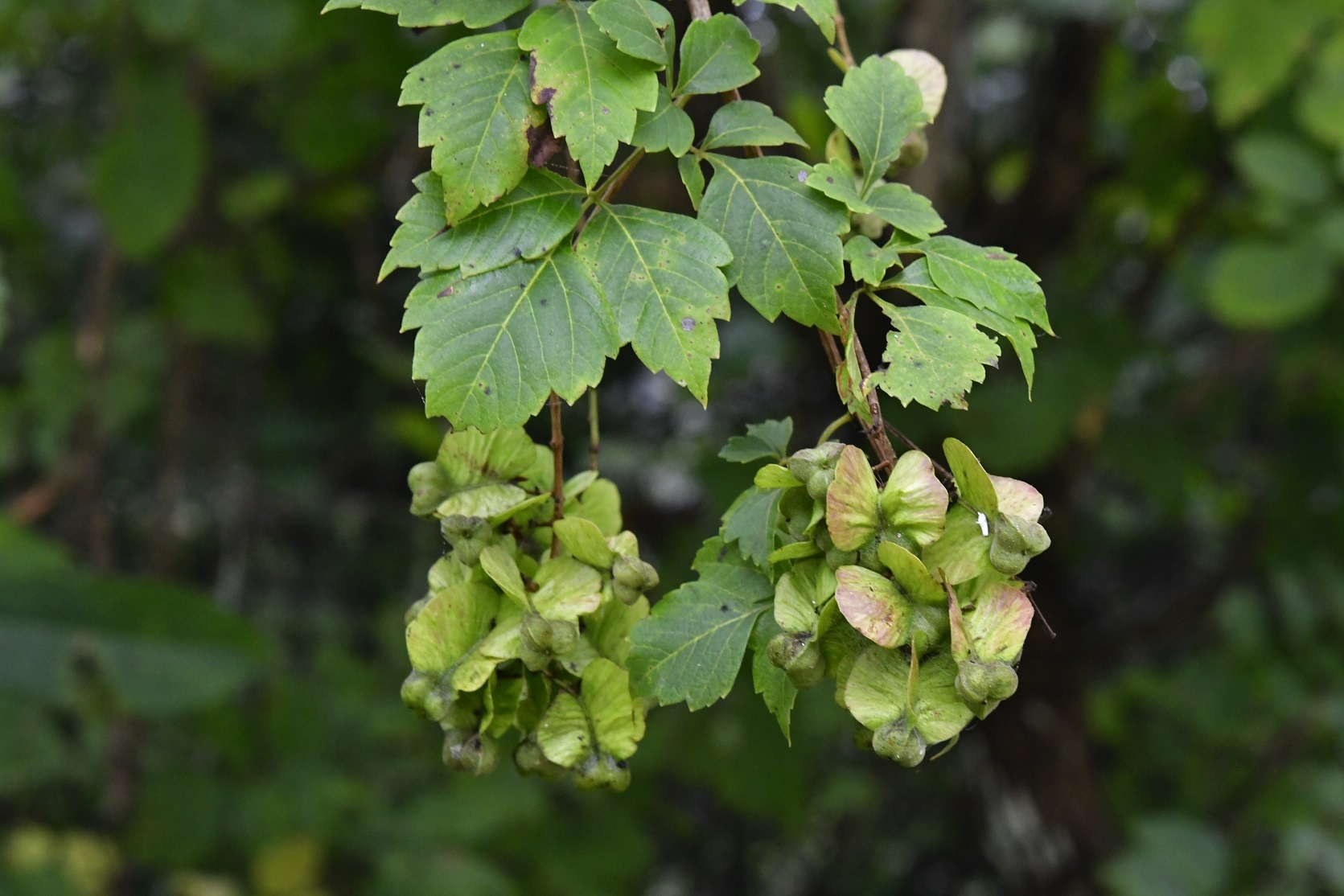
Serjania triquetra

- Serjania tailloniana Standl. & L.O.Williams
- Serjania tenuifolia Radlk.
- Serjania tenuis Radlk.
- Serjania thoracoides Radlk.
- Serjania tortuosa (Benth.) Ferrucci & V.W.Steinm.
- Serjania trachygona Radlk.
- Serjania trichomisca Radlk.
- Serjania tricostata Radlk.
- Serjania trifoliolata Radlk.
- Serjania tripleuria Ferrucci
- Serjania triquetra Radlk.
- Serjania trirostris Radlk.
- Serjania tristis Radlk.
- Serjania truncata Radlk.

== U ==
- Serjania unguiculata Radlk.
- Serjania unidentata Acev.-Rodr.
- Serjania urvilleoides (Radlk.) Ferrucci & Urdampill.

== V ==
- Serjania valerii Standl.
- Serjania velutina Cambess.
- Serjania vesicosa Radlk.

== Y ==
- Serjania yucatanensis Standl.
