= Moose maple =

Moose maple may refer to two different species of maples:

- Acer pensylvanicum, striped maple
- Acer spicatum, mountain maple
