= Acer whitebirdense =

Acer whitebirdense Temporal range: Middle Miocene

Scientific classification
- Kingdom: Plantae
- Clade: Tracheophytes
- Clade: Angiosperms
- Clade: Eudicots
- Clade: Rosids
- Order: Sapindales
- Family: Sapindaceae
- Genus: Acer
- Section: Acer sect. Rubra
- Species: †A. whitebirdense

Binomial name
- †Acer whitebirdense (Ashlee) Wolfe & Tanai, 1987

Synonyms
- Viburnum whitebirdense

Extinct species of maple

Acer whitebirdense is an extinct maple species in the family Sapindaceae described from a number of fossil leaves and samaras. The species is known from Miocene sediments exposed in Idaho, Oregon and Washington in the United States. It is one of several extinct species belonging to the living section Rubra.

== History and classification ==
Acer whitebirdense is known from a number of isolated leaves and fruits found in central Idaho, northeastern Oregon, and central and eastern Washington state. The holotype specimen was collected from exposures of the Latah Formation at White Bird, Idaho, and both leaves and fruits have been recovered from White Bird. Fruits are also identified from the Latah formation outcrops near Grand Coulee, Washington, the Brickyard and Spokane, Portland & Seattle Railway roadcut in Spokane, Washington. In Oregon, fruits and leaves were identified by Wolfe and Toshimasa Tanai from a site near "Baker", and isolated fruits were noted from the Stinking water flora of central Oregon. Dating of volcanic tuffs associated with the Latah Formation at White Bird and Sucker Creek Formation at Sucker Creek in 2012 showed an age range from approximately 15.6 million years ago to 14.8 million years ago, placing the species into the Middle Miocene.

Leaves assigned by Wolfe and Tanai to A. whitebirdense were first described in 1932 by Thomas Ashlee as "Viburnum" whitebirdensis. Edward W. Berry in 1934 described leaves from White Bird as A. florissanti and Platanus dissecta respectively, plus a fruit as A. oregonianum. Later, in 1937, Roland W. Brown described White Bird leaves as Acer osmonti. Some leaves examined by Ralph Chaney and Daniel Axelrod were suggested to be Rubus species leaves and not Acer. When the White Bird fossils were re-examined, Wolfe and Tanai concluded that there was only one Acer species present at White Bird, and since the oldest species name applied to the fossils was "Viburnum"whitebirdensis, they moved the species to Acer as A. whitebirdense.

Based on the vein structuring in the fruits, Wolfe and Tanai inferred that A. whitebirdense was a probable descendant of A. kenaicum, known from the Oligocene of Alaska. They also suggested that the late Miocene species A. taggarti was a descendant of A. whitebirdense, based on similarities in the leaves. The nutlet venation of A. whitebirdense is similar to the living North American species A. saccharinum, but the two species differ in the leaves. Following the Acer taxonomy structure defined by Japanese botanist Ken Ogata, they placed the species and related fossils into the Acer section Eriocarpa. Later work on the systematics of the genus resulted in section Eriocarpa being included into section Rubra.

== Description ==
Leaves of A. whitebirdense are simple in structure, with perfectly actinodromous vein structure and have an orbiculate outline. The leaves are five-lobed with upper-middle side lobes that are three-fourths as long as the middle lobe. The outermost side lobes are only half as long as the upper middle side lobes, and all the lobes range between orbiculate and triangular in outline. The leaves have an overall size range of approximately 7 cm (2.8 in) to an estimated 20 cm (7.9 in), and widths ranging between 7.0 and 29.0 cm (2.8 and 11.4 in). The leaves have five primary veins, five to seven secondary veins that diverge from the most apical primary veins and six to eight medial secondary vein pairs. The third order veins are spaced between 0.2–1.0 cm (0.079–0.394 in) apart and the fourth order venation form a pattern of irregular polygons. The fifth order veins forking from the fourth order veins form quadrangular areoles.

The fruits are a samara with the nutlet at the base and a wing extending up from the nutlet. The elliptical nutlet ranges between 1.0–2.7 cm (0.39–1.06 in) in length, with a 0.2–0.7 cm (0.079–0.276 in) long attachment scar along the wing base. Five to seven veins spread from the attachment scar across the nutlet and then converge slightly at the nut tip before extending into the wing. The wings are between 1.0 and 4.0 cm (0.39 and 1.57 in) long and having a broadly curving upper side. The nutlet is close to one third of the length of the whole samara and the ratio of nutlet to wing is 1:2. Due to this the wings may have had a center of mass too close to the wing base for autogyration, or spinning. This led Wolfe and Tanai to suggest that the fruits may have been dispersed by animals and would have fallen straight to the ground, rather than spinning in the wind.
