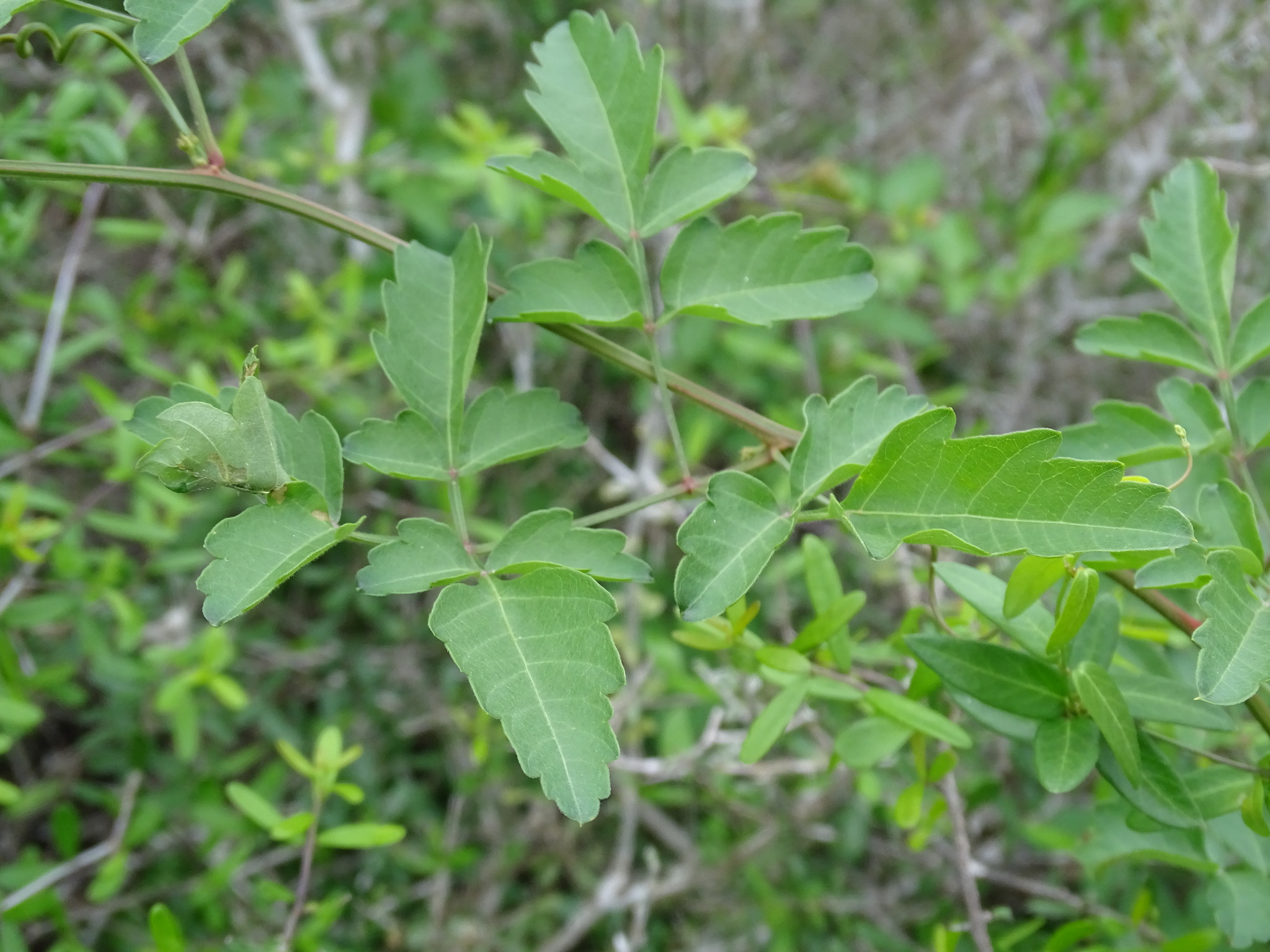

Conservation status
- Apparently Secure (NatureServe)

Scientific classification
- Kingdom: Plantae
- Clade: Embryophytes
- Clade: Tracheophytes
- Clade: Spermatophytes
- Clade: Angiosperms
- Clade: Eudicots
- Clade: Rosids
- Order: Sapindales
- Family: Sapindaceae
- Genus: Serjania
- Species: S. brachycarpa

Binomial name
- Serjania brachycarpa A.Gray ex Radlk.

Synonyms
- Cururu brachycarpa House

= Serjania brachycarpa =

Species of flowering plant

Serjania brachycarpa, often referred to as the littlefruit slipplejack, is a vine in the soapberry family. It is native to Central America, Mexico, and south Texas.

It is host to butterflies of the species epiphile adrasta.

== Description ==
Serjania brachycarpa is a perennial woody vine with ribbed stems that climbs surfaces with tendrils. The leaves are compound and covered in fuzzy pubescence. Flowers form in pale yellow-green inflorescences. The fruit is a reddish three-winged samara.

== Gallery ==
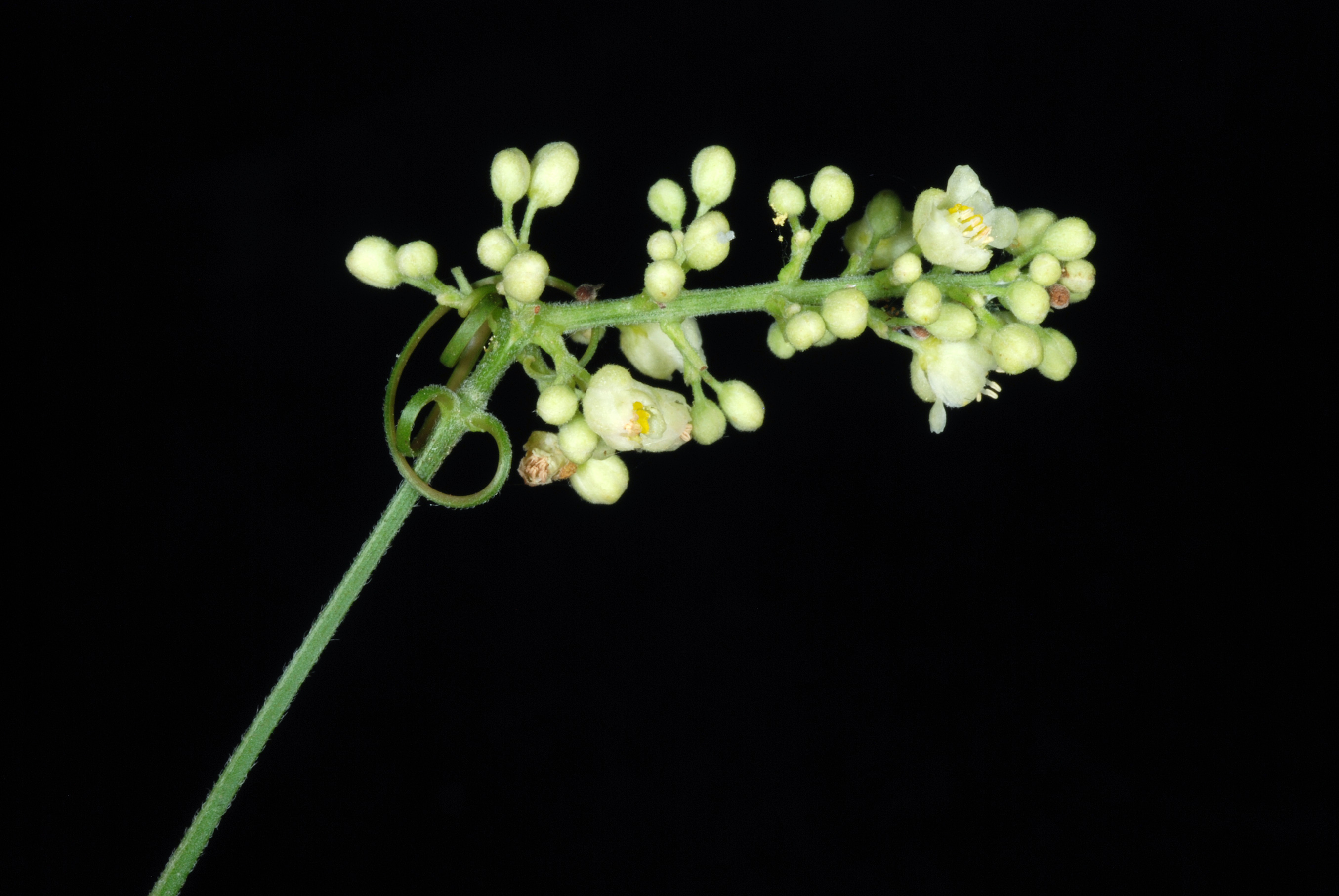
Close up of an inflorescence

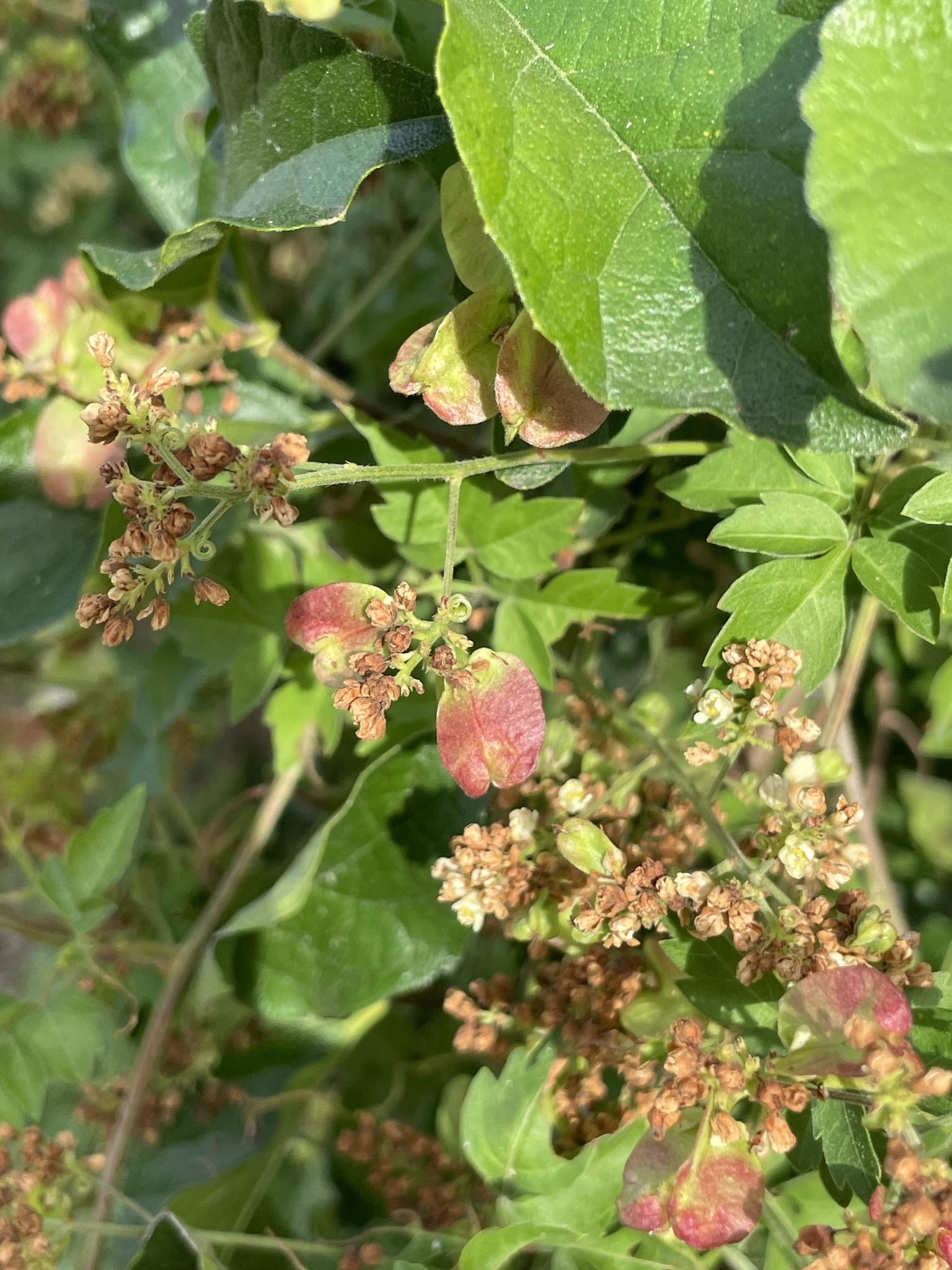
Dried flowers and seed pods
