= Cook Inlet Basin =

Coordinates: 59.7360°N 152.3844°W

The Cook Inlet Basin is a northeast-trending collisional forearc basin that stretches from the Gulf of Alaska into South central Alaska, just east of the Matanuska Valley. It is located in the arc-trench gap between the Alaska-Aleutian Range batholith and contains roughly 80,000 cubic miles of sedimentary rocks. These sediments are mainly derived from Triassic, Jurassic and Cretaceous sediments.

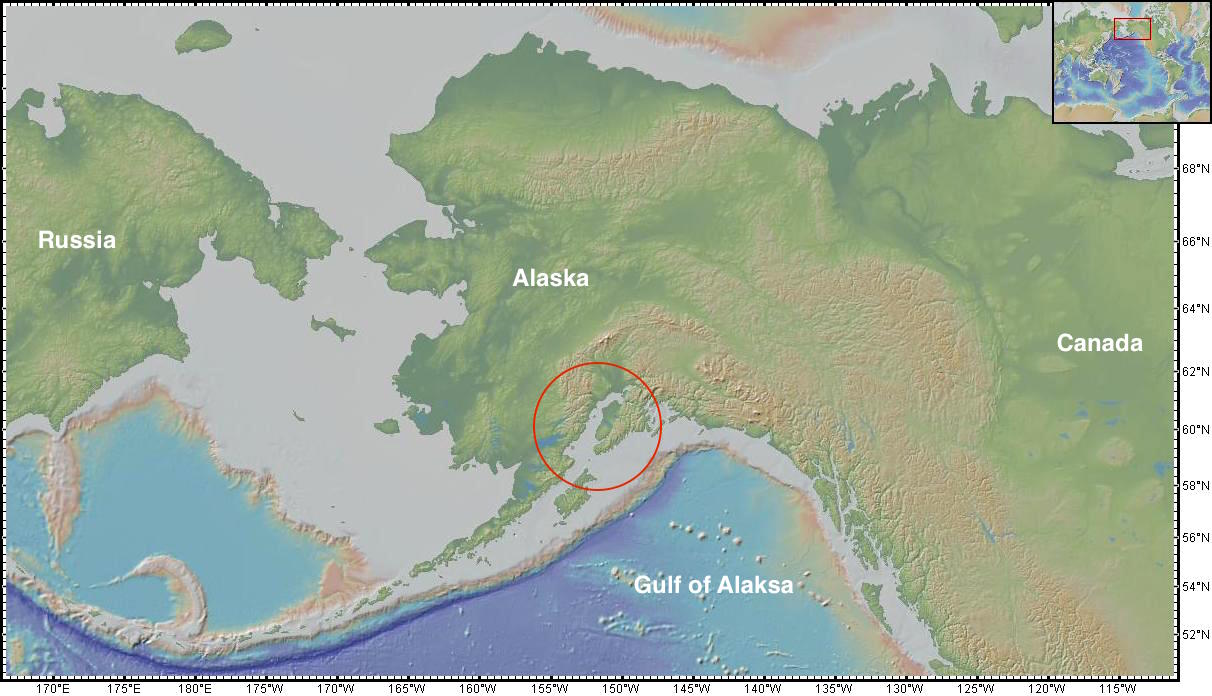
The Cook Inlet Basin

The region is heavily influenced by two major tectonic elements which are still active in the area today. The western side of the basin lies directly above the Aleutian subduction zone where the Pacific Plate is subducting beneath the North American Plate. However the eastern side of the basin overlays the subduction of the Yakutat microplate beneath the North American plate. Active subduction along various sides of the basin produce regional compression that lead to major folding, faulting and the formation of anticline structures within the sediments. Anticline structures provide ideal hydrocarbon traps, and so the Cook Inlet Basin is widely known for its hydrocarbon accumulations and its overall production of oil and gas.

== Regional tectonism ==
The geology of Alaska is characterized by the collision and accretion of terranes over the last 100 Ma and its features formed as a response to plate convergence and subduction.

=== Pacific Plate megathrust ===
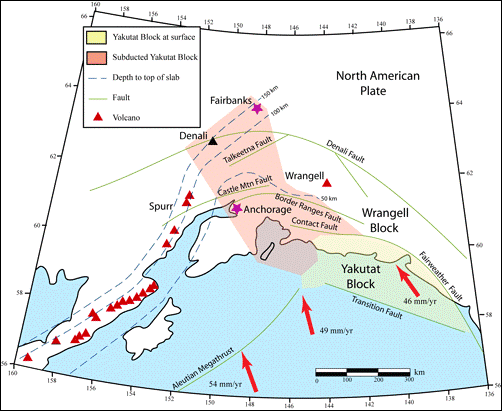
This Image shows where the Yakutat microplate is subducting beneath the North American Plate. Red indicates the region where the microplate has already been subducted, while the yellow indicates where it is still present at the surface.

Alaskan tectonism is mainly dominated by the subduction of the Pacific Plate beneath the North American Plate. The subduction boundary is marked by a 4,000 km long trench known as the Aleutian Trench, where seismic activity is common and the volcanic arc produced is part of the Pacific Ring of Fire. The initial subduction of the Pacific Plate triggered the formation of the Bruin Bay Fault system, which is responsible for northeast trending faults throughout the western portion of the Cook Inlet Basin. Thrust type shearing is present along this active margin and it causes the sediments to form anticline structures as a response to regional compression.

=== Yakutat Microplate ===
The collision of the Yakutat microplate and the Alaskan superterrane is believed to have happened sometime during the Miocene epoch, after the subduction of the Pacific Plate had already begun. The Yakutat microplate is characterized by a basement of oceanic crust overlain by continental crust. Throughout the basin, Tertiary non-marine stratigraphy have been deformed into northeast-trending, discontinuous folds which partially extend into Mesozoic strata. The ongoing collision is causing the forarc region to collapse into itself, similar to the way a zipper collapses into itself when being zipped shut. This collision is also causing the buildup of an accretionary prism known as the Kenai Mountains, which borders the southeast region of the Cook Inlet basin.

=== Structural cross section ===
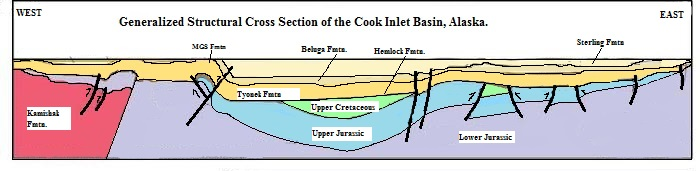
Generalized Cross section of the foreland basin of the Cook Inlet Basin, Alaska

== Major faults ==
=== Bruin bay Fault System ===
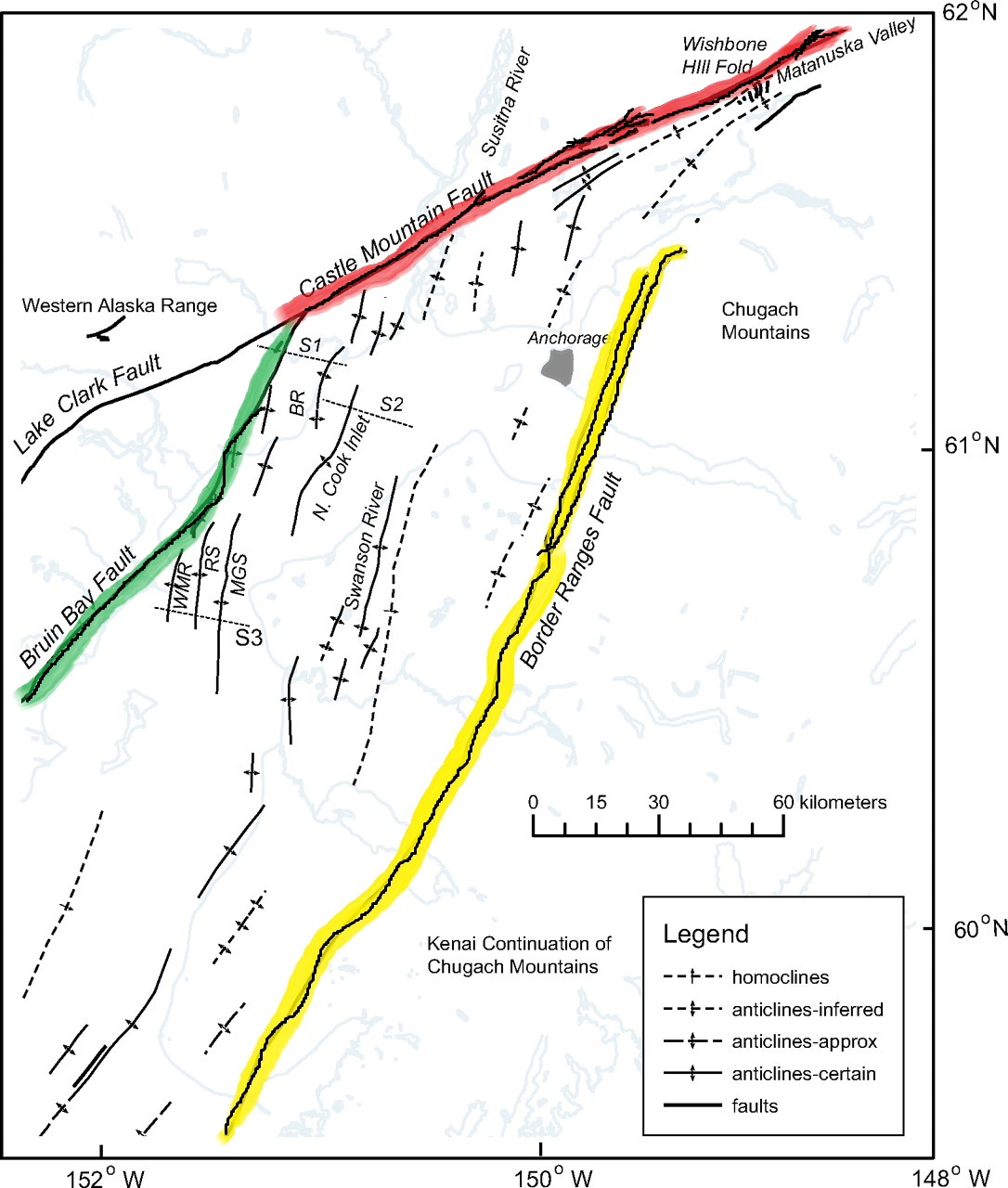
Cook Inlet Major Fault Systems, Modified After Bruhn et al. 2006

The Bruin Bay fault system is system of steeply dipping, northeast-striking faults which extend roughly 498 km along the western region of the basin. It extends from the south of Becharof Lake on the Alaskan Peninsula up to its termination point against the Castle-Mountain Lake fault system. The system separates Mesozoic and Cenozoic volcanic sediments and Upper Triassic and Lower Jurassic volcanic rocks of the arc from Mesozoic marine and non-marine strata within the forearc basin. Faults within the system are generally high angle and westward dipping, but due to the accumulation of sediments on the surface over time, the Burin Bay Fault system is present predominantly within the subsurface. The fault system was believed to have been active during Naknek deposition, and intrusive volcanic plutons indicate fault activity occurring before the Oligocene epoch.

=== Border Ranges Fault System ===
The Border Ranges Fault system is a normal-oblique fault and stretches 1,500 mi on the eastern side of the basin. It separates the forearc basin from the subduction complex as well as deformed metamorphic rocks from the subduction complex. The Fault system originated during the pre-miocene period as a result of megathrust subduction and it was subsequently filled with turbidity deposits. Since then, it underwent contractional deformation in the Cretaceous and Paleocene-Eocene due to strike-slip movements.

=== Castle Mountain Fault System ===
This system of northeast striking faults extends roughly 200 km long and is the only fault in the region with Holocene faulting present at the surface. Motion along this fault dates as far back as 47 Million years ago and was supposedly active during the Jurassic Period, where it experienced right lateral strike-slip motion. It is still partially active today.

== Stratigraphy ==
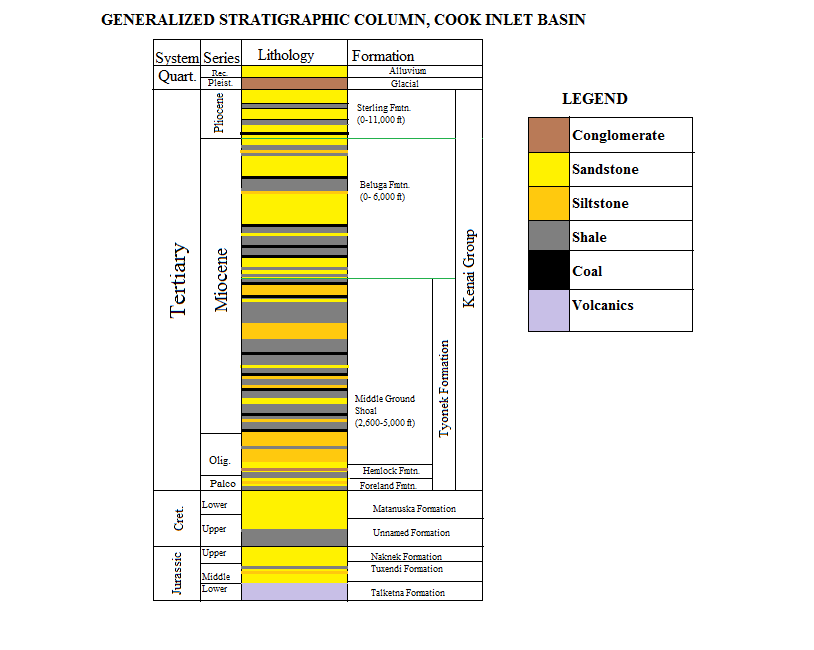
Generalized Stratigraphic Column of the Cook Inlet Basin, Alaska

- Tuxendi Formation
  - Siltstone, clay-rich, some organic material
- Hemlock Formation
  - Sandstone, conglomerate sandstone, conglomerates
- Tyonek Formation
  - Massively bedded sandstones with siltstone and coal
- West Foreland Formation
  - Conglomerates, sandstone, siltstone
- Sterling Formation
  - Generally massively stacked fluvial channels, massive sandstone/conglomerate interbedded mudstones, siltstones and thin coals
- Beluga Formation
  - Siltstone with fluvial sandstone, thin layers of discontinuous coal, volcanic tuffs

== Depositional history ==
=== Late Triassic and Early Jurassic (237 Ma–174 Ma) ===
The Upper Triassic lithology, known as the Kamishak Formation, and the Lower Jurassic lithology, known as the Talkeetna Formation, are both part of an oceanic island arc. These formations are present along the East-West margin of the Bruin Bay Fault zone and are intruded by igneous plutons originating from dehydration melt produced by Pacific Plate subduction. The Kamishak Formation is reflective of a shallow reef environment that graded into deeper marine sediments that were deposited during a transgressive ocean sequence. During the late Triassic, the pacific plate was subducting beneath the North American Plate causing plutons, dikes and sills to intrude into the country rock, especially near the Burin Bay Fault zone. Triassic sediments within the Kamishak sit atop a 7775 ft layer of Permian volcanic rocks.

The Jurassic Talkeetna formation sits unconformably on top of the Kamishak formation, although some disconformities are seen throughout the peninsula. The Talkeetna is composed mostly of volcanic material interbedded with characteristic lava flows and tuffs. Geochemical analysis of the lava flows indicate the formation was once at great depths within the ocean. The formation records periods of shallow, intermediate and deep crustal levels originating in an oceanic island arc environment.

=== Middle and Upper Jurassic (174 Ma–145 Ma) ===
During the middle to late Jurassic, an amalgamated superterrane of Tertiary, Quaternary and Mesozoic sediments collided into the continental margin of Alaska. The collision caused the shallow crust to be uplifted and eroded causing the exposure of igneous dike intrusions. The stratigraphy of this time period records the synorogenic sedimentation of marine Jurassic and Cretaceous sandstone, shale and limestone. Three major unconformities are present, the lower Tuxendi Group, the upper Tuxedni Group and the Naknek Formation.

==== The lower Texendi Group ====
The Lower Tuxendi Group is composed of deep water marine sediments that indicate two instances of a transgressive and regressive oceanic sequences. Between each sequence the grading of the sediments reflect a deltaic environment.

==== Upper Tuxedni Group ====
The Upper Tuxendi Group is comparable to the lower Tuxendi Group in that it reflects a marine environment consistent with deltaic facies. There are also interbedded deposits of shale, siltstone, sandstone and conglomerates. However, this marine sequence is not see throughout the group. Nonmarine debris flows are also present but they eventually grade into sandy marine deposits that reflect a high energy marine environment.

==== Naknek Formation ====
The Naknek Formation is a notably thick stratigraphic unit(up to 10,000 ft), but its thickness is non uniform throughout the Alaskan Peninsula. The lithologies display dramatic facies changes from large sediments (cobbles, boulders) to bioturbated sandstones which contain an abundant amount of fossils.

== Major faults ==
=== Bruin Bay Fault System ===
The Bruin Bay fault system is system of steeply dipping, northeast-striking faults which extend roughly 498 km along the western region of the basin. It extends from the south of Becharof Lake on the Alaskan Peninsula up to its termination point against the Castle-Mountain Lake fault system. The system separates Mesozoic and Cenozoic volcanic sediments and Upper Triassic and Lower Jurassic volcanic rocks of the arc from Mesozoic marine and non-marine strata within the forearc basin . Faults within the system are generally high angle and westward dipping, but due to the accumulation of sediments on the surface over time, the Burin Bay Fault system is present predominantly within the subsurface. The fault system was believed to have been active during Naknek deposition, and intrusive volcanic plutons indicate fault activity occurring before the Oligocene epoch.

=== Tertiary (65 Ma–2 Ma) ===
==== West Foreland Formation ====
The sediments within the West Foreland Formation are mainly derived from eroded Mesozoic and early Tertiary Rocks. They were deposited by streams and currents carry sediments in a shallow estuarine environment. Additionally, there are interbedded layers of siltstone, sandstone, conglomerates and coal beds.

===== Hemlock Formation =====
The Hemlock Formation is roughly 600 feet thick and dominated by conglomerate deposits which are consistent with a fluvial-deltaic type of environment. This is a major oil producing reservoir and has produced over 315,000,000 barrels of oil.

==== Sterling Formation ====
In the Sterling Formation, there is roughly 10,000 ft of thick sandstone that was deposited in the central and eastern regions of the Cook Inlet Basin during the late Tertiary-early Quaternary period. Regional uplift was occurring during this time, and major sediment sources were derived from the Chugach range and the Alaskan Range. The lower Sterling sandstone's are major gas reservoirs and have produced over 330 billion cubic feet of gas.

==== Beluga Formation ====
The Beluga Formation is marked by alternating layers of sand, silt and coal followed by thick sandstone deposits. The sediment source was mainly from channel-sand deposits coming from the North. However, the uplift and erosion of the Chugach range provided the conglomerate sediments to the basin. Over 56 billion cubic feet of gas has been produced here.

== Oil and gas production ==
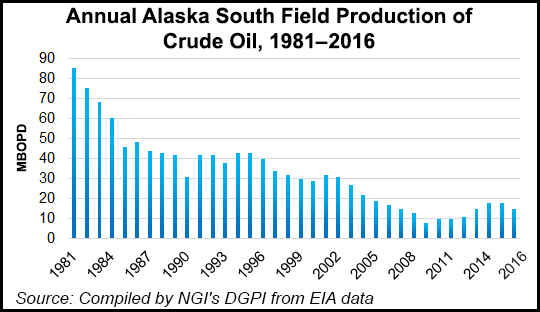
Annual Alaska South Field production of crude Oil

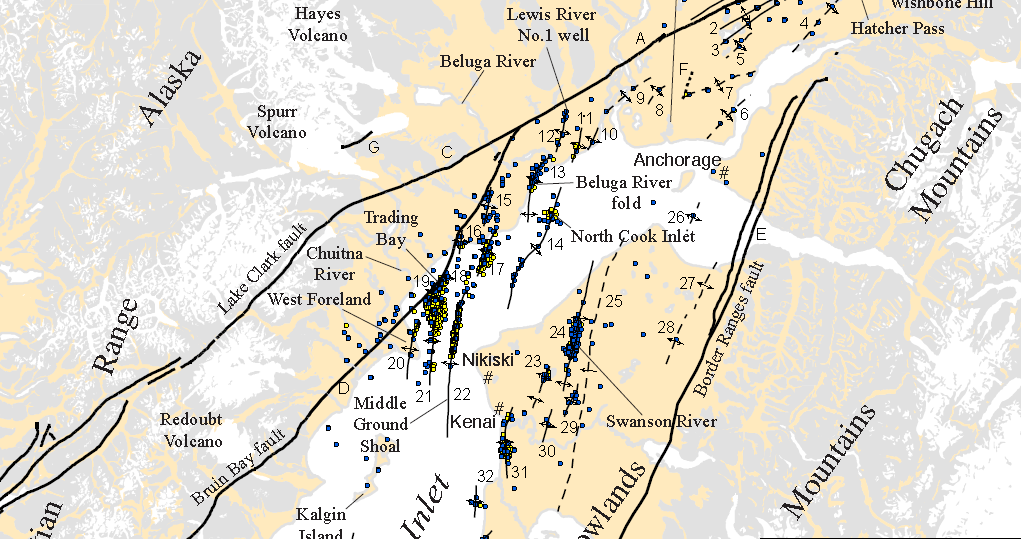
Cook Inlet Oil Fields

The Cook Inlet Basin is a major hydrocarbon bearing province that was first discovered in the 1950s. The discovery of oil and gas extends from the Kachemak Bay area north to the mouth of the Susitna River, covering an area of nearly 5,000 square miles.

=== Middle Ground Shoal (MGS) Oil Field ===
The Middle Ground Shoal (MGS) oil field was discovered in the upper Cook Inlet in July 1962 with the Shell MGS State No. 1 well, and is considered one of the largest, tightest anticline folds in the Cook Inlet Basin. The field produces oil mainly out of the Tertiary Tyonek Formation, Kenai Group, from a gross interval of 2,800 ft, between depths of 5,100 and 9,700 ft. Additionally, the field contains 31 producing wells, 23 injection wells, 1 shut-in gas well and 8 abandoned wells. As of April, 2022, the MGS produced nearly 204,871,000 barrels of oil.

== See also ==
- Cook Inlet
- Kenai Peninsula
