= Serjania ichthyctona =

Scientific classification
- Kingdom: Plantae
- Clade: Tracheophytes
- Clade: Angiosperms
- Clade: Eudicots
- Clade: Rosids
- Order: Sapindales
- Family: Sapindaceae
- Genus: Serjania
- Species: S. ichthyctona

Binomial name
- Serjania ichthyctona Radlk.

Species of flowering plant

Serjania ichthyctona is a rainforest liana belonging to the soapberry family (Sapindaceae). According to Eames and MacDaniels, this liana's shoots divide into two or more strands like a multistranded rope, making it more flexible and resistant to breakage.
