= Serjania brevipes =

Conservation status
- Endangered (IUCN 3.1)

Scientific classification
- Kingdom: Plantae
- Clade: Tracheophytes
- Clade: Angiosperms
- Clade: Eudicots
- Clade: Rosids
- Order: Sapindales
- Family: Sapindaceae
- Genus: Serjania
- Species: S. brevipes

Binomial name
- Serjania brevipes Benth.

Species of flowering plant

Serjania brevipes is a species of plant in the family Sapindaceae. It is endemic to Ecuador.
