= Serjania pteleifolia =

Conservation status
- Data Deficient (IUCN 3.1)

Scientific classification
- Kingdom: Plantae
- Clade: Tracheophytes
- Clade: Angiosperms
- Clade: Eudicots
- Clade: Rosids
- Order: Sapindales
- Family: Sapindaceae
- Genus: Serjania
- Species: S. pteleifolia

Binomial name
- Serjania pteleifolia Diels

Species of flowering plant

Serjania pteleifolia is a species of plant in the family Sapindaceae. It is endemic to Ecuador.
