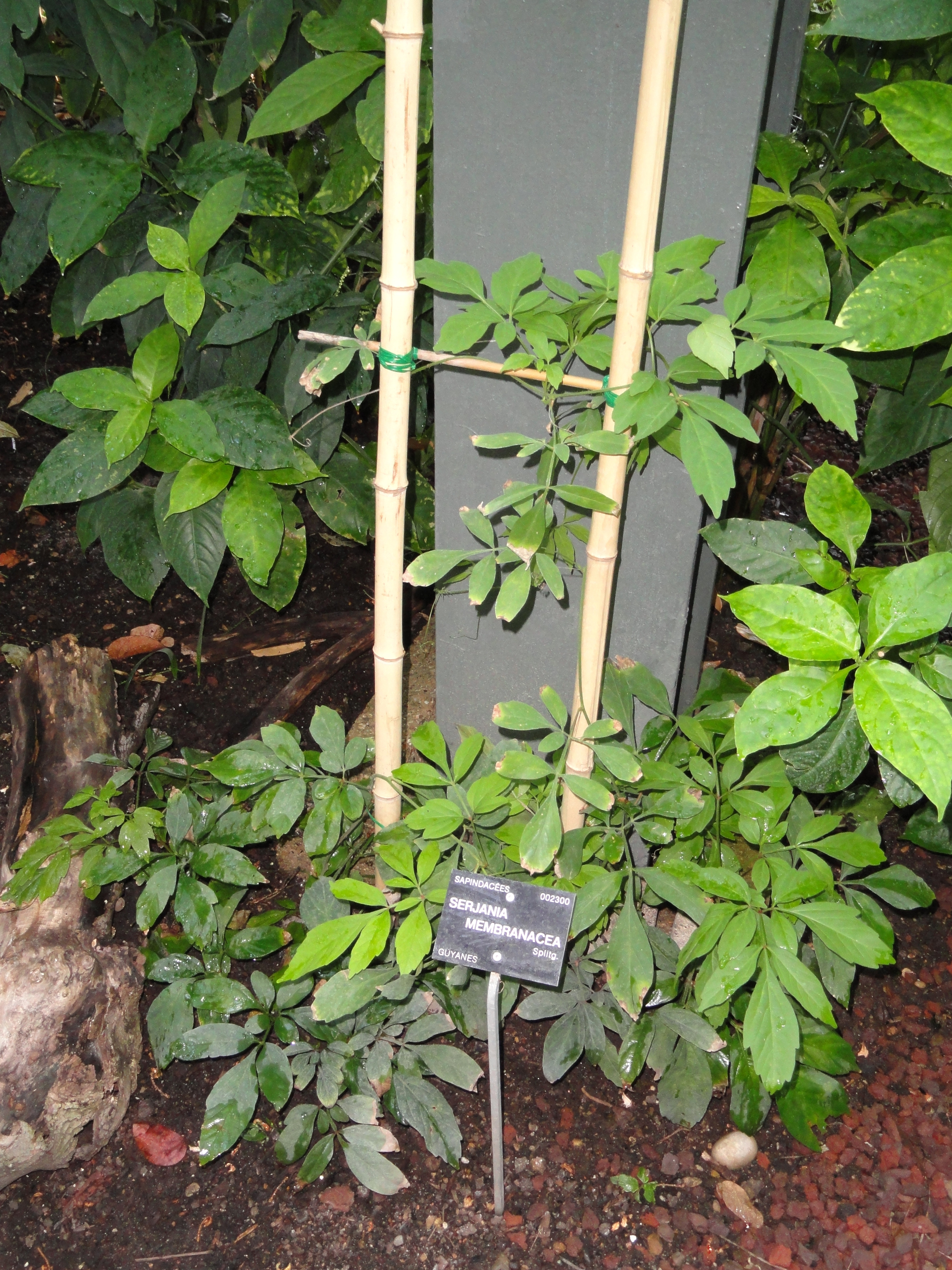
- Serjania membranacea

Scientific classification
- Kingdom: Plantae
- Clade: Tracheophytes
- Clade: Angiosperms
- Clade: Eudicots
- Clade: Rosids
- Order: Sapindales
- Family: Sapindaceae
- Subfamily: Sapindoideae
- Genus: Serjania; Mill.

Diversity
- c. 250 species

Synonyms
- Balsas J.Jiménez Ram. & K.Vega; Chimborazoa H.T.Beck; Houssayanthus Hunz.

= Serjania =

Genus of flowering plants

Serjania is a genus of flowering plants in the soapberry family, Sapindaceae. The name honours French Minim friar Philippe Sergeant. Species are native to the Americas.

== Selected species ==
- Serjania brevipes Benth. (Ecuador)
- Serjania ichthyctona Radlk.
- Serjania pteleifolia Diels (Ecuador)

=== Formerly placed here ===
- Paullinia cururu L. (as S. cururu (L.) Druce)
