= Kenai Group =

Cenozoic geologic unit in Alaska

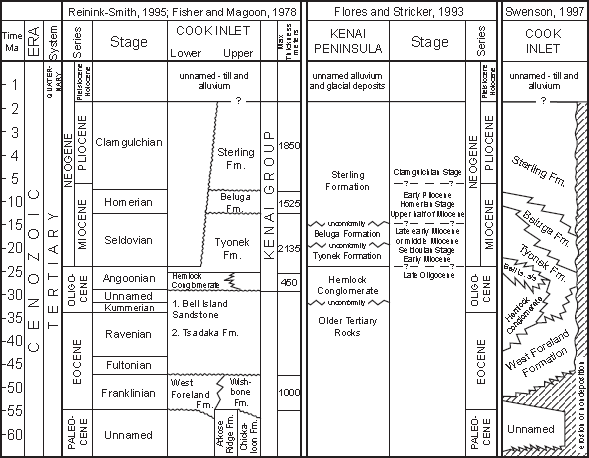
Cook Inlet stratigraphic column

Kenai Group is a name given by Dall and Harris (1892) to sedimentary rocks in the Cook Inlet Basin, Alaska. These rocks are instead called the Kenai Formation by several other authors.

== See also ==
- Kenai Peninsula
