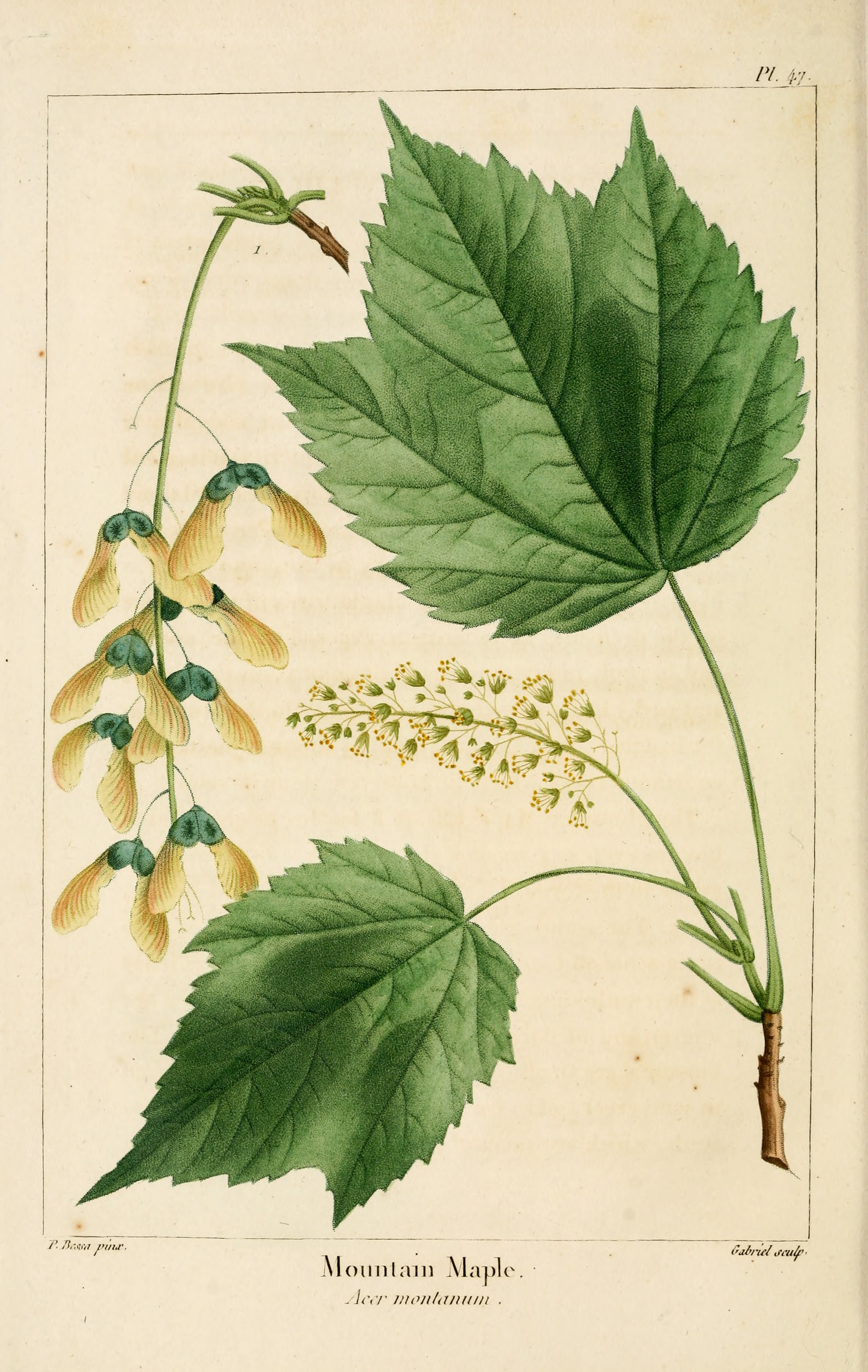
- 1819 illustration

Conservation status
- Least Concern (IUCN 3.1)

Scientific classification
- Kingdom: Plantae
- Clade: Tracheophytes
- Clade: Angiosperms
- Clade: Eudicots
- Clade: Rosids
- Order: Sapindales
- Family: Sapindaceae
- Genus: Acer
- Section: Acer sect. Spicata
- Species: A. spicatum

Binomial name
- Acer spicatum Lam. 1786
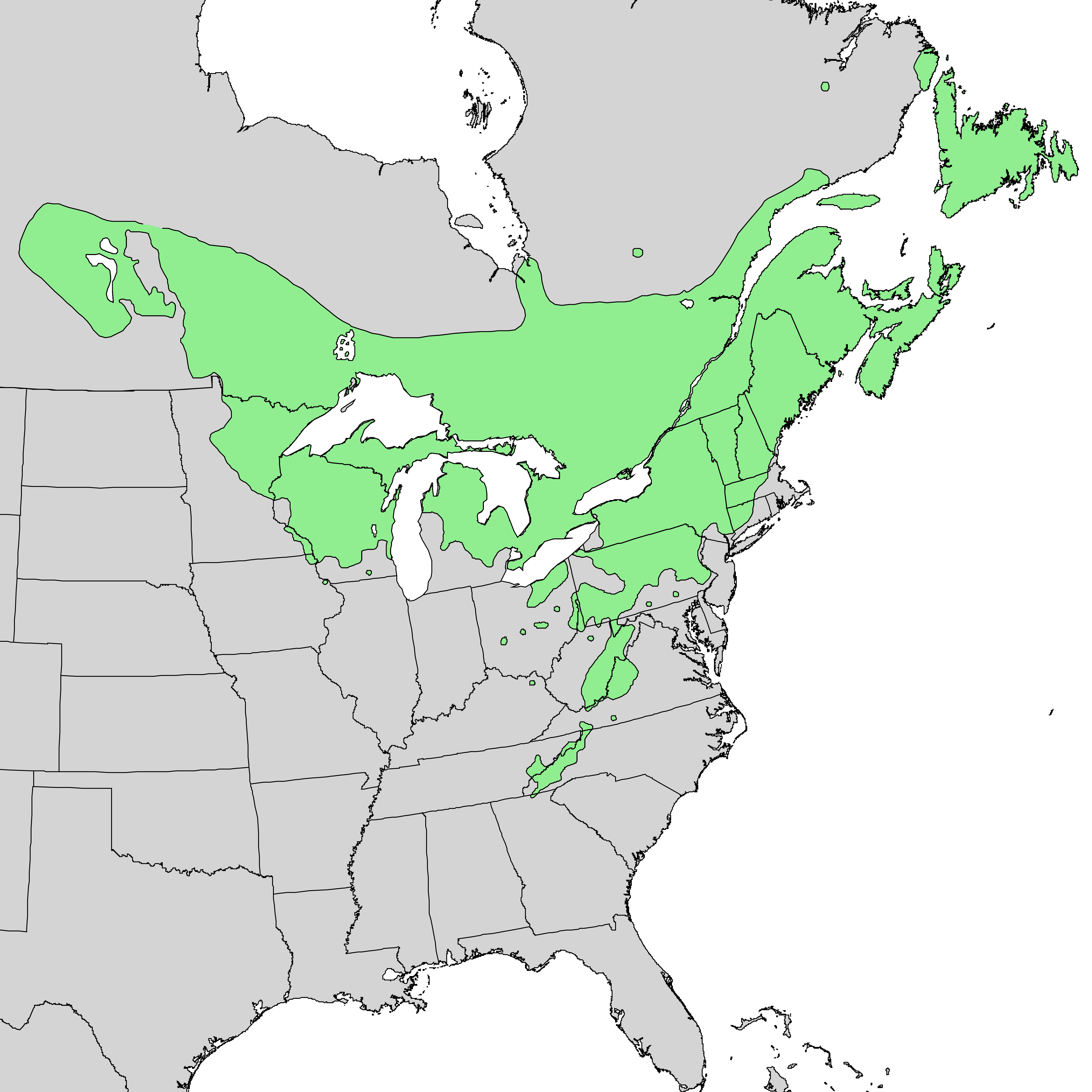
- Generalized natural range

Synonyms
- List: Acer dedyle Maxim.; Acer montanum W.T.Aiton; Acer parviflorum Ehrh.; Acer pumilum W.Bartram; Acer striatum Du Roi

= Acer spicatum =

Species of maple

Acer spicatum, the mountain maple, dwarf maple, moose maple, or white maple, is a species of maple native to northeastern North America from Saskatchewan to Newfoundland, and south to Pennsylvania. It also grows at high elevations in the southern Appalachian Mountains to northern Georgia.

== Description ==
Acer spicatum is a deciduous shrub or small tree growing to 3–8 m (10–25 ft) tall, forming a spreading crown with a short trunk and slender branches. The leaves are opposite and simple, 6–10 cm (2 1/4–4 in) long and wide, with 3 or 5 shallow broad lobes. They are coarsely and irregularly toothed with a light green hairless surface and a finely hairy underside. The leaves turn brilliant yellow to red in autumn, and are on slender stalks usually longer than the blade. The bark is thin, dull gray-brown, and smooth at first but becoming slightly scaly. The fruit is a paired reddish samara, 2–3 cm (3/4–1 1/4 in) long, maturing in late summer to early autumn.

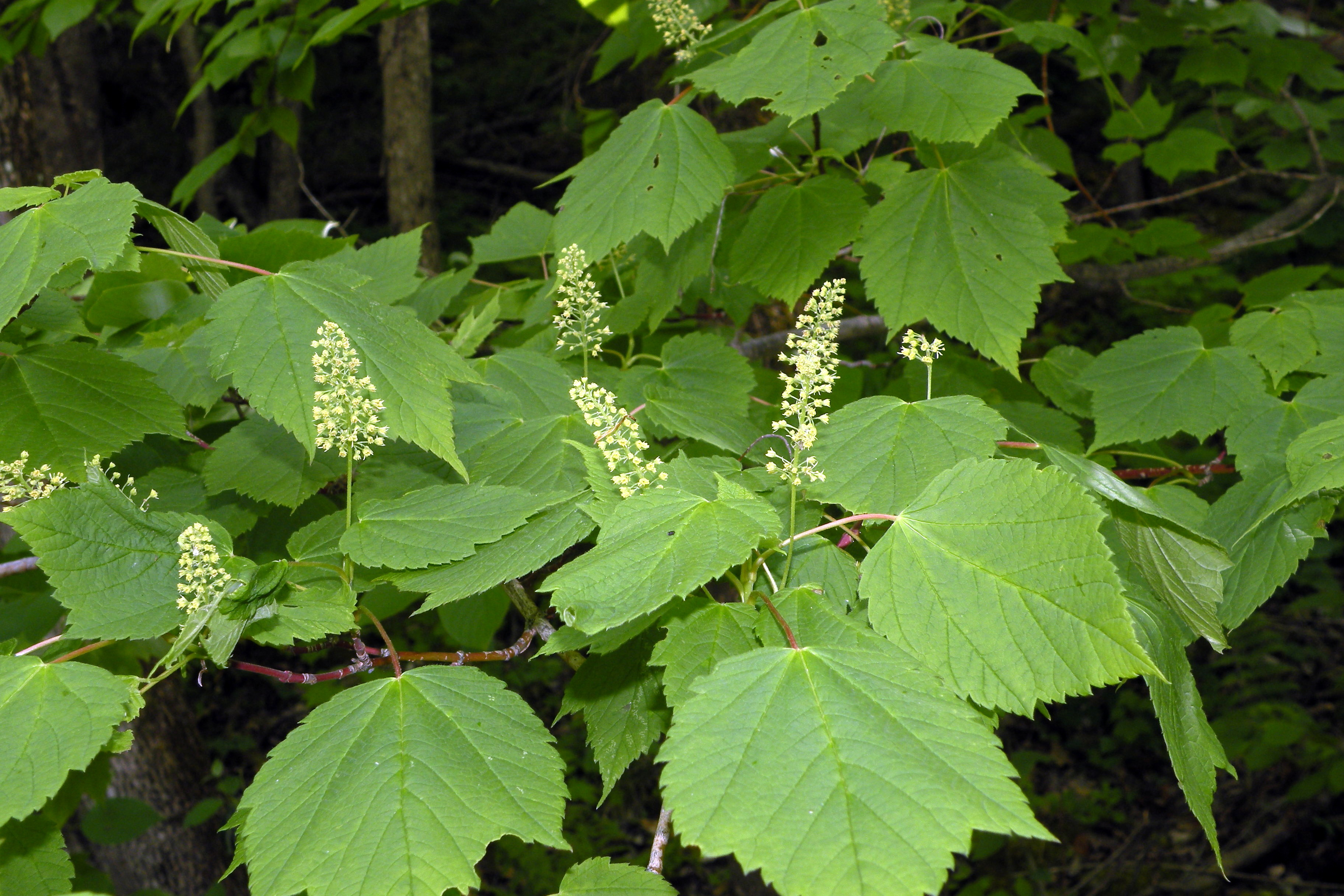
Flowering tree in Willsboro, New York

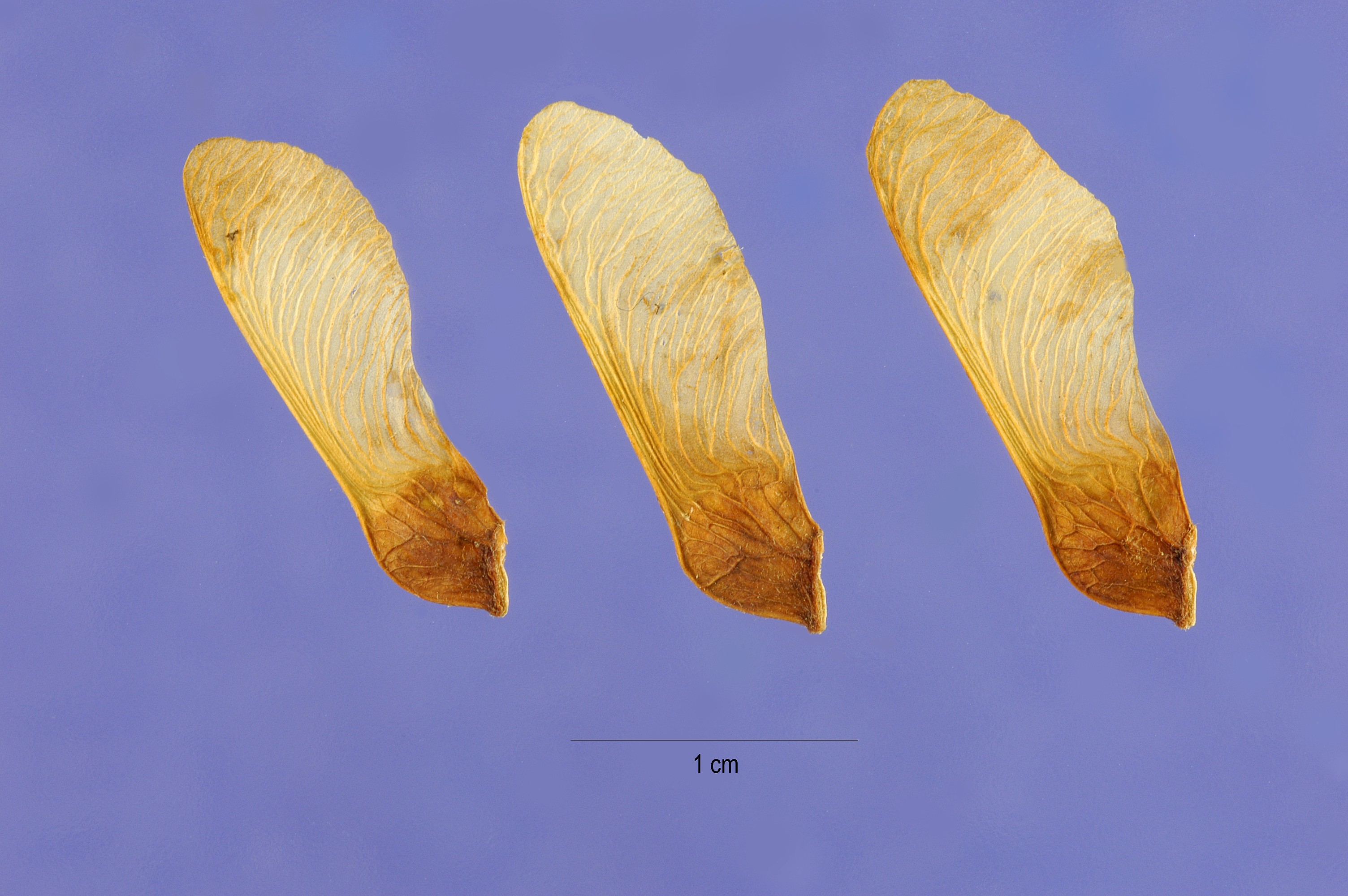
Fruits (samaras) with measurement for scale

== Distribution and ecology ==
The tree lives in moist woods in rich, well-drained soils on rocky hillsides and along streams. It also grows on ravines, cliff faces, and forested bogs. It colonizes the understory of hardwood forests.

Mammals such as moose, deer, beavers, and rabbits browse the bark; ruffed grouse eat the buds.

== Uses ==
The sap is a source of sugar and can be boiled to make maple syrup. The bark contains tannins, which are used in tanning leather. Indigenous peoples infused the piths of young twigs to produce treatments for eye irritation and made poultices from boiled root chips. It is also said to be used to relieve stress in humans. The wood has been a popular choice for making musical instruments because of its high strength and durability.
