= Olallie Lake =

Olallie Lake may refer to:

- Olallie Scenic Area which contains Olallie Lake, in Oregon
  - Olallie Lake Guard Station within the Olallie Scenic Area
- Olallie Lake in Skamania County, Washington
- Olallie Lake in the Alpine Lakes Wilderness in Washington
