= National Register of Historic Places listings in Jefferson County, Oregon =

Location of Jefferson County in Oregon

This list presents the full set of buildings, structures, objects, sites, or districts designated on the National Register of Historic Places in Jefferson County, Oregon, United States, and offers brief descriptive information about each of them. The National Register recognizes places of national, state, or local historic significance across the United States. Out of over 90,000 National Register sites nationwide, Oregon is home to over 2,000, and 9 of those are found partially or wholly in Jefferson County.

This National Park Service list is complete through NPS recent listings posted September 18, 2026.

== Current listings ==
	Name on the Register	Image	Date listed	Location	City or town	Description
1	Camp Sherman Community Hall	Camp Sherman Community Hall	February 28, 2003 (#03000070)	13025 SW Camp Sherman Road; 44°27′01″N 121°39′14″W	Camp Sherman	
2	Enoch and Mary Cyrus Homestead	Enoch and Mary Cyrus Homestead	May 26, 2015 (#15000270)	Hagman Road; 44°26′52″N 121°06′11″W	Culver vicinity	
3	Jefferson County Courthouse	Jefferson County Courthouse	September 17, 2015 (#15000614)	34 SE D Street; 44°38′02″N 121°07′44″W	Madras	
4	Max and Ollie Lueddemann House	Max and Ollie Lueddemann House	June 3, 1996 (#96000620)	96 SE 9th Street; 44°38′06″N 121°07′33″W	Madras	Completed in 1906, this bungalow is one of very few near-unaltered houses remaining from Madras's earliest years. It was the home of newspaper publisher and civic booster Max Lueddemann until 1909. Despite his short tenure in the young town, Lueddemann gained respect as a journalist, business leader, and real estate promoter.
5	Madras Army Air Field North Hangar	Madras Army Air Field North Hangar	June 8, 2015 (#15000331)	2028 NW Berg Drive; 44°39′57″N 121°08′57″W	Madras	
6	Julius and Sarah McCoin Homestead	Julius and Sarah McCoin Homestead	May 26, 2015 (#15000271)	Forest Service Road 57; 44°25′44″N 121°05′21″W	Culver vicinity	
7	Olallie Lake Guard Station	Olallie Lake Guard Station	March 6, 1991 (#91000169)	South of Pinhead Buttes, Mount Hood National Forest; 44°48′51″N 121°47′25″W	Estacada vicinity	
8	Oregon Pacific Railroad Linear Historic District	Oregon Pacific Railroad Linear Historic District	October 29, 1999 (#99001285)	Roughly a 20-mile linear section of the old railroad grade between Idanha and the Cascade Range summit (See also Marion and Linn counties.); 44°27′10″N 121°53′57″W	Idanha to the Cascade Range summit via Santiam Junction	Beginning in 1872, the colorful Thomas Egenton Hogg set out to build a transcontinental railroad terminating in the Oregon Coast. By the time of his venture's final bankruptcy in 1894, completed track reached only from Yaquina Bay to Idanha in the Cascade foothills, with grade work under way east of Idanha to the summit. The historic district protects the remaining signs of the grade work east of Idanha, as well as the sites of two construction camps. Abandoned part way through construction, these remnants provide a unique window onto construction methods and living conditions in 19th century railroad camps.
9	Oregon Trunk Passenger and Freight Station	Oregon Trunk Passenger and Freight Station	February 27, 1986 (#86000285)	Washington Street at the foot of 6th Street; 44°35′15″N 121°10′39″W	Metolius	

== See also ==
- National Register of Historic Places listings in Oregon
- Listings in neighboring counties: Crook, Deschutes, Linn, Marion, Wasco, Wheeler
- Historic preservation
- History of Oregon
- Lists of Oregon-related topics
