= Horse Heaven =

Horse Heaven may refer to:

- Horse Heaven, Oregon, a ghost town in Jefferson County, Oregon, US
- Horse Heaven, Washington, an unincorporated community in Benton County, Washington State, US
- Horse Heaven (conservation area), a conservation area in western Virginia, US
- Horse Heaven Hills, a range of hills in Klickitat, Yakima, and Benton counties in Washington State, US
- Horse Heaven, a novel by Jane Smiley

== See also ==
- Horse Haven, California
