= Olallie Lake Guard Station =

- U.S. National Register of Historic Places
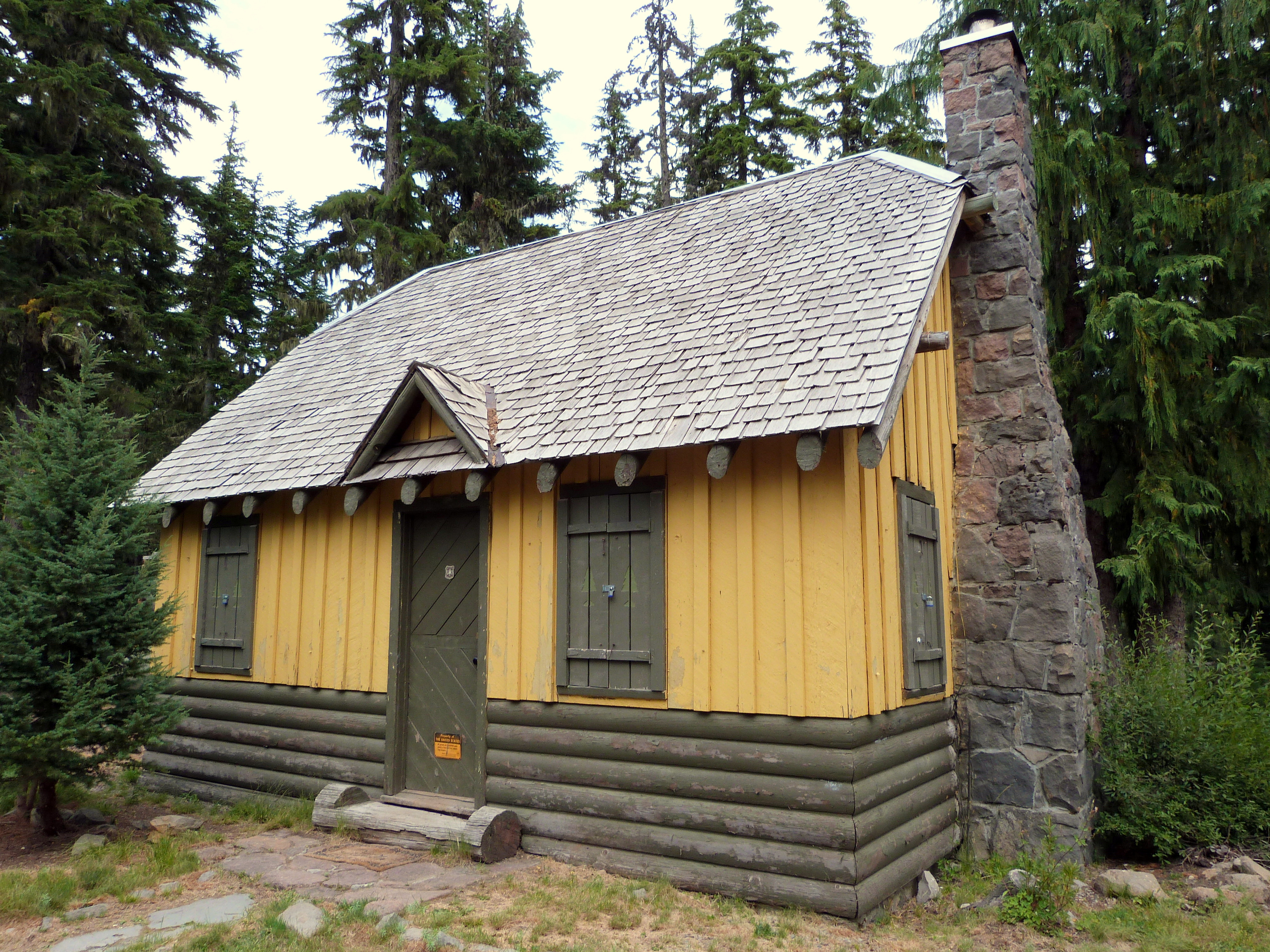
- The Olallie Lake Guard Station in 2013

- Location within Oregon Location within the United States
- Location: Mount Hood National Forest
- Nearest city: Estacada, Oregon
- Coordinates: 44°48′51″N 121°47′25″W
- Area: 0.92 acres (0.37 ha)
- Built: 1939
- Built by: Civilian Conservation Corps
- Architect: Multiple
- Architectural style: Rustic
- MPS: USDA Forest Service Administrative Buildings in Oregon and Washington Built by the CCC MPS
- NRHP reference No.: 91000169
- Added to NRHP: March 6, 1991

Olallie Lake Guard Station is a former guard station in the Clackamas ranger district of the Mt. Hood National Forest, in Jefferson County, Oregon. Built in 1939, the cabin is in the Olallie Scenic Area near Olallie Butte and Mount Jefferson in the Cascade Mountains. It was listed on the National Register of Historic Places in 1991.

Its NRHP nomination explains its significance:

Possessing very high qualities of design and execution, the Guard Station is a very good example of an architectural locution invested with special aesthetic and associative values by the agency that created it.

== See also ==
- National Register of Historic Places listings in Jefferson County, Oregon
