= Trout Creek (Deschutes River tributary) =

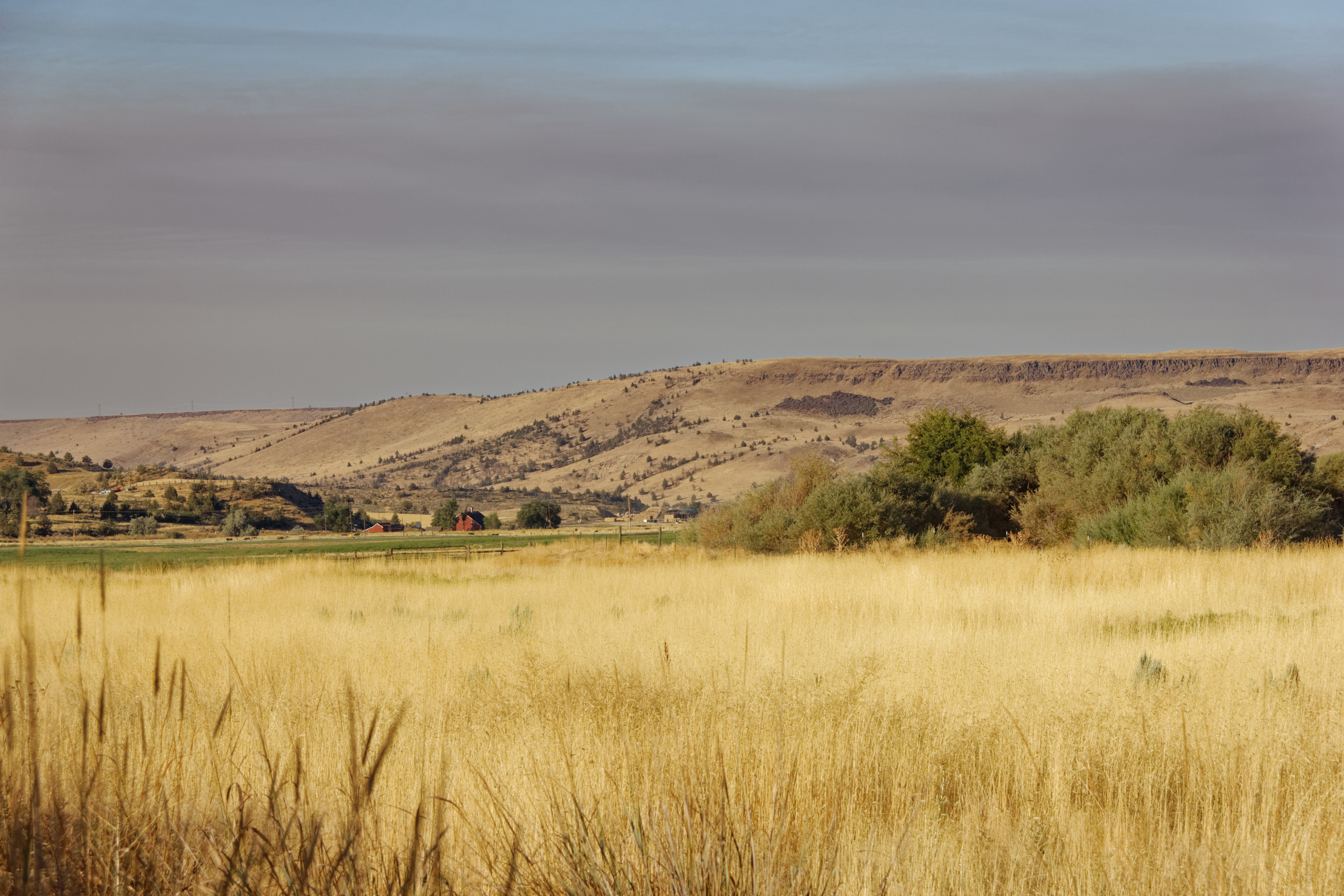
- Trout Creek valley near the mouth of Antelope Creek

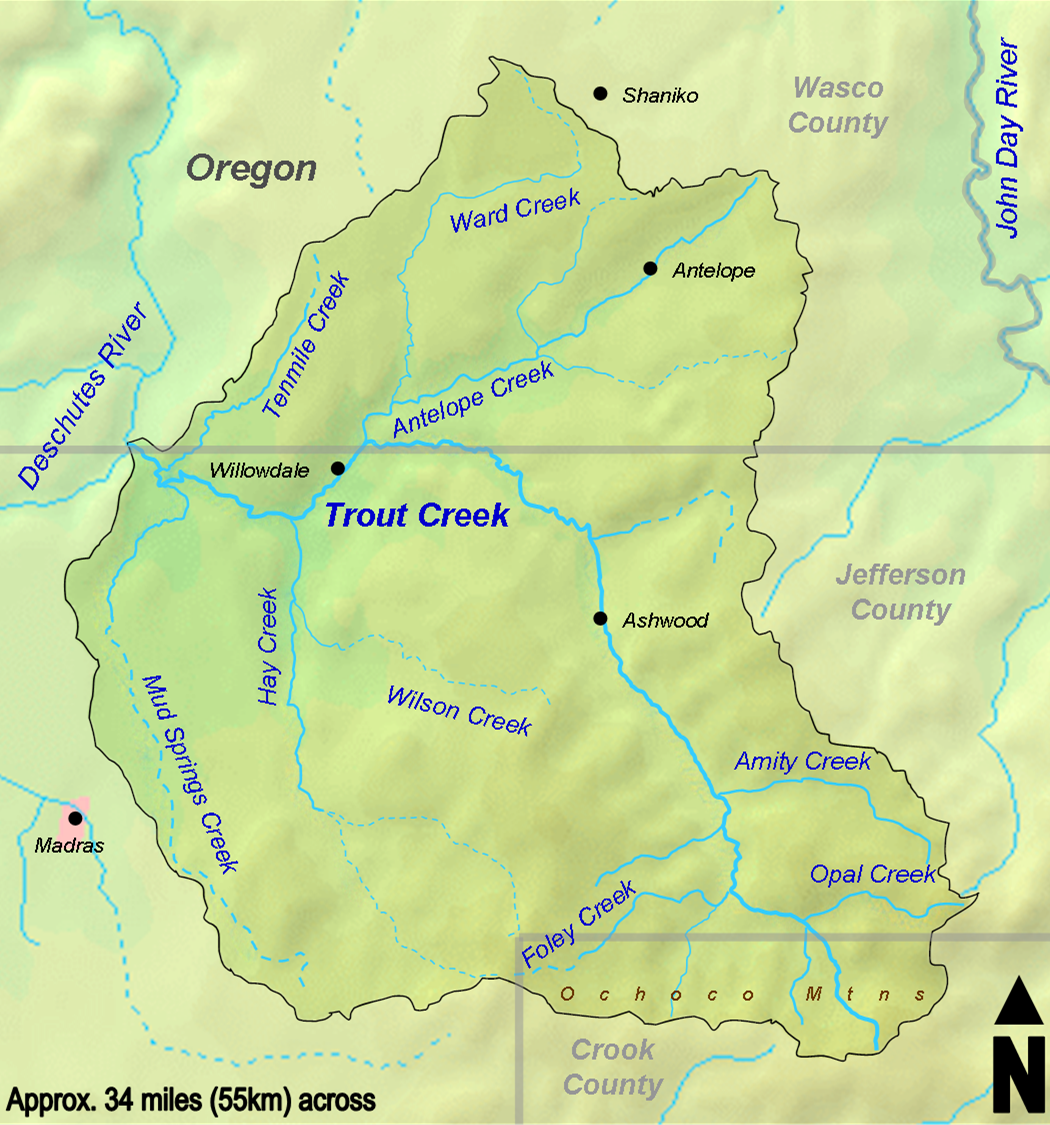
- Trout Creek watershed

- Location of the mouth of Trout Creek in Oregon

Location
- Country: United States
- State: Oregon
- Counties: Crook, Jefferson, and Wasco

Physical characteristics
- Source: Ochoco Mountains
  - location: northeast of Prineville, Crook County, Oregon
  - coordinates: 44°30′42″N 120°33′20″W
  - elevation: 5,593 ft (1,705 m)
- Mouth: Deschutes River
  - location: at the Jefferson/Wasco county line, Oregon
  - coordinates: 44°49′17″N 121°05′19″W
  - elevation: 1,283 ft (391 m)
- Length: 51 mi (82 km)
- Basin size: 692 sq mi (1,790 km^{2})

Trout Creek is a 51-mile (82 km) long tributary of the Deschutes River in the U.S. state of Oregon. It drains approximately 692 square miles (1,792 km^{2}) of Crook, Jefferson, and Wasco counties. Arising in the Ochoco Mountains, it flows north and then west to its confluence with the Deschutes River.

== Course ==
Trout Creek's headwaters are in the western Ochoco Mountains, northeast of Prineville. It flows north, gathering minor tributaries such as Auger Creek and Amity Creek. The creek turns northwest and then west near the ghost town of Ashwood, straddling the Jefferson/Wasco county line. It receives Antelope Creek on the right bank. Highway 97 crosses the creek near Willowdale. Several miles downstream, Trout Creek receives Hay and Mud Springs creeks on the left bank. It then flows into the Deschutes River 87 miles (140 km) above its confluence with the Columbia River.

== Watershed ==
Trout Creek drains 692 square miles (1,792 km^{2}) of central Oregon. Elevations range from 5,940 feet (1,810 m) near the creek's headwaters to 1,283 feet (391 m) at its mouth. The average precipitation in the watershed ranges from 8 to 10 inches (203 to 254 mm) in the lower regions to 28 inches (711 mm) in the mountains. Eighty-eight percent of the watershed is privately owned, while the remaining twelve percent is owned by the United States Forest Service, Bureau of Land Management, and United States Department of Agriculture. Eighty-six percent is rangeland, twelve percent is forested, two percent is used for agriculture, and less than one percent is urban or rural.

== History ==
Humans first arrived in the Trout Creek area around 10,000 years ago. A pit-house discovered near Willowdale dates back at least 5,000 years. The first European Americans to arrive in the area were fur traders in the 1820s, including a group led by Peter Skene Ogden. The first settlers arrived in the 1860s. In 1896 and 1897, gold and silver were discovered. The Ashwood post office opened in 1898, and it quickly expanded as silver and cinnabar mines operated in the area. Many homesteaders arrived in the area in the early 1910s, and cinnabar production peaked in the 1960s. After major floods in 1964, the United States Army Corps of Engineers straightened portions of Trout Creek, creating berms that have obstructed some of the creek's smaller tributaries.

== See also ==
- List of rivers of Oregon
- List of longest streams of Oregon
