= Culver High School =

Public school in Culver, Oregon, United States

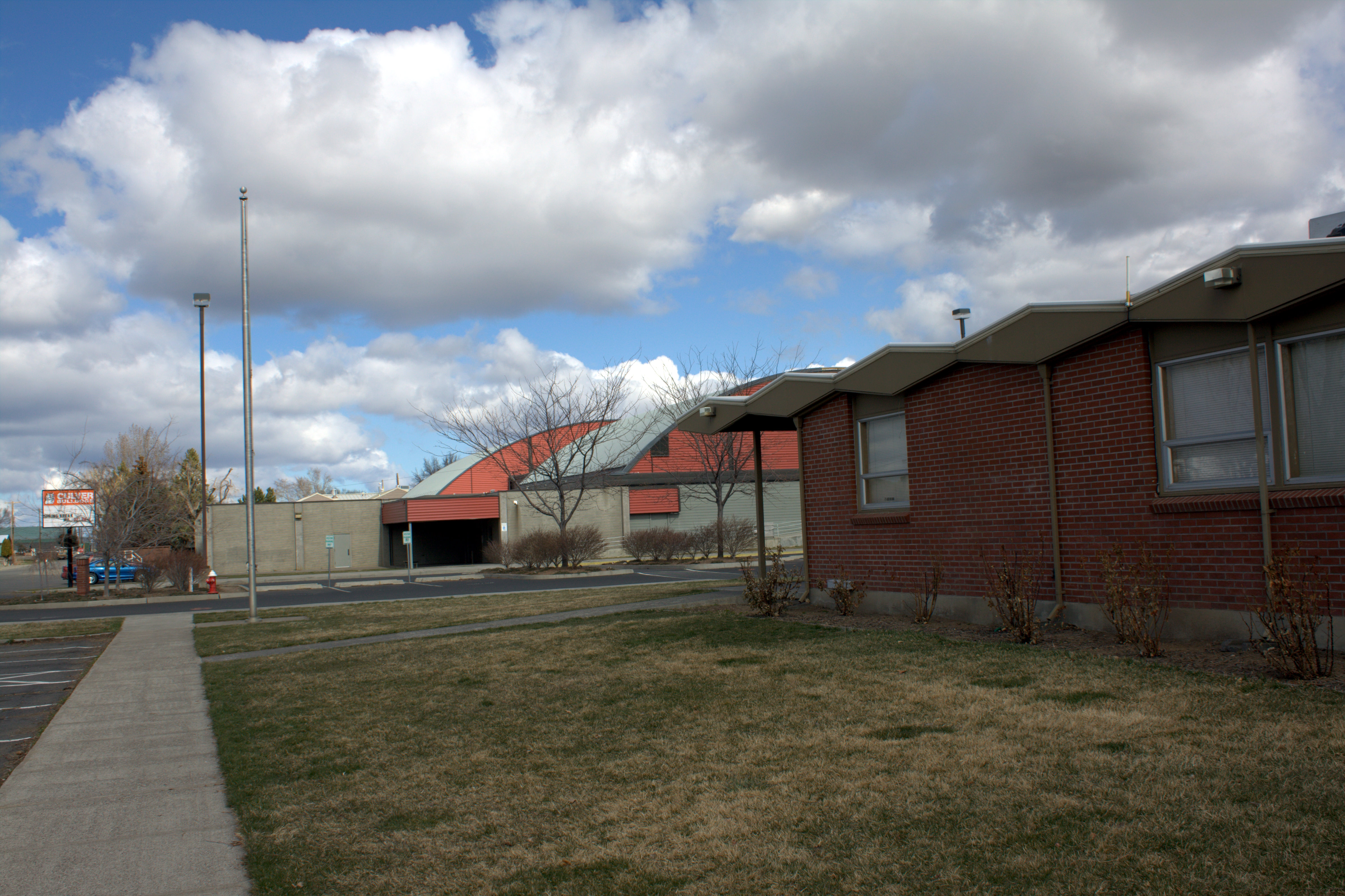

Location
- 5th Avenue & E Street; Culver, (Jefferson County), Oregon 97334; United States; 44.5229°N 121.2136°W

Information
- Type: Public
- School district: Culver School District
- Principal: Scott Novelli
- Grades: 9-12
- Enrollment: 229 (2024-2025)
- Colors: Black and orange
- Athletics conference: OSAA Tri-River Conference 2A-3
- Mascot: Bulldog
- Website: Culver HS website

Culver High School is a public high school in District #4 of Culver, Oregon, United States. It is a part of the Culver School District. The district includes, in addition to Culver, a section of Crooked River Ranch.

== Student Profile ==
In the 2021–2022 school year, Culver's student population was 70.9% white, 25.6% Hispanic, 2.0% Native American/Alaskan Native, 0.5% African American, and 1% mixed race. The school's gender breakdown is 46% female and 54% male.

== Academics ==
In 2008, 79% of the school's seniors received a high school diploma. Of 57 students, 45 graduated, two received a modified diploma, and ten dropped out.

These rates increased dramatically in the following years. In 2021, 92% of the school's seniors received a high school diploma. Of 49 students, 45 graduated, one received an alternative certification, and 3 dropped out.

Special Programs

Culver has been publicly acknowledged for their work with STEM and Project Based Learning. Out of over 4,1000 entries, Culver High School has been listed as one of the top five finalists for this Oregon educational program that promotes STEM-based problem solving.

Culver is also home to the Agriculture Skills Hub. The program is run through the Oregon CTE Revitalization Grant, which funds projects at the district level to support student engagement and success, boost graduation rates, career, and college preparation, and contribute to local and regional economic development.

Extracurricular Activities

Culver Future Farmers of America has competed at the state level and further represented Oregon at the national level. Most recently, the Culver Agricultural Sales team represented Oregon at the 2022 National FFA Convention.

== Athletics ==
The Mascot of Culver High School is a Bulldog. The school frequently competes in a variety of sports, mostly playing within the OSAA Tri-River Conference.

State Championships

Football - 1955, 1956, 1974,1975, 1976, 2007,

Volleyball - 1987, 2012

Wrestling - 2007, 2008, 2009, 2010, 2011, 2012, 2014, 2015, 2016, 2017, 2018, 2019

== Notable alumni ==
- Rex Barber, World War II Fighter Pilot
- Tommy Hinkley, actor Hard Knocks
