= Metolius station =

- Oregon Trunk Passenger and Freight Station
- U.S. National Register of Historic Places
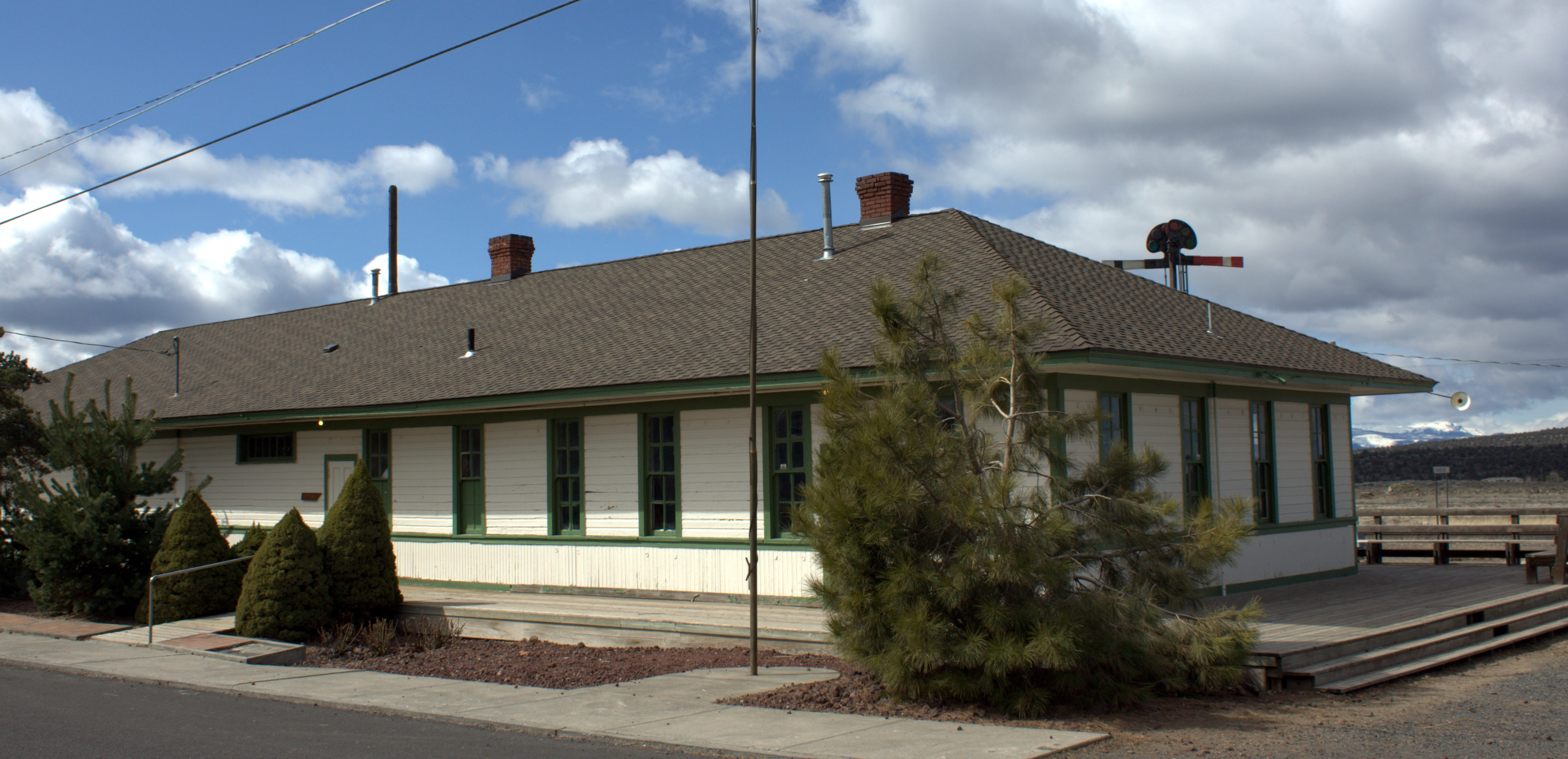

- Location within Oregon Location within the United States
- Location: Washington St. at the foot of Sixth St., Metolius, Oregon
- Coordinates: 44°35′15″N 121°10′39″W
- Area: 0.2 acres (0.081 ha)
- Built: 1911
- Built by: Oregon Trunk Railway Co.
- Architectural style: Stick
- NRHP reference No.: 86000285
- Added to NRHP: February 27, 1986

Metolius station, also known as the Oregon Trunk Passenger and Freight Station, is a historic railway station located on Washington Street at the foot of Sixth Street in Metolius, Oregon. The station was built in 1911 to serve passenger and freight traffic along the Oregon Trunk Railway, which provided a railway connection for towns in central Oregon. The station building has a Stick Style design and was built to a standard station plan used by the line. As the railroad entered a canyon on the Deschutes River near Metolius, it became an important station on the line, as its railway yard housed the pusher locomotives needed to help trains out of the canyon. The railway opened up previously inaccessible land to homesteaders; some of these homesteaders settled in the Metolius area, while others traveled further down the line to Redmond and Bend. The station closed in 1983; by then it served the Burlington Northern Railroad, which sold the building to the city of Metolius the next year.

The station was listed on the National Register of Historic Places on February 27, 1986.

== See also ==
- National Register of Historic Places listings in Jefferson County, Oregon
