= Gateway, Oregon =

Unincorporated community in the state of Oregon, United States

- Unincorporated community
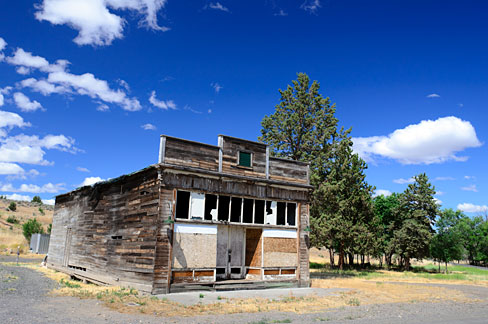
- Old abandon building in Gateway

- Location within Oregon Location within the United States
- Coordinates: 44°46′31″N 121°4′58″W
- Country: United States
- State: Oregon
- County: Jefferson
- Elevation: 1,795 ft (547 m)
- Time zone: UTC-8 (PST)
  - Summer (DST): UTC-7 (PDT)
- ZIP code: 97741
- Area code: 541

Gateway is an unincorporated community in Jefferson County, Oregon, United States. It is located about 16 miles east of Warm Springs.

Gateway was named for a depression in the terrain north of Madras formed by the erosion of Trout Creek and its tributaries, which created a natural gateway for north–south railroad and vehicular traffic through Central Oregon. The name Gateway was applied to the post office at this locale in 1913. The post office, which was established about three miles from present-day Gateway, was originally called Youngs after local resident Louis A. Young. Gateway post office closed in 1956. The Proprietor of the Store and Post Office was Noah Vibbert.

The station on the Oregon Trunk Railway in Gateway was also known as Galloway (not to be confused with the post office of the same name in Morrow County). Today the rail line is owned by the BNSF Railway.

At one time the community had a school, a church, a railroad depot, and a store.
