= Kilts, Oregon =

Unincorporated community in the state of Oregon, United States

- Unincorporated community
- Location within Oregon Location within the United States
- Coordinates: 44.7542950°N 120.6511423°W
- Country: United States
- State: Oregon
- County: Jefferson
- Elevation: 3,396 ft (1,035 m)
- Time zone: UTC-8 (Pacific (PST))
  - Summer (DST): UTC-7 (PDT)
- ZIP code: 97711
- Area codes: 458 and 541

Kilts is a historic unincorporated community in Jefferson County, Oregon, United States. Kilts is located about 20 miles south of Antelope, and 10 miles east of Ashwood. The area was first known as "Axehandle", later “Donnybrook” and then as "Kilts".

== History ==
Axehandle was located at 44.7506839°N 120.6511421°W. It was about a quarter mile south of Donnybrook. The locale of Axehandle was named for Axehandle Spring, which was given its name in the late 19th century by some wood haulers from Antelope who found a broken axehandle near a watering hole while working to bring wood from the Blue Mountains. The "Axehandle" moniker came to comprise the area of several ranches.

Donnybrook is located at 44.7542950°N 120.6511423°W. The name was coined by Joe Brannon for a brawl ("donnybrook", named for the Donnybrook Fair, which took place in Donnybrook, Dublin, Ireland) among some Irish sheepherders during the homestead era. At one time Donnybrook had a school.

Jesse Kilts homesteaded in the area, and when a post office was established on September 15, 1914, it was named for Mr. Kilts, whose wife, Ruth, was the first postmaster. Kilts post office closed on June 29, 1940. According to Oregon Geographic Names, Kilts was considered a newcomer in the area, and longtime residents have always called the locale "Donnybrook" instead of "Kilts". Modern atlases show the locale as "Donnybrook". The location of Kilts post office moved many times, as was common in the pioneer era. According to author Ralph Friedman, as of 1993 only one of the private homes in which the post office was located was still standing, all the rest having been burned or torn down. One location of Kilts was 44.7387402°N 120.5955845°W.
