= 1924 United States presidential election in Oregon =

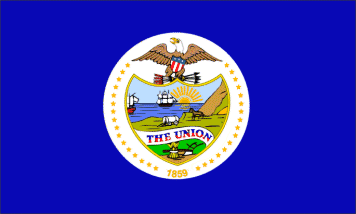
- November 4, 1924

Nominee	Calvin Coolidge	Robert M. La Follette	John W. Davis
Party	Republican	Independent	Democratic
Alliance		Progressive
Home state	Massachusetts	Wisconsin	West Virginia
Running mate	Charles G. Dawes	Burton K. Wheeler	Charles W. Bryan
Electoral vote	5	0	0
Popular vote	142,579	68,403	67,589
Percentage	51.01%	24.47%	24.18%
County results
Coolidge
30–40%
40–50%
50–60%
60–70%
President before election
Calvin Coolidge
Republican
Elected President
Calvin Coolidge
Republican

The 1924 United States presidential election in Oregon took place on November 4, 1924, as part of the 1924 United States presidential election which was held throughout all contemporary 48 states. State voters chose five representatives, or electors to the Electoral College, who voted for president and vice president.

Outside a few Presidential and gubernatorial elections, Oregon was a virtually one-party Republican state during the “System of 1896”, where the only competition was via Republican primaries. Apart from Woodrow Wilson’s two elections, during the first of which the GOP was severely divided, no Democrat since William Jennings Bryan in 1900 had carried a single county in the state.

Still, in the previous 1920 election Oregon saw less decline from Wilson's 1916 support than any other state in the West or Plains, so that after being Wilson's poorest state in this region it was James M. Cox’s strongest therein. Despite continuing overwhelming Republican dominance of the state legislature, 1922 had seen incumbent Governor Ben W. Olcott denounce the powerful Ku Klux Klan with the result that Democratic nominee Walter Pierce won the election on a platform to make attendance at public schools compulsory, without support from the more progressive faction of the dominant Republican Party. The 1922 House of Representatives elections also saw Oregon elect to the 3rd District its first Democratic representative since 1880 in Elton Watkins. Pierce did pass this law with overwhelming support from conservative Republicans in the legislature, only to find it overruled by both the Oregon Supreme Court and later federally in Pierce v. Society of Sisters.

However, the division of the Democratic Party over the Ku Klux Klan – which at the time all but ruled Oregon with its reputation for fanatical racism and anti-Catholicism – alongside maverick veteran Wisconsin Senator Robert La Follette’s decision to mount a third-party presidential campaign ensured by late summer that the Republicans would be unchallenged in carrying Oregon, especially after La Follette denounced the Klan, which was highly popular amongst working Oregonians.

Polls consistently showed that Oregon would remain firmly in Republican hands, and by mid-October it was clear that La Follette and Davis would run close for second place. Ultimately La Follette edged Davis out for second place by a mere 814 votes out of 279,488, although Oregon was still Davis’ best state west of the Continental Divide apart from the two less isolationist states of Southern-leaning Arizona and Mormon Utah, with the Democrat's best vote coming from historically Democratic and Ozark mountaineer-settled Eastern Oregon. Coolidge nonetheless carried every county, and won all but Jefferson and Umatilla counties by double digits.

== Results ==
Presidential Candidate	Running Mate	Party	Electoral Vote (EV)	Popular Vote (PV)	
Calvin Coolidge of Massachusetts	Charles Dawes	Republican	5	142,579	51.01%
Robert M. La Follette	Burton K. Wheeler	Independent (Note: Although La Follette was nationally the nominee of the Progressive Party, he ran as an independent candidate without a party label in Oregon.)	0	68,403	24.47%
John W. Davis	Charles W. Bryan	Democratic	0	67,589	24.18%
Frank T. Johns	Verne L. Reynolds	Socialist Labor	0	917	0.33%

=== Results by county ===
County	Calvin Coolidge Republican		John W. Davis Democratic		Robert M. La Follette Independent		Frank T. Johns Socialist Labor		Margin (Note: Because La Follette finished second ahead of Davis in Oregon as a whole, all margins given are Coolidge vote minus La Follette vote and percentage margin Coolidge percentage minus La Follette percentage unless stated otherwise for the county in question.)		Total votes cast
County	#	%	#	%	#	%	#	%	#	%	Total votes cast
Baker	2,803	45.41%	2,004	32.47%	1,356	21.97%	9	0.15%	799 (Note: In this county where Davis did run ahead of La Follette, margin given is Coolidge vote minus Davis vote and percentage margin Coolidge percentage minus Davis percentage.)	12.95%	6,172
Benton	3,417	60.68%	1,579	28.04%	623	11.06%	12	0.21%	1,838	32.64%	5,631
Clackamas	5,864	43.28%	3,099	22.87%	4,508	33.27%	77	0.57%	1,356	10.01%	13,548
Clatsop	3,313	56.33%	1,373	23.35%	1,158	19.69%	37	0.63%	1,940	32.99%	5,881
Columbia	2,483	56.20%	1,015	22.97%	896	20.28%	24	0.54%	1,468	33.23%	4,418
Coos	3,905	48.39%	1,757	21.77%	2,359	29.23%	49	0.61%	1,546	19.16%	8,070
Crook	725	50.73%	434	30.37%	266	18.61%	4	0.28%	291	20.36%	1,429
Curry	664	54.70%	224	18.45%	317	26.11%	9	0.74%	347	28.58%	1,214
Deschutes	2,321	53.02%	1,015	23.18%	1,013	23.14%	29	0.66%	1,306	29.83%	4,378
Douglas	4,219	53.75%	1,666	21.23%	1,943	24.75%	21	0.27%	2,276	29.00%	7,849
Gilliam	738	50.20%	521	35.44%	207	14.08%	4	0.27%	217	14.76%	1,470
Grant	1,126	56.90%	459	23.19%	380	19.20%	14	0.71%	667	33.70%	1,979
Harney	851	53.83%	436	27.58%	285	18.03%	9	0.57%	415	26.25%	1,581
Hood River	1,214	48.44%	683	27.25%	600	23.94%	9	0.36%	531	21.19%	2,506
Jackson	4,868	53.25%	1,840	20.13%	2,408	26.34%	25	0.27%	2,460	26.91%	9,141
Jefferson	374	39.00%	242	25.23%	334	34.83%	9	0.94%	40	4.17%	959
Josephine	1,756	53.91%	650	19.96%	835	25.64%	16	0.49%	921	28.28%	3,257
Klamath	2,775	53.48%	680	13.10%	1,715	33.05%	19	0.37%	1,060	20.43%	5,189
Lake	917	60.33%	304	20.00%	295	19.41%	4	0.26%	613	40.33%	1,520
Lane	8,551	59.90%	3,255	22.80%	2,416	16.92%	53	0.37%	5,296	37.10%	14,275
Lincoln	1,328	52.20%	641	25.20%	552	21.70%	23	0.90%	687	27.00%	2,544
Linn	4,141	49.56%	2,618	31.33%	1,575	18.85%	21	0.25%	1,523	18.23%	8,355
Malheur	1,671	51.94%	828	25.74%	710	22.07%	8	0.25%	843	26.20%	3,217
Marion	8,351	52.14%	3,996	24.95%	3,631	22.67%	38	0.24%	4,355	27.19%	16,016
Morrow	991	53.34%	397	21.37%	462	24.87%	8	0.43%	529	28.47%	1,858
Multnomah	48,866	49.98%	21,733	22.23%	26,932	27.55%	233	0.24%	21,934	22.44%	97,764
Polk	2,755	52.75%	1,621	31.04%	831	15.91%	16	0.31%	1,134	21.71%	5,223
Sherman	756	55.92%	367	27.14%	229	16.94%	0	0.00%	389	28.77%	1,352
Tillamook	2,201	59.18%	795	21.38%	700	18.82%	23	0.62%	1,406	37.81%	3,719
Umatilla	3,854	44.71%	3,052	35.41%	1,693	19.64%	21	0.24%	802	9.30%	8,620
Union	2,428	42.87%	1,816	32.07%	1,398	24.69%	21	0.37%	612	10.81%	5,663
Wallowa	1,253	46.29%	973	35.94%	471	17.40%	10	0.37%	280	10.34%	2,707
Wasco	2,409	51.46%	1,185	25.32%	1,069	22.84%	18	0.38%	1,224	26.15%	4,681
Washington	4,203	45.98%	2,103	23.01%	2,809	30.73%	26	0.28%	1,394	15.25%	9,141
Wheeler	685	68.43%	213	21.28%	103	10.29%	0	0.00%	472	47.15%	1,001
Yamhill	3,803	53.11%	2,015	28.14%	1,324	18.49%	18	0.25%	1,788	24.97%	7,160
Totals	142,579	51.01%	67,589	24.18%	68,403	24.47%	917	0.33%	74,176	26.54%	279,488

== See also ==
- United States presidential elections in Oregon
