= Horse Heaven, Oregon =

Ghost town in the State of Oregon, United States

- Ghost town
- Location within Oregon Location within the United States
- Coordinates: 44°42′56″N 120°30′26″W
- Country: United States
- State: Oregon
- County: Jefferson
- Named for: Herds of grazing horses
- Elevation: 3,150 ft (960 m)
- Time zone: UTC-8 (PST)
  - Summer (DST): UTC-7 (PDT)
- Coordinates and elevation from United States Geological Survey

Horse Heaven is a ghost town in Jefferson County in the U.S. state of Oregon. The settlement, which had a post office from 1938 to 1946, is 46 miles (74 km) east of Madras and 18 miles (29 km) east of Ashwood.

According to a letter written in 1946 by the Horse Heaven postmaster, Frank E. Lewis, the name for the settlement stemmed from herds of horses that thrived on the local grasses and drank from unfenced springs. Mary E. Finnall, the first postmaster, received the Horse Heaven mail twice a week from Ashwood. Homesteaders settled in the general vicinity, but most had moved away by 1946, when the post office closed. Horse Heaven Mountain and Horse Heaven Creek take their name from the settlement.

After two men discovered cinnabar, an ore of mercury, in the area in 1933, mercury production began there in 1934. Two years later, Horse Heaven Mines, a subsidiary of Sun Oil Company, took over and continued mining until 1944, when fire destroyed the ore-processing furnace, power plant, and other structures. The mine closed in 1945 but re-opened in 1955 with a new furnace. Much of the mine collapsed between then and 1958, when the mine closed again.

The Horse Heaven Mine site covers about 40 acres (16 ha). A seasonal residential cabin as well as outbuildings and historic structures related to the mining era are nearby. Most of the mining and processing equipment is gone. In 2005 the Oregon Department of Environmental Quality recommended remedial action involving mercury and arsenic in mine wastes at the site.

== See also ==
- Horse Heaven, Washington
- List of ghost towns in Oregon
