= Geneva, Oregon =

Geneva
- Ghost town
- Location within Oregon Location within the United States
- Coordinates: 44.4735°N 121.3917°W
- Country: United States
- State: Oregon
- County: Jefferson County
- Established: 1910

Geneva is a ghost town located in Jefferson County, Oregon, United States, on the shore of Lake Chinook. The town was established in 1910. It was named after its founder's wife, Geneva, who was appointed postmaster when the town's post office opened in 1914.
