= Olallie Scenic Area =

Oregon scenic area

Olallie Lake
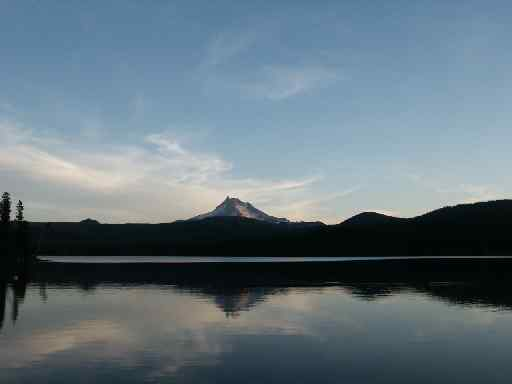
- Olallie Lake and Mount Jefferson

- Location within Oregon Location within the United States
- Location: Jefferson / Marion counties, Oregon, United States
- Coordinates: 44°48′25″N 121°47′15″W
- Type: mountain
- Basin countries: United States
- Surface area: 240 acres (97 ha)
- Average depth: 17 ft (5.2 m)
- Max. depth: 43 ft (13 m)
- Water volume: 5,001,333 cubic yards (3,823,793 m^{3})
- Shore length^{1}: 3.9 miles (6.3 km)
- Surface elevation: 4,941 ft (1,506 m)
- ^{1} Shore length is not a well-defined measure.

Olallie Scenic Area is a United States Forest Service designated scenic area located in Oregon's Cascade Range. It is between Mount Hood on the north and Mount Jefferson to the south and contains Olallie Lake along with several smaller lakes. The name Olallie is Chinook Jargon for berry. Olallie Lake is open to vehicle traffic June to September. There is no cellphone service.

== Geography and ecology ==
Located in Jefferson and Marion counties at 4,500 feet (1,400 m) above sea level, the area is home to over 200 lakes that lie in the shadow of 7,215-foot (2,199 m) Olallie Butte and Mount Jefferson. The largest of these lakes is the namesake Olallie Lake that has a 3.9-mile (6.3 km) shoreline. The lake sits at 4,900 feet (1,500 m) and is 240 acres (0.97 km^{2}) in size with a maximum depth of 43 feet (13 m). The Oregon Department of Fish and Wildlife stocks the lake with both Rainbow trout and Brook trout. Mill Creek on the eastern shore is the only outflow, and once had a small dam to help keep water levels constant. Other lakes include Triangle, Lower, First, Head, Horse Shoe, Spoon, Surprise, Fish, Giffords, View, Top, Fork, Upper, Timber, Red, Averil, Wall, Sheep, and countless more.

The glaciated region is roughly 89% forested with Noble fir, western hemlock, cedar species, pacific silver fir, mountain hemlock and several other tree species. Crossed by the Pacific Crest Trail, Olallie is in the shadow of Mount Jefferson within the Mount Hood National Forest and on the border of the Warm Springs Indian Reservation. There are some meadows and marshes—Olallie Meadow, at 100 acres (40 ha), is the largest—and home to a former ranger station.

== Facilities and recreation ==
Olallie Lake Guard Station is listed on the National Register of Historic Places and is near the west end of Olallie Lake.

Recreation includes camping at Forest Service improved campgrounds, cabins and yurts at the Olallie Lake Resort. The use of motor boats is prohibited on the snow melt fed alpine lakes by state law; the Olallie Resort has paddle boats and rowboats for rent. Access is via Forest Road 46 to Forest Road 4690 to Forest Road 4220 or from Forest Road 42 to Forest Road 4220. These roads are closed in the winter. The last few miles of Forest Road 4220 are gravel. The Scenic Area has seven campgrounds; they are Olallie Meadows, Camp Ten, Paul Dennis, Peninsula, Lower Lake, Horseshoe Lake, and Triangle Lake Equestrian.

== See also ==
- List of lakes in Oregon
