= Olallie Butte =

Mountain in United States of America

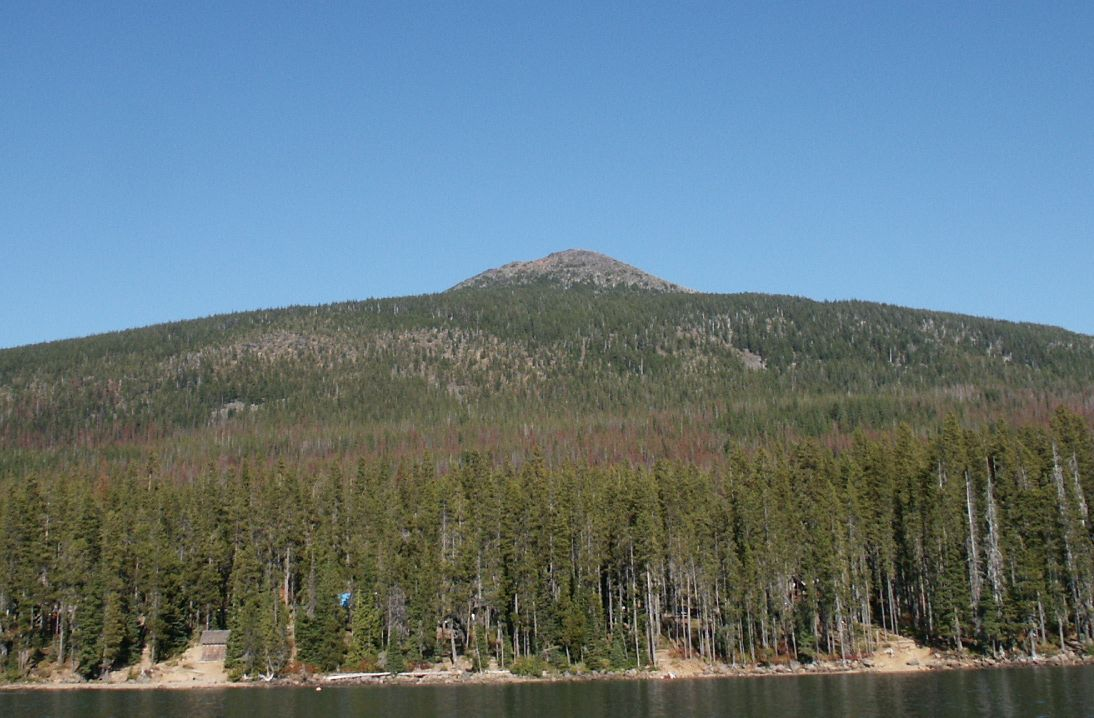
- Olallie Butte from the south

Highest point
- Elevation: 7,219 ft (2,200 m)
- Coordinates: 44°49′14″N 121°45′49″W

Geography
- Location within Oregon
- Location: Jefferson, Marion and Wasco counties, Oregon, United States
- Parent range: Cascades
- Topo map: USGS Olallie Butte

Geology
- Rock age: Pleistocene
- Mountain type: Shield volcano
- Volcanic arc: Cascade Volcanic Arc
- Last eruption: More than 25,000 years ago

Climbing
- Easiest route: Trail

Olallie Butte is a steep-sided shield volcano in the Cascade Range of the northern part of the U.S. state of Oregon. It is the largest volcano and highest point in the 50-mile (80 km) distance between Mount Hood and Mount Jefferson. Located just outside the Olallie Scenic Area, it is surrounded by more than 200 lakes and ponds fed by runoff, precipitation, and underground seepage, which are popular spots for fishing, boating, and swimming. The butte forms a prominent feature in the Mount Jefferson region and is usually covered with snow during the winter and spring seasons.

Part of a stretch of shield volcanoes in Oregon with an unusually low elevation, meaning they have undergone less erosion over time than surrounding volcanic centers, Olallie has been excavated by glacial erosion on its northeastern flank. Its central volcanic plug has also been exposed. Comparisons of its morphology with Mount Jefferson suggest an age for the butte between 70,000 and 100,000 years; there is no evidence that it has erupted within the past 25,000 years. Olallie Butte has a steep, conical shape that serves as a transitional morphology between steep, mafic (rich in magnesium and iron) volcanoes like Mount McLoughlin and Mount Thielsen and flatter, mafic shields. It is made of basaltic andesite.

A Forest Service fire lookout tower was built on the summit in 1915 but abandoned in 1967; the summit also had a cupola cabin from 1920 until its roof collapsed in 1982. Olallie gets its name from the Chinook Jargon word olallie, which means berries. Today, the butte lies within the Warm Springs Indian Reservation. The Pacific Crest Trail passes over the western side of the butte, and there are other trails that reach the mountain's summit. Although the main trail to the summit is not well maintained, it still remains open to hikers.

== Geography ==
Olallie Butte is located within Jefferson, Marion, and Wasco counties, all within the northwestern to north-central part of the U.S. state of Oregon. The volcano lies just outside the irregularly shaped Olallie Roadless Area, which lies within the Mount Hood National Forest to the west of the major crest of the Cascade Range and directly north of the Mount Jefferson Wilderness. This region encompasses 13 square miles (34 km^{2}) of an upland area with small volcanoes, bordered to the southwest by the canyon wall of the North Fork of the Breitenbush River. It can be accessed from trails running from the Clackamas and Breitenbush River drainages, which reach the eastern and southern parts of the Olallie Area, as well as logging roads that enter the Olallie roadless area at its northern portion.

Williams (1916) reported that Olallie Butte had a number of small, unnamed lakes, particularly concentrated at its southern base, which were mostly shallow. According to Johnson et al. (1985), dozens of these lakes were carved by the movement of glaciers over Olallie Butte. Olallie Lake is the largest of more than 200 bodies of water near Olallie Butte's base and contained in the 14,238-acre (57.62 km^{2}) Olallie Lake Scenic Area in Mount Hood National Forest's southern segment. Fed by runoff, precipitation, and subsurface seepage, Olallie Lake otherwise has no clear source of inflow or outflow, nor do many other lakes in the Olallie Butte area. To maintain Olallie Lake's water level, a low dam was built on the Mill Creek outlet, which flows east to Long Lake. Shitike Creek heads between Olallie Butte and Mount Jefferson, coursing east to the Warm Springs community before it joins the Deschutes River.

Usually covered with snow in the winter and spring seasons, Olallie Butte is a prominent feature in the Mount Jefferson region. According to the U.S. National Geodetic Survey, Olallie Butte has an elevation of 7,219 feet (2,200 m); the Geographic Names Information System lists its elevation as 7,205 feet (2,196 m), while Hildreth (2007) lists it at 7,215 feet (2,199 m). It has a proximal relief and distal relief of 2,330 feet (710 m) and 2,740 feet (835 m), respectively.^{[a]} Olallie Butte has a total volume of 1.2 cubic miles (5 km^{3}).

The cinder cone lies 10 miles (16 km) north of Mount Jefferson and 2 miles (3.2 km) to the northeast of Olallie Lake. Olallie Butte can be reached from Oregon Route 22 by following Breitenbush Road to the Olallie Lake Guard Station, then continuing on the main road along the transmission line. A trail to the summit of the mountain and a station runs for about 3 miles (4.8 km) from a trail marker located past a clearing on the main road; trucks cannot continue past this point.

== Ecology ==
Forest stands near Olallie Butte reflect their elevation in the Cascade Range and predominantly include lodgepole pine, mountain hemlock, noble fir, Pacific silver fir, western hemlock, and western white pine. Less common trees in the forested region include Alaska yellow cedar, alpine fir, Douglas fir, western red cedar, and whitebark pine; there are also a number of meadows, including Olallie Meadow, which covers an area of 100 acres (0.40 km^{2}) north of the Butte. Outbreaks of mountain pine beetle infestations have threatened the lodgepole pine trees throughout the area. Timber harvests are uncommon because forest managers want to keep trees for recreational purposes.

Olallie Lake has osprey nests on its shores. The Oregon Department of Fish and Wildlife stocks the lake each year with rainbow trout as well as brook trout, and kokanee salmon can also be found in the water. The lake is surrounded by huckleberry plants, which are typically ripe by the end of August. Possessing an average depth of 16.5 feet (5.0 m), Olallie Lake is shallow with rock-bottomed littoral zones and low mineral concentrations of ions, possibly because snow and rain supply most of its water. Low chlorophyll and phosphorus concentrations mean that its water is quite transparent, and its bottom is visible even at its deepest point, at 43 feet (13 m). Olallie Lake is ultraoligotrophic, with very low phytoplankton populations and no macrophyte growth at the lake bottom. The lake also sustains cool temperatures throughout the year, including the summer season.

In 1975, the Bonneville Power Administration drafted an Environmental Impact Statement for a proposed route through the area, noting that it would disturb the locale's cold, shallow rocky soil, which take long periods of time to form.

== Geology ==
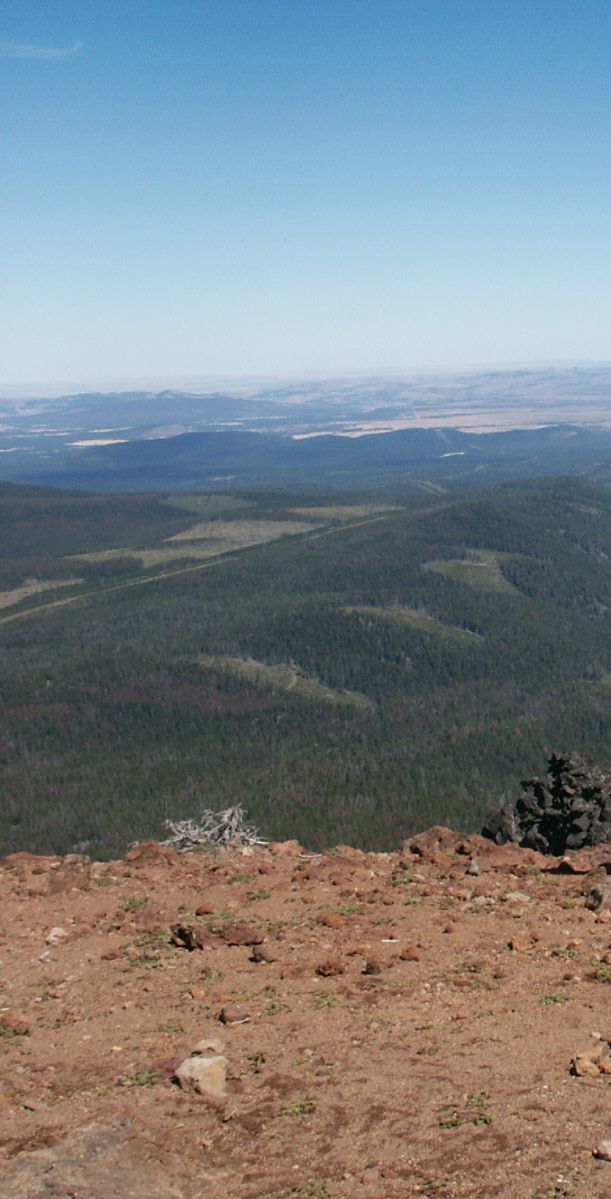
The view from the top of Olallie Butte

Part of the High Cascades segment of the larger Cascade Range, Olallie Butte is part of a stretch of shield volcanoes in Oregon with an unusually low elevation, meaning they have undergone less erosion over time than surrounding volcanic centers. Olallie Butte forms part of the Jefferson Reach, an axis of shield volcanoes, scoria cones, and lava domes 16 miles (25 km) in width that contains at least 175 Quaternary volcanoes. The Jefferson Reach's northern portion has an unusually low number of young volcanic centers (early Pleistocene or younger). The subsection including Olallie Butte consists mostly of Pleistocene or younger volcanoes, which are often glaciated. Of these volcanic vents, Olallie Butte and Sisi Butte are the two largest mafic (rich in magnesium and iron) shield volcanoes. Olallie Butte marks part of a region of basaltic andesite eruptions, also prominent at Three Fingered Jack, that extends north and south from Mount Jefferson.

Olallie Butte is considered a shield volcano, though it has a conical shape that serves as a transitional morphology between steep, mafic volcanoes like Mount McLoughlin and Mount Thielsen and flatter, mafic shields. Made of basaltic andesite, it has a mafic composition. Nearby volcanic vents include the Sisi Butte, South Pinhead, and West Pinhead shield volcanoes and the Fort Butte, North Pinhead, and Potato Butte cinder cones. Cinder cones in the area have gray-red cinders that have been oxidized, scoria, agglomerate, and small lava flows consisting of porphyritic basaltic andesite and black and yellow-brown to dark yellow-orange, palagonite basaltic andesite. The black and orange color of some of the eruptive material from these cones suggests that there was interaction of the lava with wet ground or snow, causing rapid chilling of the ejecta that prevented oxidation from taking place. At Double Peaks and an unnamed hill southwest of View Lake, there are gray-pink to light brown-gray hornblende dacite lava domes.

The volcanic cones at Olallie Butte and Mount Jefferson were erupted over deposits from the Minto lava group, which have been deeply eroded to create non-conforming surfaces. As a result, Olallie Butte has a relatively steeper slope, but there are lithologic similarities between the Olallie lavas and Minto lavas. Whereas Minto volcanoes follow a narrow, nearly linear arrangement south of Olallie Butte, north of Olallie the local volcanoes exhibit a scattered distribution across the plateau of the High Cascades. There are also transitional volcanoes not easily classified into either the Minto or Olallie group; their acidic composition suggests that they differentiated during the Minto eruptive phase, but progressive differentiation has been observed in the region, making definite conclusions about their categorization difficult.

Unlike Sisi Butte, Olallie Butte has undergone relatively little erosion. Glacial erosion exposed the central volcanic plug and excavated troughs on Olallie's northeastern side, suggesting that the volcano is at least 25,000 years old. Part of the steepness of lower slopes at Olallie can be explained by glacial erosion by an ice sheet somewhere between 500 and 1,000 feet (150 and 300 m) in thickness, which previously covered the Olallie area. Glacial till, consisting of angular blocks of basaltic andesite and andesite, forms a veneer throughout the Olallie area, covering about 50 percent of the land, so systematic geochemical samples are generally not considered informative for volcanic rocks near the Butte. The volcanic rock that can be studied is of Cenozoic age, consisting mostly of basaltic andesite and andesite lava flows and associated breccias. Most of these have a porphyritic texture, containing phenocrysts; basaltic andesite deposit phenocrysts are made of minerals like light to dark-gray hypersthene, clinopyroxene, or olivine, and the andesitic deposits have minerals such as platy pyroxene or olivine. Labradorite phenocrysts are common among both the basaltic andesite and regular andesite deposits, while magnetite is more rare. There has been very little geological alteration of these rocks other than a few instances of alteration of olivine to iddingsite. All the rocks in the area show a normal magnetic polarity, indicating ages less than one million years and corroborating that they are of Pleistocene age. The domes at Double Peaks and southwest of View Lake have phenocrysts with andesine and dark red-brown basaltic hornblende, the latter of which contained altered magnetite, iron oxide hematite, and other unspecified minerals.

Walker (1982) determined that the Olallie area was not a potential source for commercial deposits of minerals besides low-value rock that might be harvested for construction. However, there were other, better deposits of similar rock materials at more accessible locales nearby. Moreover, no studies have identified fuel repositories in the Olallie area, though Clackamas, Jefferson, Marion, and Wasco counties have been noted for having hot springs and therefore might serve as a future source of geothermal energy. None have been identified within the Olallie region, but they may be present and hidden by more recent rock layers or the cooling of rising thermal water.

=== Eruptive history ===
Olallie Butte is at least 25,000 years old, making it of Pleistocene age. It was likely built up by eruptions prior to the last glacial period. Comparisons of its morphology with Mount Jefferson suggest an age between 70,000 and 100,000 years. Thayer (1939) grouped eruptive activity at Olallie Butte with deposits at Mount Jefferson, Mount Hood, and Crater Lake (Mount Mazama) into the Olallie Lava group, which display highly variable thicknesses ranging from extremely thin to up to 5,000 feet (1,500 m).

Olallie Butte has not erupted within the past 10,000 years during the Holocene epoch. The biggest threat in the local region is from lava flows. There are also a number of dacite lava domes, which could collapse and generate small but dangerous pyroclastic flows or mudflows known as lahars.

== Human history ==
Olallie Butte was named in 1915 by the United States Board on Geographic Names. In 1921, they listed it within Marion and Wasco County, but later revised this to also list Olallie Butte as a feature within Jefferson County, Oregon. The Olallie Lake Resort, built in 1932, sits at a remote location in the Olallie Scenic Area. Open from June to October, it has a general store, rowboats, 10 cabins with wood-burning stoves, and no phone or internet service. There is also no electricity, gas, or ATM service.

The name Olallie derives from the Chinook Jargon olallie, which means berries; the term was historically used to refer to salmonberries. Olallie Butte is part of the Warm Springs Indian Reservation, and the Olallie Lake Scenic Area borders the reservation.

Olallie Butte has at its summit a United States Forest Service fire lookout tower, which was built in 1915 with a cab and tent cabin. It stands at a height of 30 feet (9.1 m). The mountain summit also had a cupola cabin beginning in 1920, though it was abandoned in 1967 and the roof collapsed in 1982. The structure's remains can still be seen on top of Olallie Butte. Olallie Butte is also close to a power transmission line corridor.

In the 1930s, the Civilian Conservation Corps built a two-story cabin, now known as the Olallie Lake Guard Station Cabin, at the south end of the Mount Hood National Forest for local forest rangers. With a rustic architectural style, it exemplifies buildings from the Depression period. In 1991, the building was added to the National Register of Historic Places. It now operates as a cabin for visitors, with a kitchen, living room, bunk bedroom, and loft for up to eight guests. Its lighting and refrigerator are fueled with propane, and it also has a stove, oven, water tank, and vault toilet. Located at an elevation of about 5,000 feet (1,500 m), it can be reached by motorized vehicles, though snow may impede access to the cabin.

== Recreation ==
Olallie Lake is a popular destination for fishing; swimming and motorized boats are not allowed there, though swimming is allowed at the nearby Head Lake. Boat rentals, as well as life jackets, are available through the Olallie Lake Resort.

Part of the Pacific Crest Trail runs through the area. Pacific Crest Trail #2000 (Clackamas) extends for 24.9 miles (40.1 km) into the Olallie Lake Scenic Area, with a 3.2 miles (5.1 km) segment that traverses the western side of Olallie Butte towards Olallie Lake before entering the Mount Jefferson Wilderness. There are a number of other trails for hikers of all ability levels. One trail extends to the summit of the Butte and offers a panoramic view of north-central Oregon. There is also a trail running 2.7 miles (4.3 km) around Olallie Lake, also known as Olallie Lake Trail 731. The western side of the butte can be climbed via a non-maintained trail that gains 2,580 feet (790 m) in elevation from Forest Road 4220, north of Olallie Lake. This trail passes through tribal land, running for about 3 miles (4.8 km) in length to the summit, where it offers excellent views of Mount Jefferson. The round trip runs for about 8 miles (13 km); there is no shade or water on the hike.

The United States Forest Service manages seven campgrounds in the Olallie area, including three on Olallie Lake. They have pit toilets and lack running water; no reservation is required to camp at any of these grounds. Throughout the Olallie Scenic Area campgrounds, there are 97 sites, each with campfire rings and picnic tables. The campgrounds have quiet hours from 10 pm to 6 am. The Olallie Lake Guard Station Cabin, operated by the United States Forest Service, can also be reserved from June through September for a fee of $750 per night.

== Footnotes ==
- [a] Hildreth (2007) defines proximal relief as the "difference between summit elevation and that of highest exposure of older rocks overlain by the edifice" and draping relief as the "difference between summit elevation and that of lowest distal lavas of the edifice (not including distal pyroclastic or debris flows)."

== Sources ==
- BPA Proposed FY 1976 Program: Environmental Impact Statement, Bonneville Power Administration, 1975, archived from the original on February 1, 2021.
- Hildreth, W. (2007). Quaternary Magmatism in the Cascades, Geologic Perspectives. United States Geological Survey. Professional Paper 1744. Archived from the original on March 25, 2019.
- Sloane, C. S., ed. (1921), Report of the United States Geographic Board, vol. 5, United States Government Publishing Office, archived from the original on February 1, 2021.
- Thayer, T. P. (1939), Geology of the Salem Hills and the North Santiam River basin, Oregon (PDF), Oregon Department of Geology and Mineral Industries, Bulletin 15, archived (PDF) from the original on March 17, 2017.
- Thayer, T. P. (November 1937). "Petrology of later Tertiary and Quaternary rocks of the north-central Cascade Mountains in Oregon, with notes on similar rocks in western Nevada". Bulletin of the Geological Society of America. 48 (11). Geological Society of America: 1611–1652. Bibcode:1937GSAB...48.1611T. doi:10.1130/GSAB-48-1611.
- Walder, J. S.; Gardner, C. A.; Conrey, R. M.; Fisher, B. J.; Schilling, S. P. (1999). Volcano Hazards in the Mount Jefferson Region, Oregon: Open-file Report 99-24. United States Geological Survey.
- Walker, G. W. (1982), "Mineral Resource Potential of the Olallie Roadless Area, Marion and Jefferson Counties, Oregon" (PDF), USGS Report, United States Geological Survey: 219, Bibcode:1982usgs.rept..219W, Open-File Report 82-885, archived (PDF) from the original on February 11, 2017.
- Walker, G. W.; Neumann, T. R. (1984), Marsh, S. P.; Kropschot, S. J.; Dickinson, R. G. (eds.), "Wilderness mineral potential: Assessment of mineral-resource potential in U.S. Forest Service lands studied in 1964-1984: Volume 2", Olallie Roadless Area, Oregon, Professional Paper, vol. 2, United States Government Publishing Office, pp. 899–901, Bibcode:1984usgs.rept...15M, doi:10.3133/pp1300, U.S. Geological Survey Professional Paper 1300, archived from the original on November 6, 2018.
- Williams, I. A. (1916), Mineral Resources of Oregon, vol. 2, Oregon Bureau of Mines and Geology, archived from the original on February 1, 2021.
- Wood, C. A.; Kienle, J. (1992). Volcanoes of North America: United States and Canada. Cambridge University Press. ISBN 978-0521438117.
