= Culver School District =

School district in Oregon, United States

Address
- 412 West E Street Culver, Oregon, 97734; United States

District information
- Type: Public
- Grades: PreK–12
- NCES District ID: 4103840

Students and staff
- Students: 644
- Teachers: 41.73 (FTE)
- Staff: 50.46 (FTE)
- Student–teacher ratio: 15.43

Other information
- Website: www.culver.k12.or.us

Culver School District is a public school district that serves the city of Culver, Oregon, United States, and the surrounding area of Jefferson County. It includes a portion of Crooked River Ranch.

The district consists of three schools on a single 37-acre (150,000 m^{2}) campus in Culver: Culver Elementary School, Culver Middle School, and Culver High School.

== Demographics ==
In the 2009 school year, the district had 11 students classified as homeless by the Department of Education, or 1.6% of students in the district.
