= Max and Ollie Lueddemann House =

Historic residence in Madras, Oregon, United States

- U.S. National Register of Historic Places
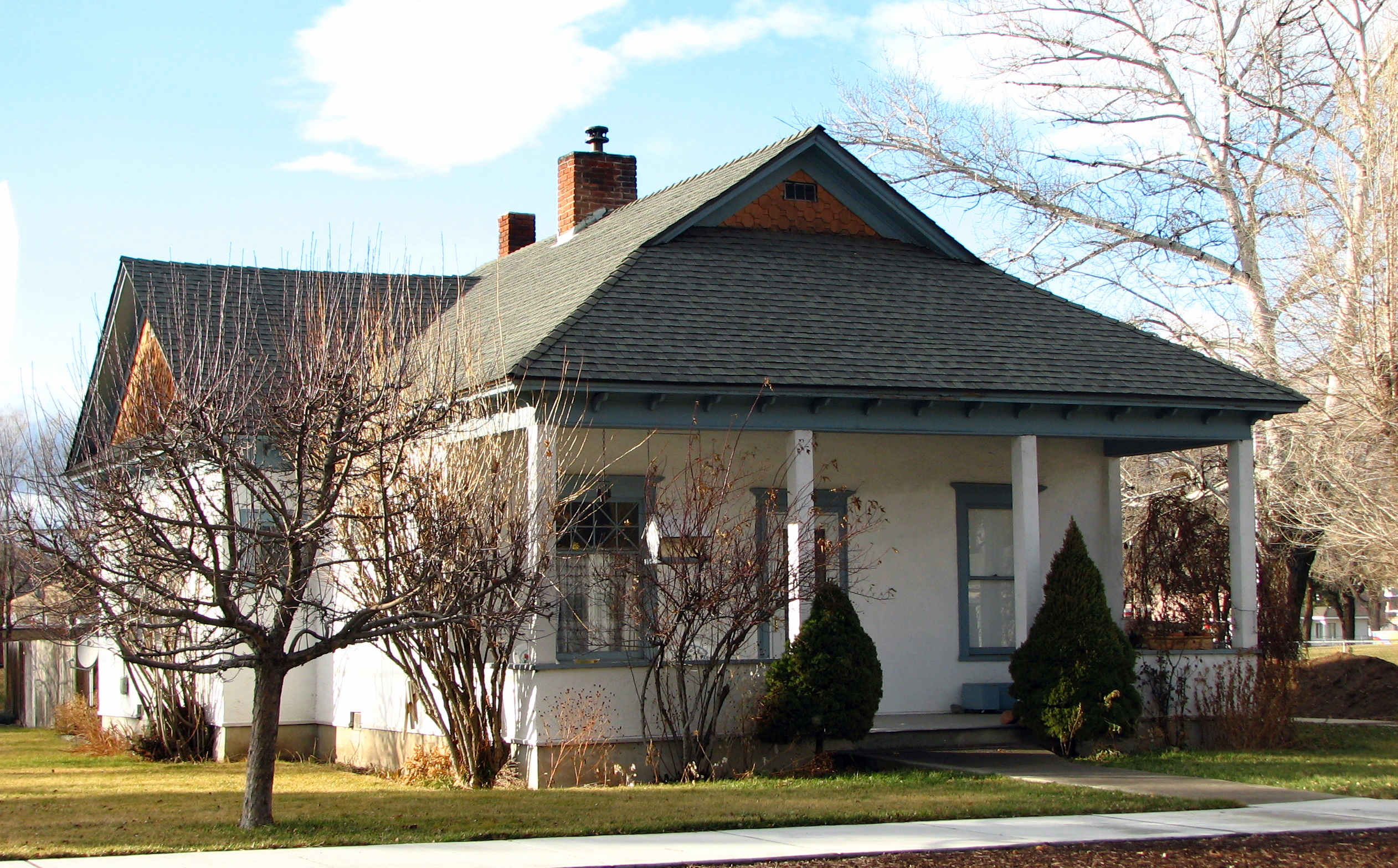
- The Lueddemann House in 2010

- Location within Oregon
- Location: 96 SE 9th Street; Madras, Oregon
- Coordinates: 44°38′06″N 121°07′33″W
- Area: 0.44 acres (0.18 ha)
- Built: 1905–1906
- Architectural style: Craftsman bungalow
- NRHP reference No.: 96000620
- Added to NRHP: June 3, 1996

The Max and Ollie Lueddemann House is a historic residence in Madras, Oregon, United States. Completed in 1906, only four years after Madras's first plat, it was the home of newspaper publisher and civic booster Max Lueddemann (1873–1954) until he moved on to Portland in 1909. Originally from Mississippi, Lueddemann arrived in Madras with his wife Ollie in 1905 when he purchased the Madras Pioneer to add to his portfolio of several Eastern Oregon newspapers. Despite his short tenure in Madras, Lueddemann gained significant respect as a journalist, business leader, and promoter of commercial and real estate development in the young town, and was still remembered at his death 45 years later. At the time of its construction, his house was of unusually sophisticated design and solid construction in the town's frontier atmosphere, and is one of very few near-unaltered houses remaining from Madras's earliest years.

The house was listed on the National Register of Historic Places in 1996.

== See also ==
- National Register of Historic Places listings in Jefferson County, Oregon
