= Culver, Oregon =

- City
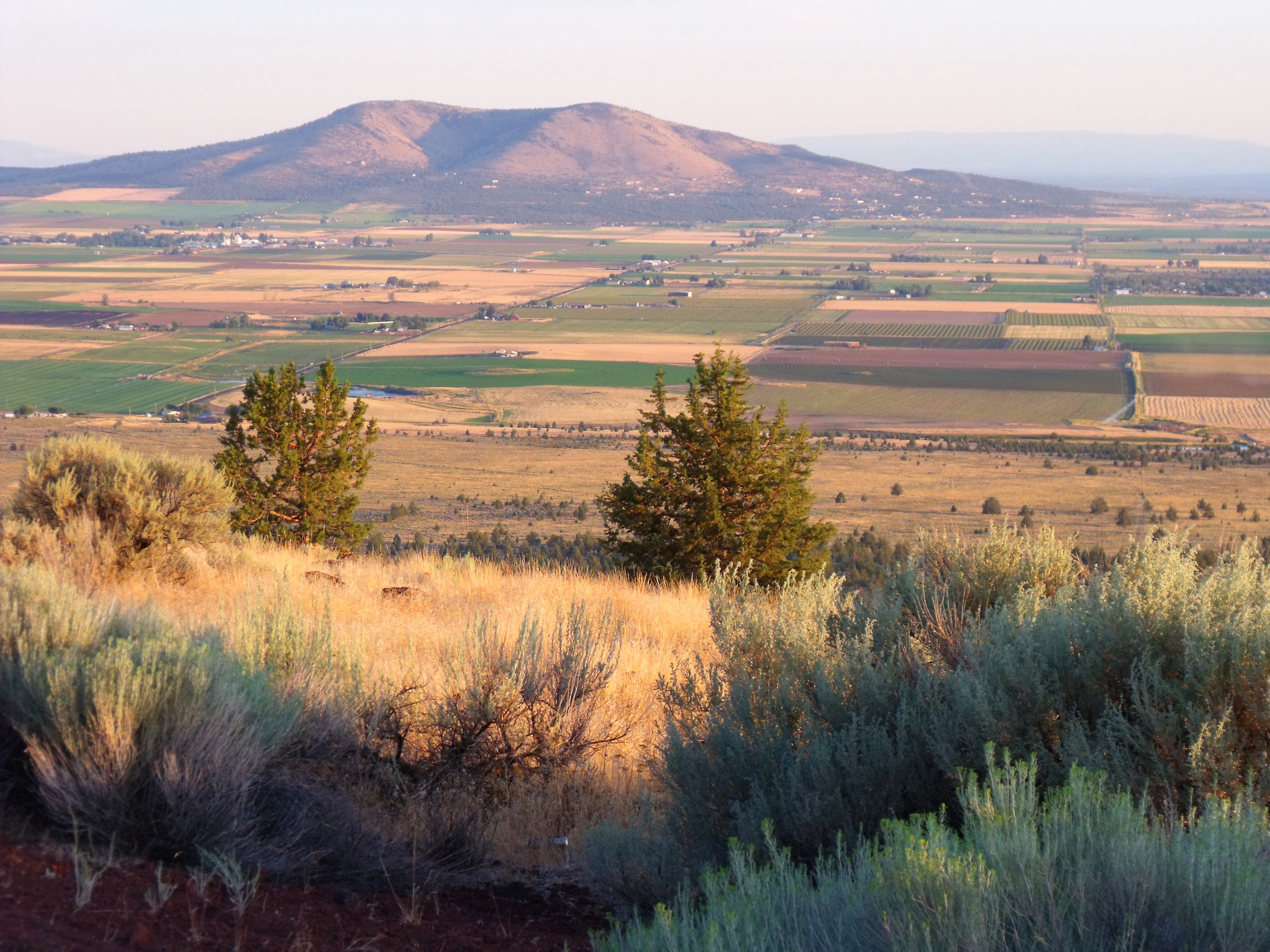
- View of Culver from Round Butte

- Location in Oregon
- Coordinates: 44°31′29″N 121°12′44″W
- Country: United States
- State: Oregon
- County: Jefferson
- Incorporated: 1946

Government
  - Mayor: Jake Schwab

Area
  - Total: 0.69 sq mi (1.80 km^{2})
  - Land: 0.69 sq mi (1.80 km^{2})
  - Water: 0 sq mi (0.00 km^{2})
- Elevation: 2,640 ft (804.7 m)

Population (2020)
  - Total: 1,602
  - Density: 2,303.9/sq mi (889.55/km^{2})
- Time zone: UTC-8 (Pacific)
  - Summer (DST): UTC-7 (Pacific)
- ZIP code: 97734
- Area code: 541
- FIPS code: 41-17300
- GNIS feature ID: 1140541
- Website: www.cityofculver.net

Culver is a city in Jefferson County, Oregon, United States. As of the 2020 census, Culver had a population of 1,602.

== History ==
Orace Gabriel Collver moved from Coos Bay, Oregon, to Central Oregon and founded the town of Culver. Since he was the postmaster, he got to name the town, but to avoid confusion with another town with similar spelling and sound, he changed it to Culver. He built a general store, which housed the post office and became the center of the community. In 1911, the railroad came through, but on the opposite side of the valley, so the town relocated to the railroad. Collver had the whole house moved to the new location, while the townspeople used the lumber from their old homes and buildings to build new ones. The upstairs of his store housed a meeting hall that was used for local events and dances.

Collver married Margaret J. Barnett on October 16, 1881. They raised Ruth Church, the daughter of his sister, Sarah Collver Church, after Sarah's death.

== Geography ==
According to the United States Census Bureau, the city has a total area of 0.69 square miles (1.79 km^{2}), all of it land.

== Demographics ==
Historical population
Census	Pop.	Note	%±
1930	62		—
1950	301		—
1960	301		0.0%
1970	407		35.2%
1980	514		26.3%
1990	570		10.9%
2000	802		40.7%
2010	1,357		69.2%
2020	1,602		18.1%

=== 2020 census ===
As of the 2020 census, Culver had a population of 1,602. The median age was 33.7 years. 28.5% of residents were under the age of 18 and 11.8% of residents were 65 years of age or older. For every 100 females there were 97.8 males, and for every 100 females age 18 and over there were 95.9 males age 18 and over.

0% of residents lived in urban areas, while 100.0% lived in rural areas.

There were 531 households in Culver, of which 43.1% had children under the age of 18 living in them. Of all households, 54.6% were married-couple households, 15.8% were households with a male householder and no spouse or partner present, and 21.7% were households with a female householder and no spouse or partner present. About 18.6% of all households were made up of individuals and 9.2% had someone living alone who was 65 years of age or older.

There were 561 housing units, of which 5.3% were vacant. Among occupied housing units, 77.4% were owner-occupied and 22.6% were renter-occupied. The homeowner vacancy rate was 1.4% and the rental vacancy rate was 3.9%.

Racial composition as of the 2020 census
Race	Number	Percent
White	1,043	65.1%
Black or African American	5	0.3%
American Indian and Alaska Native	31	1.9%
Asian	8	0.5%
Native Hawaiian and Other Pacific Islander	1	0.1%
Some other race	211	13.2%
Two or more races	303	18.9%
Hispanic or Latino (of any race)	499	31.1%

=== 2010 census ===
As of the census of 2010, there were 1,357 people, 436 households, and 338 families living in the city. The population density was 1,966.7 inhabitants per square mile (759.3/km^{2}). There were 482 housing units at an average density of 698.6 per square mile (269.7/km^{2}). The racial makeup of the city was 79.5% White, 0.4% African American, 3.3% Native American, 0.4% Asian, 0.1% Pacific Islander, 13.0% from other races, and 3.4% from two or more races. Hispanic or Latino of any race were 30.4% of the population.

There were 436 households, of which 53.4% had children under the age of 18 living with them, 56.2% were married couples living together, 13.3% had a female householder with no husband present, 8.0% had a male householder with no wife present, and 22.5% were non-families. 18.3% of all households were made up of individuals, and 7.3% had someone living alone who was 65 years of age or older. The average household size was 3.10 and the average family size was 3.51.

The median age in the city was 30.3 years. 36.2% of residents were under the age of 18; 6.9% were between the ages of 18 and 24; 27.1% were from 25 to 44; 21.3% were from 45 to 64; and 8.4% were 65 years of age or older. The gender makeup of the city was 51.7% male and 48.3% female.

=== 2000 census ===
As of the census of 2000, there were 802 people, 254 households, and 198 families living in the city. The population density was 1,302.0 inhabitants per square mile (502.7/km^{2}). There were 275 housing units at an average density of 446.5 per square mile (172.4/km^{2}). The racial makeup of the city was 74.94% White, 0.25% African American, 1.50% Native American, 0.12% Asian, 16.83% from other races, and 6.36% from two or more races. Hispanic or Latino of any race were 28.18% of the population.

There were 254 households, out of which 49.6% had children under the age of 18 living with them, 59.8% were married couples living together, 13.8% had a female householder with no husband present, and 21.7% were non-families. 17.7% of all households were made up of individuals, and 7.1% had someone living alone who was 65 years of age or older. The average household size was 3.16 and the average family size was 3.59.

In the city, the population was spread out, with 38.3% under the age of 18, 7.4% from 18 to 24, 30.4% from 25 to 44, 12.8% from 45 to 64, and 11.1% who were 65 years of age or older. The median age was 28 years. For every 100 females, there were 101.5 males. For every 100 females age 18 and over, there were 94.1 males.

The median income for a household in the city was $31,667, and the median income for a family was $34,063. Males had a median income of $30,278 versus $19,583 for females. The per capita income for the city was $11,865. About 16.1% of families and 18.4% of the population were below the poverty line, including 24.0% of those under age 18 and 7.1% of those age 65 or over.

== Education ==
Culver is served by the three-school Culver School District, including Culver High School.

== Infrastructure ==
=== Transportation ===
- Lake Billy Chinook Airport

== Notable people ==
- Rex T. Barber (1917–2001), World War II fighter pilot credited with shooting down Japanese Admiral Yamamoto's aircraft
- Boyd R. Overhulse (1909–1966), state legislator

== See also ==
- Graham Fire
