= 1920 United States presidential election in Oregon =

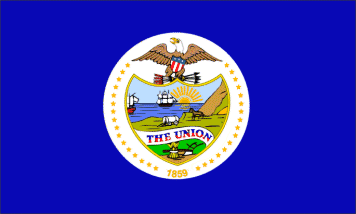
- November 2, 1920
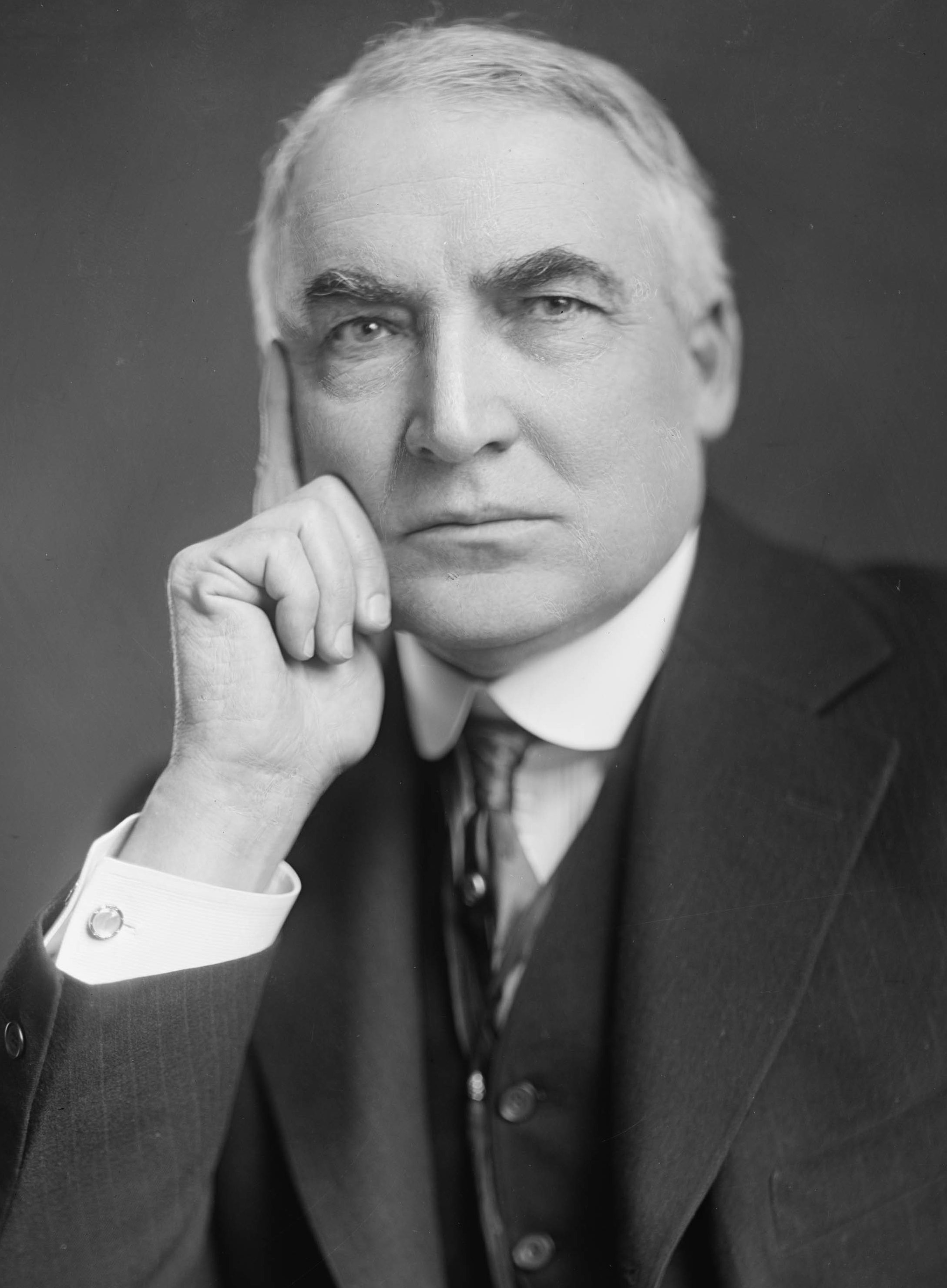

Nominee	Warren G. Harding	James M. Cox
Party	Republican	Democratic
Home state	Ohio	Ohio
Running mate	Calvin Coolidge	Franklin D. Roosevelt
Electoral vote	5	0
Popular vote	143,592	80,019
Percentage	60.20%	33.55%
County results
Harding
50–60%
60–70%
70–80%
President before election
Woodrow Wilson
Democratic
Elected President
Warren G. Harding
Republican

The 1920 United States presidential election in Oregon took place on November 2, 1920. All contemporary 48 states were part of the 1920 United States presidential election. Voters chose five electors to the Electoral College, who selected the president and vice president. This is the earliest presidential election in Oregon to include all 36 of the state's present counties.

Oregon had been in the 1900s solidified as a one-party Republican bastion, which it would remain at a Presidential level apart from the 1910s GOP split until Franklin D. Roosevelt rose to power in 1932, and apart from a very short New Deal interlude at state level until the “Revolution of 1954”. As of 1920, the state had not elected a Democratic Congressman since 1878, and between 1900 and 1954 Democratic representation in the Oregon legislature would never exceed fifteen percent except during the above-mentioned 1930s interlude, so that Republican primaries would become the chief mode of competition.

In 1916, when a powerful "peace vote" due to opposition to participation in World War I allowed Woodrow Wilson to sweep most of the West and Great Plains, Western Oregon’s largely Yankee population rejected Wilson’s progressivism as it had rejected the “free silver” politics of William Jennings Bryan in 1896. Thus, Oregon was the only Western state apart from South Dakota to back Charles Evans Hughes, although Ozark mountaineer-settled Eastern Oregon did vote for Wilson.

By the beginning of 1920 skyrocketing inflation and Wilson's focus upon his proposed League of Nations at the expense of domestic policy had helped make the incumbent President very unpopular – besides which Wilson also had major health problems that had left First Lady Edith effectively running the nation. Political unrest seen in the Palmer Raids and the "Red Scare" further added to the unpopularity of the Democratic Party, since this global political turmoil produced considerable fear of alien revolutionaries invading the country. Demand in the West for exclusion of Asian immigrants became even stronger than before.

Despite the fact that Oregon had been the only Western state to support Hughes and had not voted Democratic in a two-way race for over half a century, Cox did visit the state on September 14 to discuss Prohibition, saying that the League of Nations was an opportunity that would not be repeated (“This League or None”). Cox also said whilst touring the West that Prohibition should not be an issue as it would depend on enforcement rather than the actual passage of the Eighteenth amendment.

Oregon went with this tide, voting strongly for Republican nominee, Ohio Senator Warren G. Harding, over Democratic nominee Ohio Governor James M. Cox. Harding carried every county in the state; however, the conservatism of Western Oregon where most of the state's population resided meant that the swing toward the Republicans was extremely muted vis-à-vis any other Western State, and also that left-wing third parties did not have the impact they did in Washington State or some states in the Midwest. In fact, Oregon was the only state in the West, Plains or Upper Midwest except New Mexico where the swing against the Democrats was less than the national swing, and indeed it was Harding's weakest state north of the Missouri–Iowa border and west of the Great Lakes.

== Results ==
Presidential Candidate	Running Mate	Party	Electoral Vote (EV)	Popular Vote (PV)	
Warren G. Harding of Ohio	Calvin Coolidge	Republican	5	143,592	60.20%
James M. Cox	Franklin D. Roosevelt	Democratic	0	80,019	33.55%
Eugene V. Debs	Seymour Stedman	Socialist	0	9,801	4.11%
Aaron S. Watkins	Leigh Colvin	Prohibition	0	3,595	1.51%
William Wesley Cox	August Gillhaus	Industrial Labor	0	1,515	0.64%

=== Results by county ===
County	Warren G. Harding Republican		James M. Cox Democratic		Eugene V. Debs Socialist		Aaron S. Watkins Prohibition		William W. Cox Industrial Labor		Margin		Total votes cast
County	#	%	#	%	#	%	#	%	#	%	#	%	Total votes cast
Baker	3,495	58.63%	2,171	36.42%	179	3.00%	78	1.31%	38	0.64%	1,324	22.21%	5,961
Benton	3,752	66.25%	1,719	30.35%	86	1.52%	89	1.57%	17	0.30%	2,033	35.90%	5,663
Clackamas	6,928	59.52%	3,740	32.13%	706	6.07%	179	1.54%	86	0.74%	3,188	27.39%	11,639
Clatsop	3,498	61.40%	1,687	29.61%	397	6.97%	56	0.98%	59	1.04%	1,811	31.79%	5,697
Columbia	2,007	61.53%	970	29.74%	173	5.30%	58	1.78%	54	1.66%	1,037	31.79%	3,262
Coos	3,272	52.73%	2,297	37.02%	485	7.82%	96	1.55%	55	0.89%	975	15.71%	6,205
Crook	872	59.20%	528	35.85%	40	2.72%	23	1.56%	10	0.68%	344	23.35%	1,473
Curry	599	60.87%	280	28.46%	91	9.25%	10	1.02%	4	0.41%	319	32.42%	984
Deschutes	1,649	54.24%	1,072	35.26%	230	7.57%	45	1.48%	44	1.45%	577	18.98%	3,040
Douglas	4,402	60.18%	2,428	33.19%	334	4.57%	97	1.33%	54	0.74%	1,974	26.99%	7,315
Gilliam	821	60.59%	498	36.75%	18	1.33%	14	1.03%	4	0.30%	323	23.84%	1,355
Grant	1,310	68.59%	497	26.02%	77	4.03%	18	0.94%	8	0.42%	813	42.57%	1,910
Harney	1,026	63.26%	479	29.53%	76	4.69%	18	1.11%	23	1.42%	547	33.72%	1,622
Hood River	1,449	59.95%	761	31.49%	122	5.05%	63	2.61%	22	0.91%	688	28.47%	2,417
Jackson	4,382	59.81%	2,503	34.17%	247	3.37%	135	1.84%	59	0.81%	1,879	25.65%	7,326
Jefferson	623	61.56%	300	29.64%	38	3.75%	37	3.66%	14	1.38%	323	31.92%	1,012
Josephine	1,606	62.22%	819	31.73%	99	3.84%	34	1.32%	23	0.89%	787	30.49%	2,581
Klamath	2,742	70.18%	901	23.06%	164	4.20%	35	0.90%	65	1.66%	1,841	47.12%	3,907
Lake	1,136	72.08%	358	22.72%	59	3.74%	13	0.82%	10	0.63%	778	49.37%	1,576
Lane	7,714	61.97%	3,986	32.02%	457	3.67%	232	1.86%	58	0.47%	3,728	29.95%	12,447
Lincoln	1,229	59.09%	669	32.16%	140	6.73%	28	1.35%	14	0.67%	560	26.92%	2,080
Linn	4,693	56.17%	3,177	38.03%	264	3.16%	180	2.15%	41	0.49%	1,516	18.14%	8,355
Malheur	2,352	64.97%	1,075	29.70%	123	3.40%	47	1.30%	23	0.64%	1,277	35.28%	3,620
Marion	8,798	66.16%	3,831	28.81%	327	2.46%	287	2.16%	55	0.41%	4,967	37.35%	13,298
Morrow	1,186	68.75%	451	26.14%	57	3.30%	24	1.39%	7	0.41%	735	42.61%	1,725
Multnomah	44,806	58.06%	27,607	35.77%	3,488	4.52%	846	1.10%	427	0.55%	17,199	22.29%	77,174
Polk	2,709	58.97%	1,653	35.98%	123	2.68%	97	2.11%	12	0.26%	1,056	22.99%	4,594
Sherman	893	65.57%	423	31.06%	30	2.20%	13	0.95%	3	0.22%	470	34.51%	1,362
Tillamook	1,664	60.80%	828	30.25%	165	6.03%	49	1.79%	31	1.13%	836	30.54%	2,737
Umatilla	4,979	58.03%	3,255	37.94%	196	2.28%	108	1.26%	42	0.49%	1,724	20.09%	8,580
Union	2,844	56.65%	1,899	37.83%	173	3.45%	70	1.39%	34	0.68%	945	18.82%	5,020
Wallowa	1,612	60.28%	896	33.51%	100	3.74%	44	1.65%	22	0.82%	716	26.78%	2,674
Wasco	2,698	62.25%	1,434	33.09%	122	2.81%	58	1.34%	22	0.51%	1,264	29.16%	4,334
Washington	4,947	64.74%	2,262	29.60%	255	3.34%	133	1.74%	44	0.58%	2,685	35.14%	7,641
Wheeler	797	76.56%	212	20.37%	11	1.06%	16	1.54%	5	0.48%	585	56.20%	1,041
Yamhill	4,102	59.49%	2,353	34.13%	149	2.16%	265	3.84%	26	0.38%	1,749	25.37%	6,895
Totals	143,592	60.20%	80,019	33.55%	9,801	4.11%	3,595	1.51%	1,515	0.64%	63,573	26.65%	238,522

== See also ==
- United States presidential elections in Oregon
