= Horse Heaven, Washington =

Unincorporated community in Washington, United States

- Unincorporated community
- Location within Benton County, Washington
- Coordinates: 46°05′59″N 119°32′10″W
- Country: United States
- State: Washington
- County: Benton
- Elevation: 1,188 ft (362 m)
- Time zone: UTC-8 (Pacific (PST))
  - Summer (DST): UTC-7 (PDT)
- ZIP code: 99350
- Area code: 509
- GNIS feature ID: 1514778

Horse Heaven was an unincorporated community in Benton County, Washington, United States, located approximately 13 miles southeast of Prosser in Carter Canyon. The original community site has been abandoned, and most of it no longer remains.

== History ==
The community, originally known as Bedrock Spring, is located in the Horse Heaven Hills which, according to tradition, were named by James Gordon Kinney. The surrounding hills, once replete with wild horses, were frequently covered with "a perfect sea of the finest bunch-grass".

Horse Heaven had a post office from 1903 to 1932, before travel to nearby Prosser became more common and practical for conducting business.

== See also ==
- Horse Heaven Hills American Viticultural Area
- Horse Heaven, Oregon
