= Metolius, Oregon =

- City
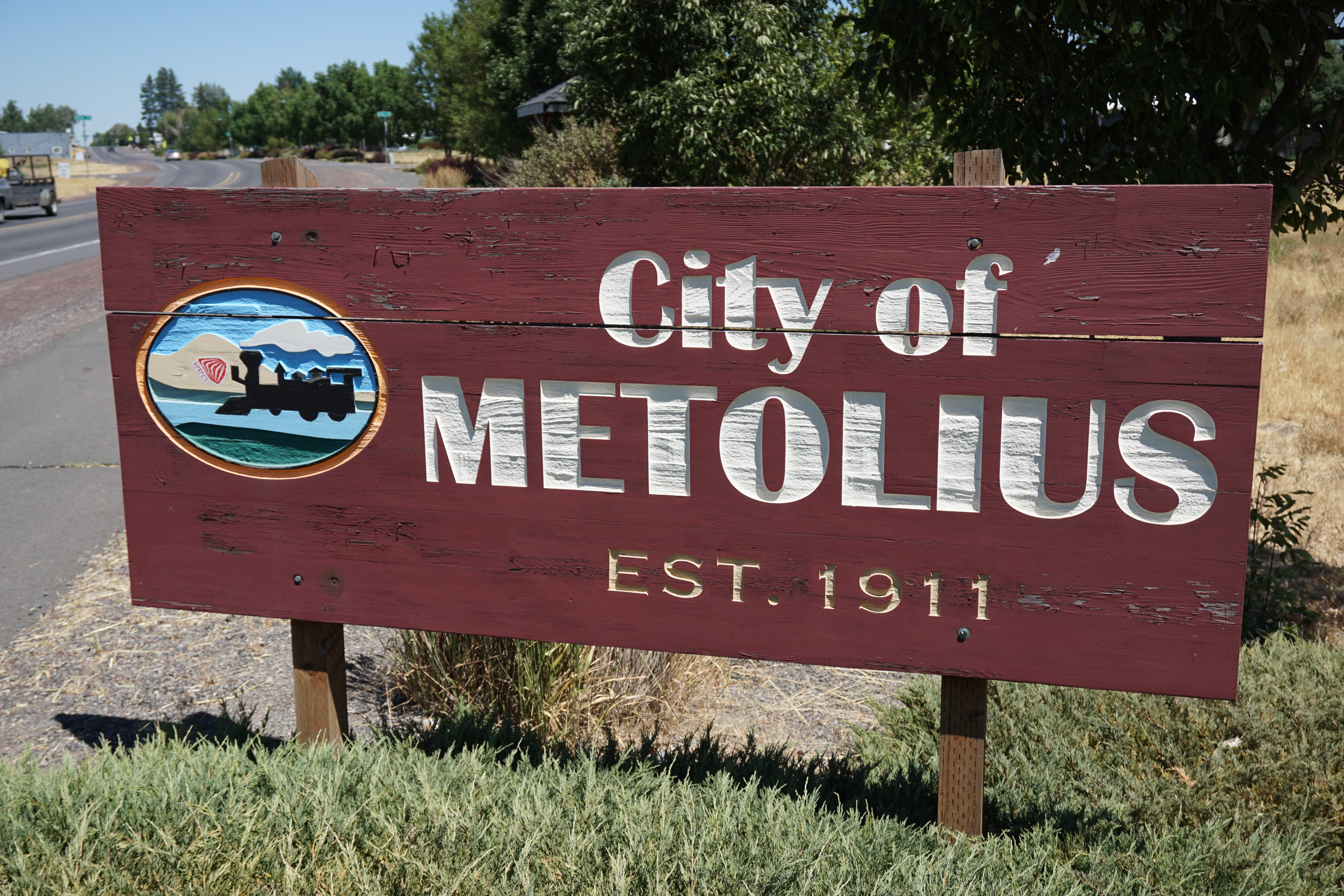
- City of Metolius Welcome Sign

- Location in Oregon
- Coordinates: 44°35′13″N 121°10′37″W
- Country: United States
- State: Oregon
- County: Jefferson
- Incorporated: 1913

Government
  - Mayor: Bill Reynolds

Area
  - Total: 0.48 sq mi (1.24 km^{2})
  - Land: 0.48 sq mi (1.24 km^{2})
  - Water: 0 sq mi (0.00 km^{2})
- Elevation: 2,530 ft (771.1 m)

Population (2020)
  - Total: 978
  - Density: 2,045.3/sq mi (789.71/km^{2})
- Time zone: UTC-8 (Pacific)
  - Summer (DST): UTC-7 (Pacific)
- ZIP code: 97741
- Area codes: 458 and 541
- FIPS code: 41-47750
- GNIS feature ID: 1146116

Metolius is a city in Jefferson County, Oregon, United States, named for the Metolius River, a nearby tributary of the Deschutes River. The name for both comes from the Warm Springs or Sahaptin word mitula, meaning white salmon and referring to a light colored Chinook salmon and not a whitefish. The population was 978 at the 2020 census.

== Geography ==
According to the United States Census Bureau, the city has a total area of 0.48 square miles (1.24 km^{2}), all land.

=== Climate ===
This region experiences warm and dry summers, with no average monthly temperatures above 71.6 °F (22.0 °C). According to the Köppen Climate Classification system, Metolius has a warm-summer Mediterranean climate, abbreviated "Csb" on climate maps.

== History ==
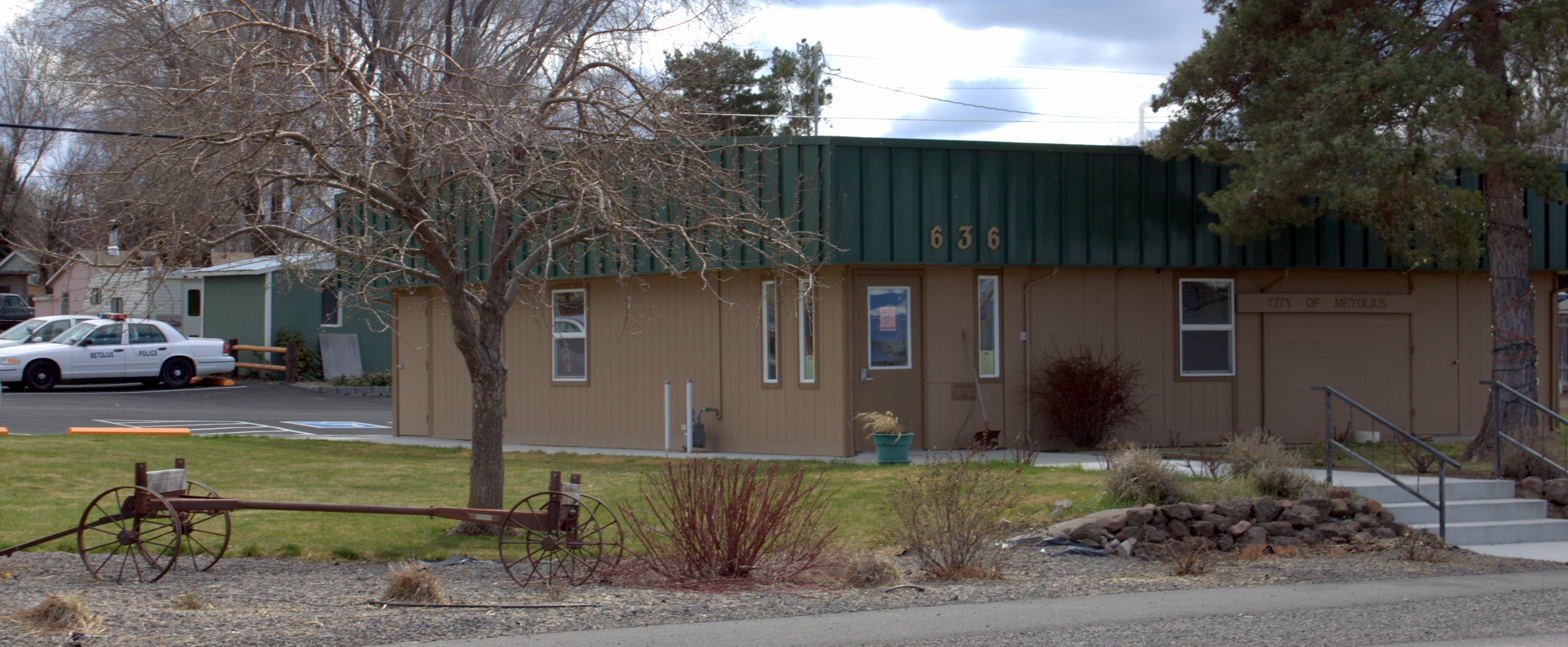
City Hall in Metolius

Metolius was founded in the early 1900s. The earliest records are from 1903 and written in German.

In February 1911 the Oregon Trunk Railroad built a depot, turntable and roundhouse in the town. The railroad was connected to Bend, Oregon. Railroad engines at the time needed water at regular intervals, and Metolius was chosen as a servicing spot. Electricity was provided in 1912 from a small dam at the Cove. A high school and grade school were built in 1913. The town continued to prosper during the war years and by 1917, the population was over 1,700, and the town had two banks, two newspapers, a flour mill, hotels, general stores, hardware stores and a railroad maintenance hub.

As railroad technology improved, maintenance stations were required less frequently and the Metolius shop was eliminated. Without the railroad base, the population of Metolius went into decline. A major fire in the 1920s destroyed most of the downtown buildings. Drought from 1924 to 1926 bankrupted many farmers, and the Great Depression almost finished the town off. By 1945 the population was down to about 45 people.

Prior to the 1940s, only dry farming existed in the area. An irrigation project diverting water from the Deschutes River boosted farming output and the town began to grow again. Water from the Deschutes river reaches the area through an extensive canal system. Farmers were now able to grow large crops, mostly mint, potatoes and hay. By 1960 over 3,000 railroad cars of fresh potatoes were loaded each year from the area. Four giant packing sheds stored fresh packed potatoes and delivered them onto railroad cars. A frozen French fry factory employed many workers year round. In 1968 a potato blight of nematodes ended large-scale potato production in the area. In 1973 the railroad closed its depot in Metolius. By 1990 almost all mint production had ended due to root rot. As of 2007, most agricultural production around Metolius is marginal.

In 1950 Metolius Elementary began to grow out of the 1913 high school building with a new gym and two classrooms. Four more classrooms were built in 1955 to teach the children of the influx of agricultural workers and construction workers building the three dams on the Deschutes River. In around 1963 the old high school was destroyed and the elementary was again expanded to include an office, a library and two more classrooms. Its last expansion occurred in 2000 with the addition of six new classrooms and a large modern library.

The first Spanish-speaking families began to settle in Metolius in the 1950s, drawn by field work hoeing, irrigating and harvesting as well as working in the potato sheds. Non-union mills converting scrap wood from lumber operations hired many more Spanish-speaking workers from Mexico. Now over 50% of the students at Metolius Elementary speak Spanish at home.

Around 1970, a fire in the city's Post Office led to the end of the ZIP code for the community, which thereafter shared the ZIP code of nearby Madras. However, in late 2003, city leaders enlisted the help of U.S. Representative Greg Walden to reclaim the code. Despite several attempts to start businesses, Metolius serves mainly as a bedroom community for Madras and other larger towns up to 40 miles (64 km) away. A prison is being built in Madras, and new homes are being built for its workers.

== Demographics ==
Historical population
Census	Pop.	Note	%±
1920	94		—
1930	38		−59.6%
1940	40		5.3%
1950	157		292.5%
1960	270		72.0%
1970	270		0.0%
1980	451		67.0%
1990	450		−0.2%
2000	635		41.1%
2010	710		11.8%
2020	978		37.7%

=== 2020 census ===
As of the 2020 census, Metolius had a population of 978. The median age was 34.8 years; 26.8% of residents were under the age of 18 and 16.2% of residents were 65 years of age or older. For every 100 females there were 100.8 males, and for every 100 females age 18 and over there were 101.1 males age 18 and over.

0% of residents lived in urban areas, while 100.0% lived in rural areas.

There were 338 households in Metolius, of which 37.6% had children under the age of 18 living in them. Of all households, 48.8% were married-couple households, 16.9% were households with a male householder and no spouse or partner present, and 22.5% were households with a female householder and no spouse or partner present. About 18.9% of all households were made up of individuals and 9.7% had someone living alone who was 65 years of age or older.

There were 360 housing units, of which 6.1% were vacant. Among occupied housing units, 69.2% were owner-occupied and 30.8% were renter-occupied. The homeowner vacancy rate was 1.7% and the rental vacancy rate was 4.6%.

Racial composition as of the 2020 census
Race	Number	Percent
White	625	63.9%
Black or African American	5	0.5%
American Indian and Alaska Native	19	1.9%
Asian	8	0.8%
Native Hawaiian and Other Pacific Islander	3	0.3%
Some other race	164	16.8%
Two or more races	154	15.7%
Hispanic or Latino (of any race)	368	37.6%

=== 2010 census ===
As of the census of 2010, there were 710 people, 275 households, and 190 families residing in the city. The population density was 1,479.2 inhabitants per square mile (571.1/km^{2}). There were 297 housing units at an average density of 618.8 per square mile (238.9/km^{2}). The racial makeup of the city was 75.6% White, 1.0% African American, 3.8% Native American, 0.6% Asian, 0.1% Pacific Islander, 14.8% from other races, and 4.1% from two or more races. Hispanic or Latino of any race were 23.7% of the population.

There were 275 households, of which 37.8% had children under the age of 18 living with them, 49.5% were married couples living together, 13.8% had a female householder with no husband present, 5.8% had a male householder with no wife present, and 30.9% were non-families. 23.6% of all households were made up of individuals, and 8% had someone living alone who was 65 years of age or older. The average household size was 2.58 and the average family size was 3.03.

The median age in the city was 38.6 years. 26.2% of residents were under the age of 18; 7.3% were between the ages of 18 and 24; 25.7% were from 25 to 44; 31% were from 45 to 64; and 9.7% were 65 years of age or older. The gender makeup of the city was 50.0% male and 50.0% female.

=== 2000 census ===
As of the census of 2000, there were 635 people, 214 households, and 161 families residing in the city. The population density was 1,549.7 inhabitants per square mile (598.3/km^{2}). There were 220 housing units at an average density of 536.9 per square mile (207.3/km^{2}). The racial makeup of the city was 77.17% White, 0.16% African American, 2.05% Native American, 0.63% Asian, 13.23% from other races, and 6.77% from two or more races. Hispanic or Latino of any race were 22.68% of the population.

There were 214 households, out of which 40.7% had children under the age of 18 living with them, 57.0% were married couples living together, 13.1% had a female householder with no husband present, and 24.3% were non-families. 21.0% of all households were made up of individuals, and 7.9% had someone living alone who was 65 years of age or older. The average household size was 2.97 and the average family size was 3.41.

In the city, the population was spread out, with 35.3% under the age of 18, 6.6% from 18 to 24, 31.5% from 25 to 44, 15.4% from 45 to 64, and 11.2% who were 65 years of age or older. The median age was 30 years. For every 100 females, there were 106.2 males. For every 100 females age 18 and over, there were 99.5 males.

The median income for a household in the city was $32,375, and the median income for a family was $34,028. Males had a median income of $30,893 versus $21,607 for females. The per capita income for the city was $11,963. About 14.0% of families and 16.6% of the population were below the poverty line, including 18.3% of those under age 18 and 15.0% of those age 65 or over.
