= Ashwood, Oregon =

- Unincorporated community
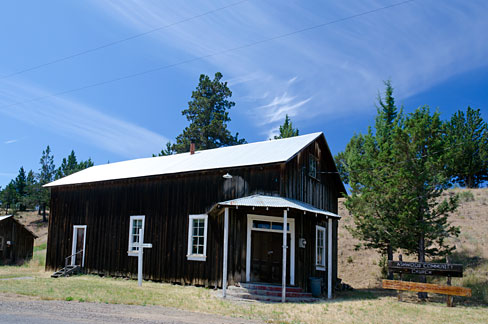
- The community's church

- Location within Oregon Location within the United States
- Coordinates: 44°44′01″N 120°45′16″W
- Country: United States
- State: Oregon
- County: Jefferson
- Named for: Ash Butte and early settler Whitfield T. Wood
- Elevation: 2,526 ft (770 m)
- Time zone: UTC-8 (PST)
  - Summer (DST): UTC-7 (PDT)
- ZIP code: 97711
- Area code: 541
- Coordinates and elevation from United States Geological Survey

Ashwood is a ghost town in Jefferson County, Oregon, United States, 32 miles (51 km) northeast of Madras.

Ashwood was named for its proximity to Ash Butte, a butte with volcanic ash deposits on its sides, and to honor Whitfield T. Wood, who settled in the area in the 1870s. Ashwood post office was established in 1898.

The Ashwood area was first used by the Native American Sahaptin and Northern Paiute people. After the Sahaptin were forced to move to the Warm Springs Indian Reservation in the 1850s, and the Northern Paiute were defeated in the 1870s, settlers moved into the area to raise cattle and sheep. Sheep ranching became an important local industry by 1900 because of the availability of the railroad in nearby Shaniko that facilitated the shipping of wool. Ashwood became a gold- and silver-mining boomtown in the 1910s. The Oregon King Mine was an important mine that was established during the early boom period. The minerals soon began to play out, however, and local residents turned back to ranching and agriculture as the mainstays of their economy.

Ashwood is popular with rockhounds, as the area has an abundance of petrified wood, jasper, and thundereggs—Oregon's state rock.

== Climate ==
This region experiences warm (but not hot) and dry summers, with no average monthly temperatures above 80 °F. According to the Köppen Climate Classification system, Ashwood has a warm-summer Mediterranean climate, abbreviated "Csb" on climate maps.

== Gallery ==
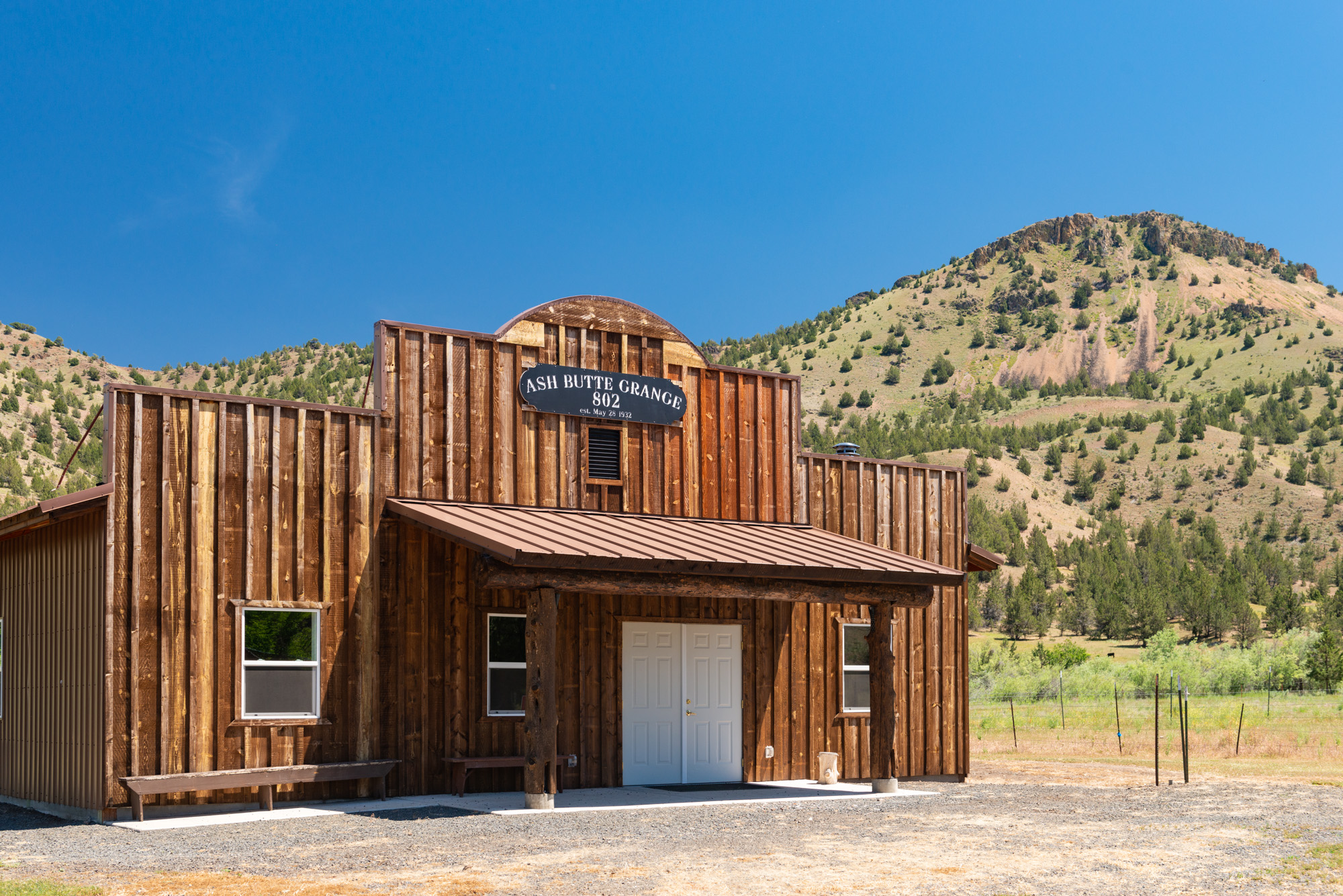
Ash Butte Grange #802

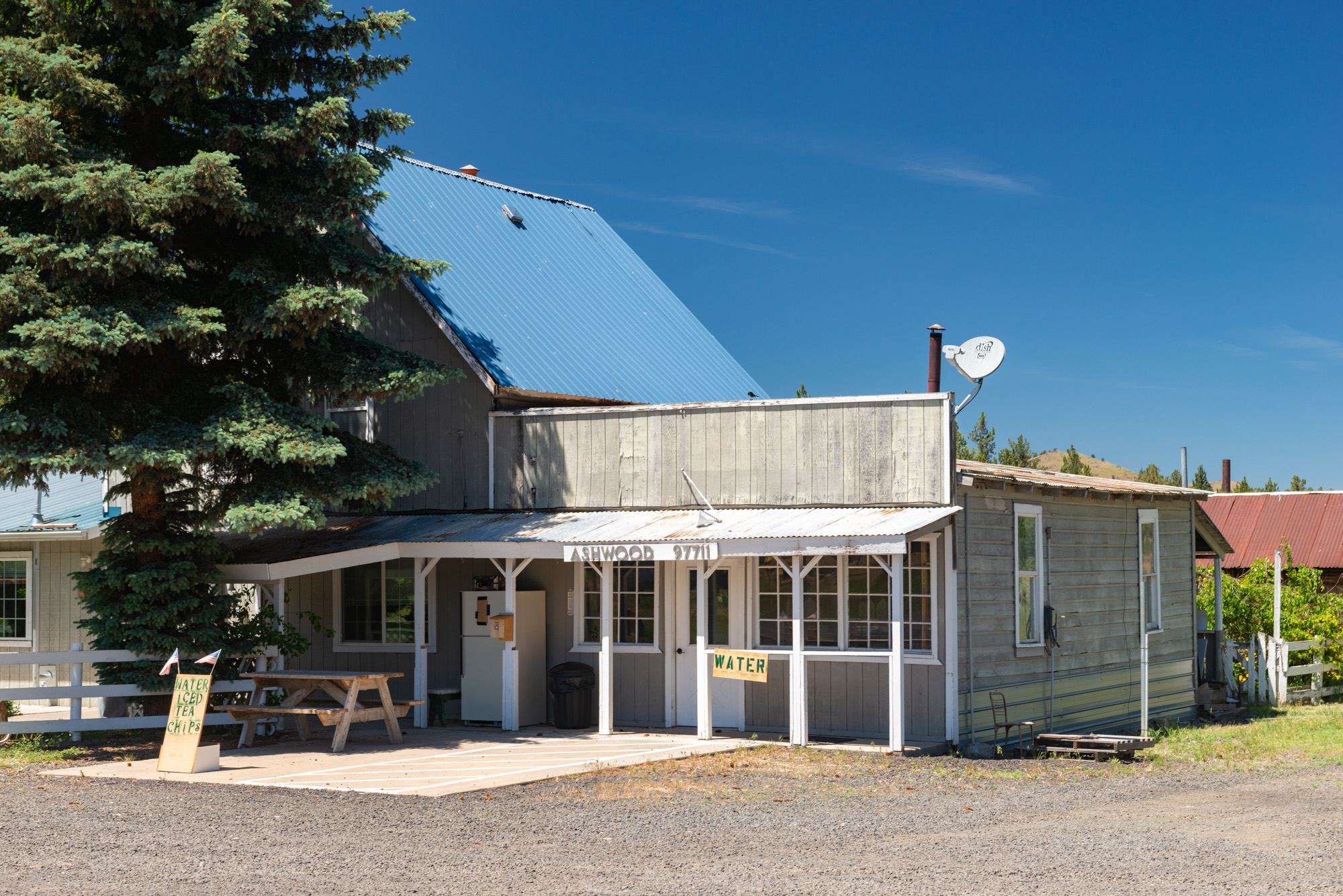
Post office, Ashwood, 97711

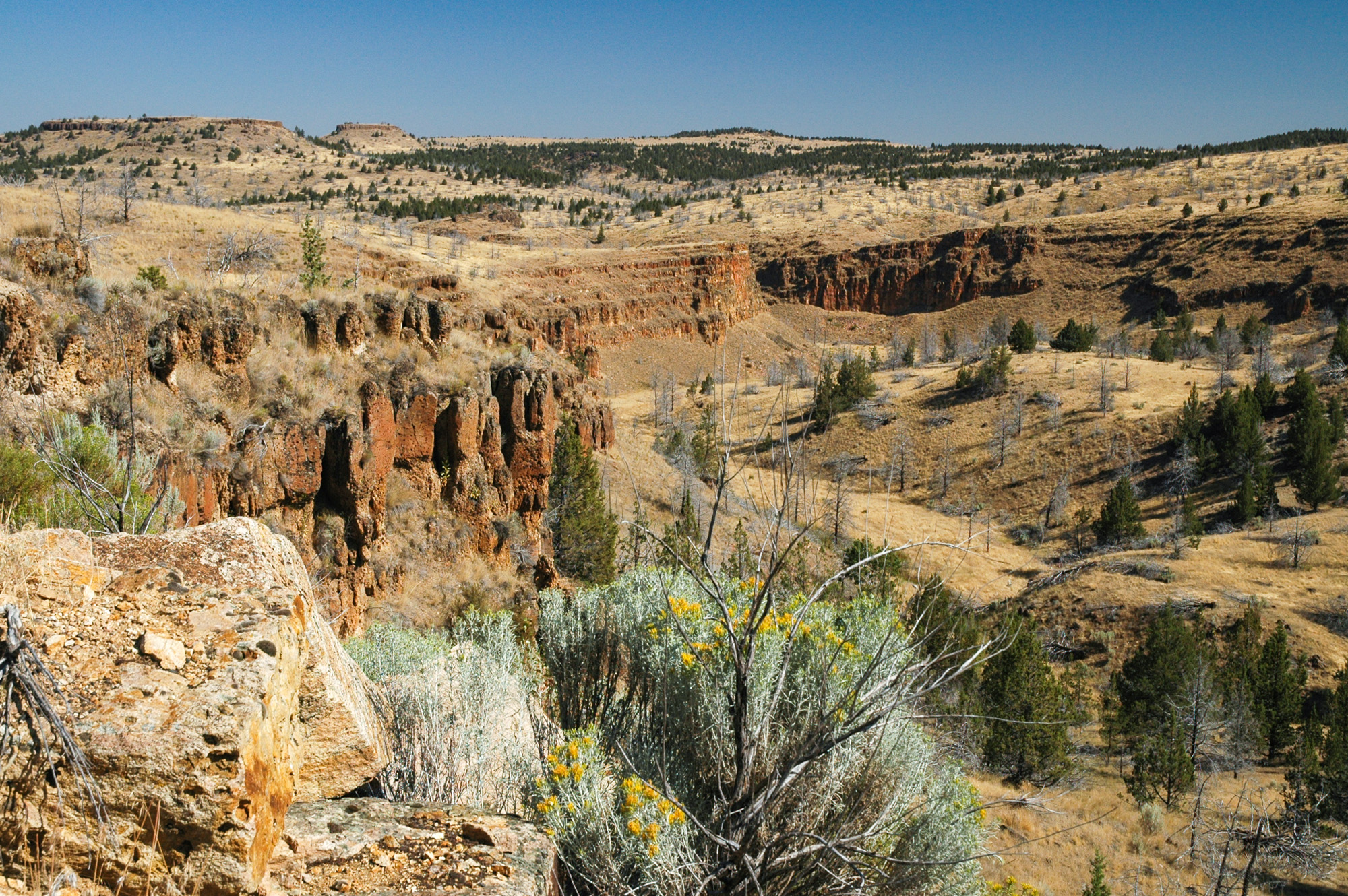
Rock formations near Ashwood

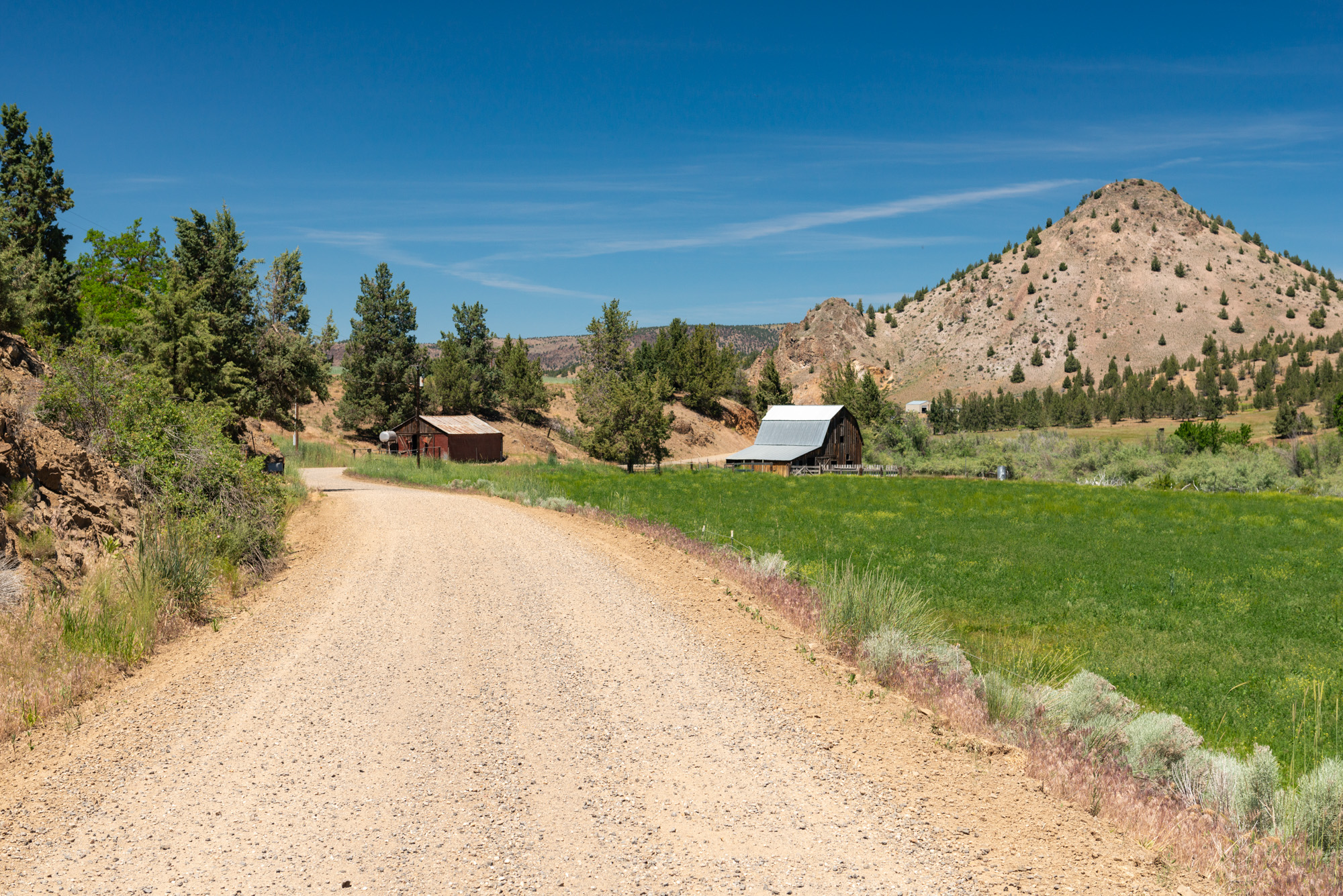
Farm on Trout Creek Rd., Ashwood

== See also ==
- List of ghost towns in Oregon none
