= Jefferson County, Oregon =

County in Oregon, United States

- County
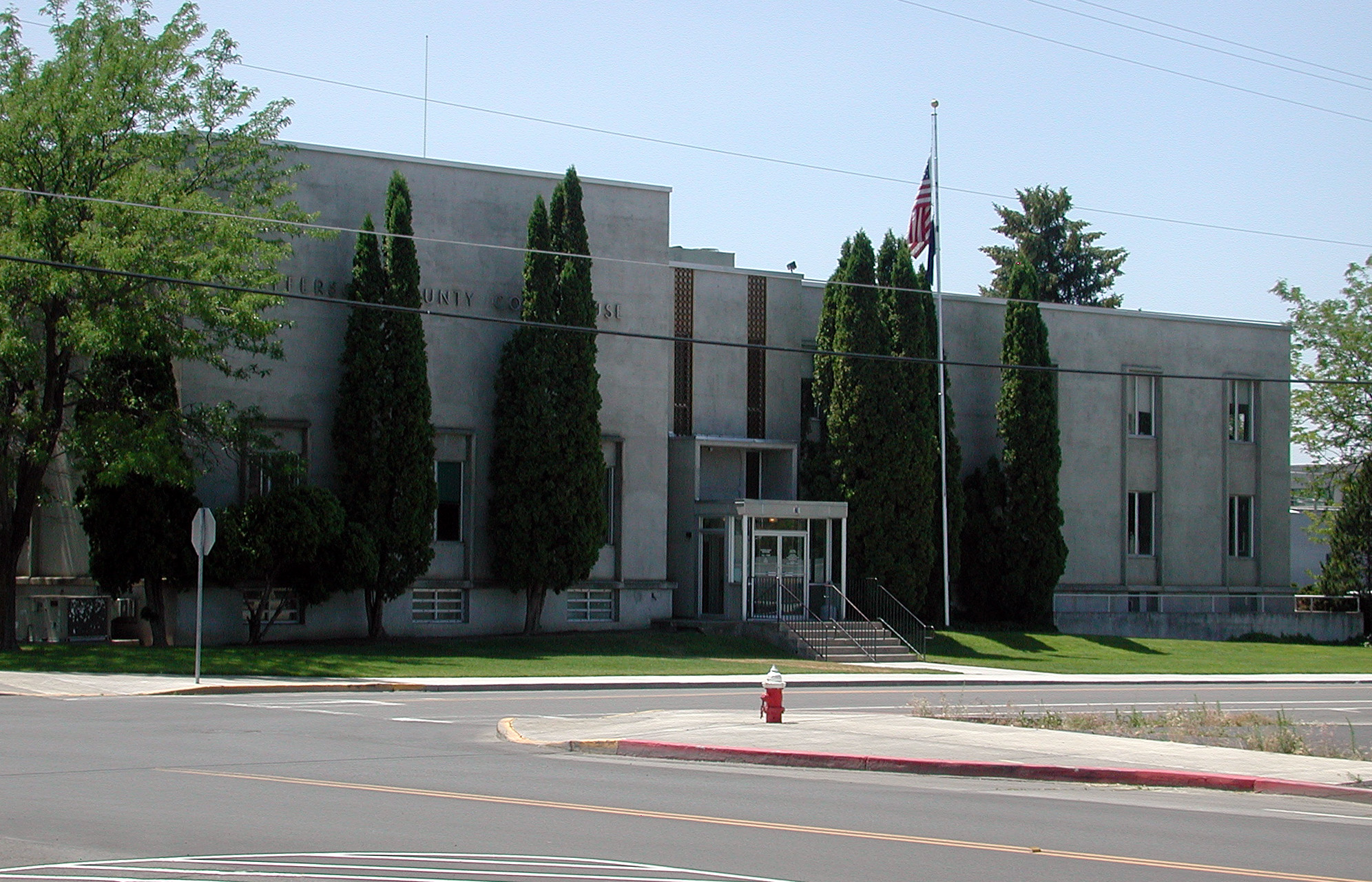
- Jefferson County Courthouse in Madras

- Location within the U.S. state of Oregon
- Coordinates: 44°38′N 121°10′W
- Country: United States
- State: Oregon
- Founded: December 12, 1914
- Named for: Mount Jefferson
- Seat: Madras
- Largest city: Madras

Area
  - Total: 1,791 sq mi (4,640 km^{2})
  - Land: 1,781 sq mi (4,610 km^{2})
  - Water: 10 sq mi (26 km^{2}) 0.6%

Population (2020)
  - Total: 24,502
  - Estimate (2025): 25,740 ▲
  - Density: 12/sq mi (4.6/km^{2})
- Time zone: UTC−8 (Pacific)
  - Summer (DST): UTC−7 (PDT)
- Congressional districts: 2nd, 5th
- Website: www.jeffersoncountyor.gov

Jefferson County is one of the 36 counties in the U.S. state of Oregon. At the 2020 census, the population was 24,502. The county seat is Madras. The county is named after Mount Jefferson, the second tallest mountain in Oregon.

== History ==
Jefferson County was created on December 12, 1914, from a portion of Crook County. The county owes much of its agricultural prosperity to the railroad, which links Madras with the Columbia River, and was completed in 1911, and to the development of irrigation projects in the late 1930s. The railroad was completed despite constant feuds and battles between two lines working on opposite sides of the Deschutes River.

Madras was incorporated in 1911, and has been the permanent county seat since a general election in 1916. The first (temporary) county seat was Culver, which was selected by a three-man commission appointed by the governor. Due to repeated tie votes over several days (with one vote each cast for Culver, Metolius and Madras). The deadlock was eventually broken by allowing the Metolius Commissioner to post the tie-breaker, by voting for Culver.

Rapid development in adjacent Deschutes County during the 1990s had farmers in Jefferson County concerned that they might be priced out of their own farmlands, which could be replaced by destination resorts, golf courses and other amenities for recent arrivals.

== Geography ==
Map of Jefferson County

According to the United States Census Bureau, the county has a total area of 1,791 square miles (4,640 km^{2}), of which 1,781 square miles (4,610 km^{2}) is land and 10 square miles (26 km^{2}) (0.6%) is water.

=== Adjacent counties ===
- Marion County (northwest)
- Wasco County (north)
- Wheeler County (east)
- Crook County (south)
- Deschutes County (south)
- Linn County (west)

=== National protected areas ===
- Crooked River National Grassland
- Deschutes National Forest (part)
- Mount Hood National Forest (part)
- Willamette National Forest (part)

== Demographics ==
Historical population
Census	Pop.	Note	%±
1920	3,211		—
1930	2,291		−28.7%
1940	2,042		−10.9%
1950	5,536		171.1%
1960	7,130		28.8%
1970	8,548		19.9%
1980	11,599		35.7%
1990	13,676		17.9%
2000	19,009		39.0%
2010	21,720		14.3%
2020	24,502		12.8%
2025 (est.)	25,740	▲	5.1%
U.S. Decennial Census; 1790–1960 1900–1990; 1990–2000 2010–2020

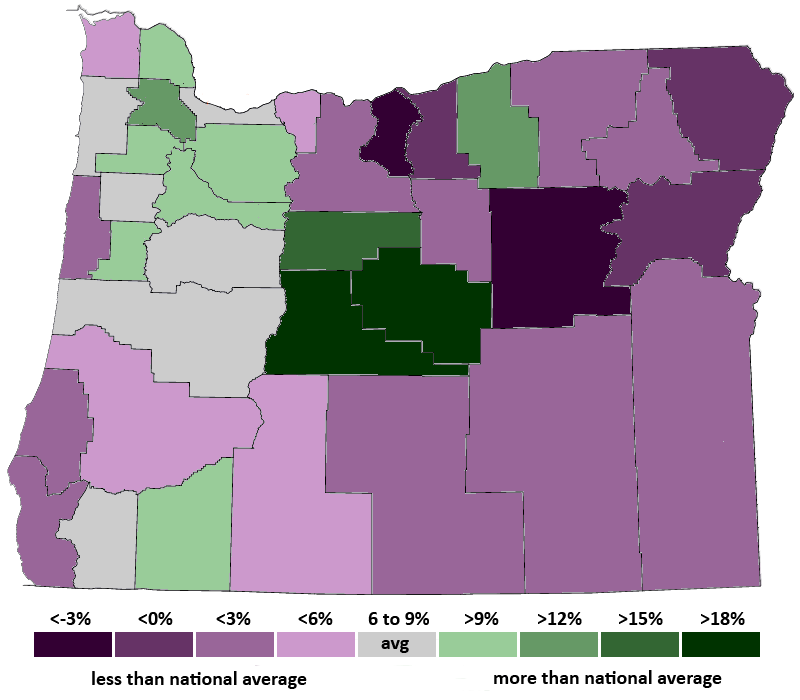
From 2000 to 2007, Jefferson County's population grew by 15.9%, more than twice the national average. It was the third fastest growing county in the state, after neighboring Deschutes and Crook counties.

=== 2020 census ===
Jefferson County, Oregon – Racial and ethnic composition Note: the US Census treats Hispanic/Latino as an ethnic category. This table excludes Latinos from the racial categories and assigns them to a separate category. Hispanics/Latinos may be of any race.
Race / Ethnicity (NH = Non-Hispanic)	Pop 1980	Pop 1990	Pop 2000	Pop 2010	Pop 2020	% 1980	% 1990	% 2000	% 2010	% 2020
White alone (NH)	8,844	9,590	12,335	13,429	15,005	76.25%	70.12%	64.89%	61.83%	61.24%
Black or African American alone (NH)	35	20	43	117	134	0.30%	0.15%	0.23%	0.54%	0.55%
Native American or Alaska Native alone (NH)	1,939	2,551	2,788	3,360	2,981	16.72%	18.65%	14.67%	15.47%	12.17%
Asian alone (NH)	46	62	54	83	131	0.40%	0.45%	0.28%	0.38%	0.53%
Native Hawaiian or Pacific Islander alone (NH)	x	x	28	23	18	x	x	0.15%	0.11%	0.07%
Other race alone (NH)	0	5	11	34	66	0.00%	0.04%	0.06%	0.16%	0.27%
Mixed race or Multiracial (NH)	x	x	378	479	1,165	x	x	1.99%	2.21%	4.75%
Hispanic or Latino (any race)	735	1,448	3,372	4,195	5,002	6.34%	10.59%	17.74%	19.31%	20.41%
Total	11,599	13,676	19,009	21,720	24,502	100.00%	100.00%	100.00%	100.00%	100.00%

=== American Community Survey 2025 data ===
The United States Census Bureau estimated that in 2025, Jefferson County’s population was 25.740. It was also estimated that the county's population was 60,00% Non-Hispanic White, 23,38% Hispanic or Latino, 0,78% Non-Hispanic Black, 0,65% Asian, 10,73% Native American, 0,16% Pacific Islander, and 4,30% Multiracial.

Total	Population	Percentage
Non-Hispanic White	15.443	60,00%
Hispanic or Latino	6.018	23,38%
Non-Hispanic Black	200	0,78%
Asian	168	0,65%
Native American	2.763	10,73%
Pacific Islander	40	0,16%
Non-Hispanic Multiracial	1.108	4,30%

As of the 2020 census, the county had a population of 24,502. Of the residents, 22.5% were under the age of 18 and 20.6% were 65 years of age or older; the median age was 41.5 years. For every 100 females there were 107.0 males, and for every 100 females age 18 and over there were 107.3 males. 33.0% of residents lived in urban areas and 67.0% lived in rural areas.

The racial makeup of the county was 65.3% White, 0.6% Black or African American, 13.6% American Indian and Alaska Native, 0.6% Asian, 0.1% Native Hawaiian and Pacific Islander, 10.0% from some other race, and 9.8% from two or more races. Hispanic or Latino residents of any race comprised 20.4% of the population.

There were 8,680 households in the county, of which 31.4% had children under the age of 18 living with them and 23.0% had a female householder with no spouse or partner present. About 22.0% of all households were made up of individuals and 11.2% had someone living alone who was 65 years of age or older.

There were 10,250 housing units, of which 15.3% were vacant. Among occupied housing units, 71.5% were owner-occupied and 28.5% were renter-occupied. The homeowner vacancy rate was 1.4% and the rental vacancy rate was 4.3%.

=== 2010 census ===
As of the 2010 census, there were 21,720 people, 7,790 households and 5,646 families living in the county. The population density was 12.2 per square mile (4.7/km^{2}). There were 9,815 housing units at an average density of 5.5 per square mile (2.1/km^{2}). The racial make-up was 69.0% white, 16.9% American Indian, 0.6% black or African American, 0.4% Asian, 0.1% Pacific islander, 9.1% from other races, and 3.8% from two or more races. Those of Hispanic or Latino origin made up 19.3% of the population. In terms of ancestry, 15.0% were German, 9.4% were Irish, 8.3% were English, and 4.9% were American.

Of the 7,790 households, 34.0% had children under the age of 18 living with them, 53.6% were married couples living together, 12.6% had a female householder with no husband present, 27.5% were non-families, and 22.2% of all households were made up of individuals. The average household size was 2.68 and the average family size was 3.11. The median age was 39.6 years.

The median household income was $41,425 and the median family income was $48,818. Males had a median income of $37,370 and females $30,047. The per capita income was $20,009. About 13.5% of families and 20.1% of the population were below the poverty line, including 33.6% of those under age 18 and 6.5% of those age 65 or over.

=== 2000 census ===
As of the 2000 census, there were 19,009 people, 6,727 households and 5,166 families living in the county. The population density was 11 per square mile (4.2/km^{2}). There were 8,319 housing units at an average density of 5 per square mile (1.9/km^{2}). The racial make-up was 68.98% White, 0.26% Black or African American, 15.68% Native American, 0.30% Asian, 0.22% Pacific Islander, 11.32% from other races, and 3.23% from two or more races. 17.74% of the population were Hispanic or Latino of any race. 13.6% were of German, 9.5% English, 8.7% American and 5.3% Irish ancestry. 82.2% spoke English, 15.5% Spanish and 1.0% Sahaptian as their first language.

There were 6,727 households, of which 35.60% had children under the age of 18 living with them, 60.50% were married couples living together, 10.50% had a female householder with no husband present, and 23.20% were non-families. 18.60% of all households were made up of individuals, and 6.90% had someone living alone who was 65 years of age or older. The average household size was 2.80 and the average family size was 3.16.

29.80% of the population were under the age of 18, 7.70% from 18 to 24, 26.90% from 25 to 44, 23.20% from 45 to 64, and 12.40% who were 65 years of age or older. The median age was 35 years. For every 100 females there were 101.90 males. For every 100 females age 18 and over, there were 100.80 males.

The median household income was $35,853 and the median family income was $39,151. Males had a median income of $31,126 and females $22,086s. The per capita income was $15,675. About 10.40% of families and 14.60% of the population were below the poverty line, including 22.20% of those under age 18 and 5.90% of those age 65 or over.

== Communities ==
=== Cities ===
- Culver
- Madras (county seat)
- Metolius

=== Census-designated places ===
- Camp Sherman
- Crooked River Ranch
- Warm Springs

=== Unincorporated communities ===
- Ashwood
- Kilts
- Gateway
- Geneva
- Grandview
- Grizzly
- Horse Heaven
- Opal City
- Willowdale

== Politics ==
United States presidential election results for Jefferson County, Oregon
Year	Republican		Democratic		Third party(ies)	
Year	No.	%	No.	%	No.	%
1916	581	36.13%	904	56.22%	123	7.65%
1920	623	61.56%	300	29.64%	89	8.79%
1924	374	39.00%	242	25.23%	343	35.77%
1928	481	59.31%	308	37.98%	22	2.71%
1932	253	33.03%	477	62.27%	36	4.70%
1936	253	31.51%	514	64.01%	36	4.48%
1940	423	47.21%	467	52.12%	6	0.67%
1944	419	57.95%	297	41.08%	7	0.97%
1948	622	50.69%	559	45.56%	46	3.75%
1952	1,488	67.12%	723	32.61%	6	0.27%
1956	1,356	54.83%	1,117	45.17%	0	0.00%
1960	1,413	53.75%	1,214	46.18%	2	0.08%
1964	1,197	40.74%	1,739	59.19%	2	0.07%
1968	1,669	55.26%	1,160	38.41%	191	6.32%
1972	1,816	56.38%	1,229	38.16%	176	5.46%
1976	1,810	47.92%	1,769	46.84%	198	5.24%
1980	2,523	53.26%	1,654	34.92%	560	11.82%
1984	3,283	62.94%	1,920	36.81%	13	0.25%
1988	2,509	50.23%	2,346	46.97%	140	2.80%
1992	1,962	33.22%	2,161	36.59%	1,783	30.19%
1996	2,634	42.52%	2,555	41.24%	1,006	16.24%
2000	3,838	55.65%	2,681	38.87%	378	5.48%
2004	4,762	58.68%	3,243	39.96%	110	1.36%
2008	4,402	52.92%	3,682	44.27%	234	2.81%
2012	4,642	56.78%	3,301	40.38%	232	2.84%
2016	5,483	57.97%	2,980	31.50%	996	10.53%
2020	7,189	60.35%	4,393	36.88%	331	2.78%
2024	7,454	63.44%	3,941	33.54%	355	3.02%

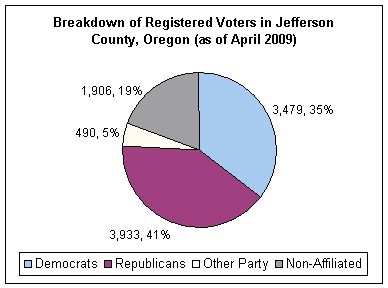
Political orientations in Jefferson County, Oregon (2009)

Though Jefferson County is located in central Oregon, politically it falls in line with the eastern side of the state. The majority of registered voters who are part of a political party in Jefferson County, as well as most counties in eastern Oregon, are members of the Republican Party. No Democrat has won the majority of the votes in Jefferson County since Lyndon B. Johnson in 1964; the last Democrat to carry the county in a presidential election was Bill Clinton in 1992. In the 2008 presidential election, 51.47% of Jefferson County voters voted for Republican John McCain, while 43.05% voted for Democrat Barack Obama and 5.46% of voters either voted for a Third Party candidate or wrote in a candidate. These numbers show a small shift towards the Democratic candidate as well as a Third Party candidate when compared to the 2004 presidential election, in which 58.7% of Jefferson Country voters voted for George W. Bush, while 40% voted for John Kerry, and 1.3% of voters either voted for a Third Party candidate or a write-in candidate.

== Economy ==
Agriculture is the predominant source of income in the county, with vegetable, grass and flower seeds, garlic, mint and sugar beets cultivated on some 60,000 acres (240 km^{2}) of irrigated land. Jefferson County also has vast rangelands and until 2016 had an industrial base related to forest products. The Warm Springs Forest Products Industry, a multimillion-dollar complex owned by the Confederated Tribes of Warm Springs — partially located in the northwestern corner of the county — was the single biggest industry. With 300 days of sunshine and a low yearly rainfall, fishing, hunting, camping, boating, water-skiing and rock hunting are major tourist activities.

The major landowners in the county are the Forest Service, which manages National Forest System Lands the comprise 24% of the lands within the county boundaries, and the Confederated Tribes of Warm Springs-Warm Springs Reservation, which owns and manages 21% of the lands within the county boundaries.

== Education ==
School districts include:

- Ashwood School District 8
- Black Butte School District 41
- Culver School District 4
- Jefferson County School District 509J
- Redmond School District 2J

Jefferson County is in the boundary of Central Oregon Community College.

== See also ==
- Confederated Tribes of Warm Springs
- Warm Springs Reservation, Oregon
- National Register of Historic Places listings in Jefferson County, Oregon
