= Deschutes National Forest =

National forest in the U.S. state of Oregon

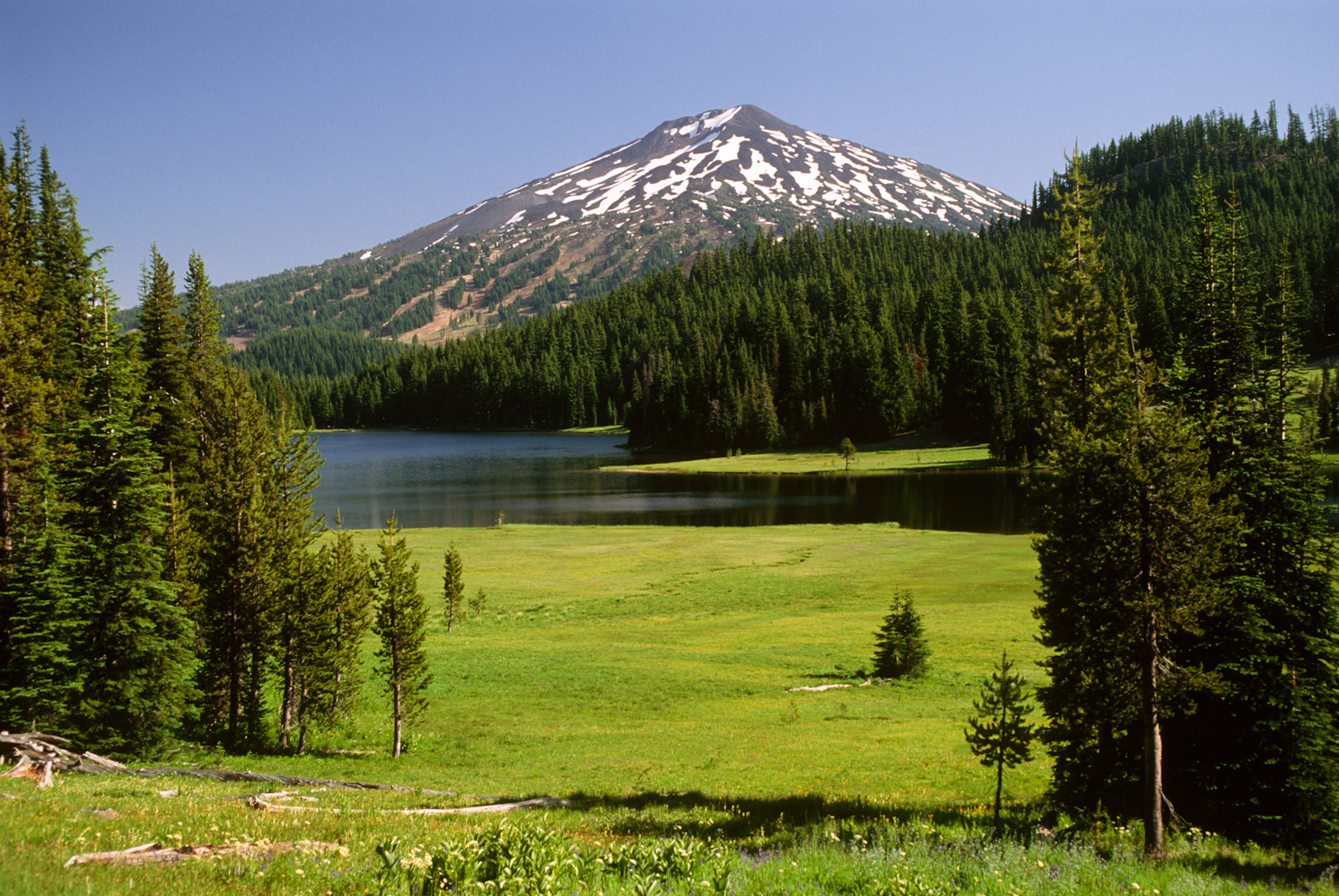
- Todd Lake area and view of Mount Bachelor

- Location within the United States
- Location: Oregon, USA
- Nearest city: Bend, Oregon
- Coordinates: 44°00′00″N 121°30′00″W
- Area: 1,596,900 acres (6,462 km^{2})
- Established: July 1, 1908
- Visitors: 3,162,000 (in 2006)
- Governing body: U.S. Forest Service
- Website: Deschutes National Forest

The Deschutes National Forest is a United States national forest (NF) located in Central Oregon, in parts of Deschutes, Klamath, Lake, and Jefferson counties. It was established in 1908, with border changes following in 1911 and 1915. The forest now encompasses almost 1.6 million acres (6,500 km^{2}) along the east side of the Cascade Range. The forest is bordered to the south by the Fremont–Winema NF, to the southwest by the Umpqua NF, and to the west by the Willamette NF.

The Deschutes NF hosts official preservation areas, various biology, and recreational activities.

== History ==
The Deschutes National Forest was established in 1908 from parts of the Blue Mountains, Cascade, and Fremont national forests (NFs). In 1911, parts of the Deschutes were split off to form the Ochoco and Paulina NFs, with parts of the Cascade and Oregon NFs being added to the Deschutes; in 1915, the Paulina NF was absorbed back into the Deschutes.

From 1964 to 1966, NASA used the park's Newberry Volcano as a training location for Apollo astronauts. In 1990, the area around the volcano was designated as a national monument.

== Official areas ==
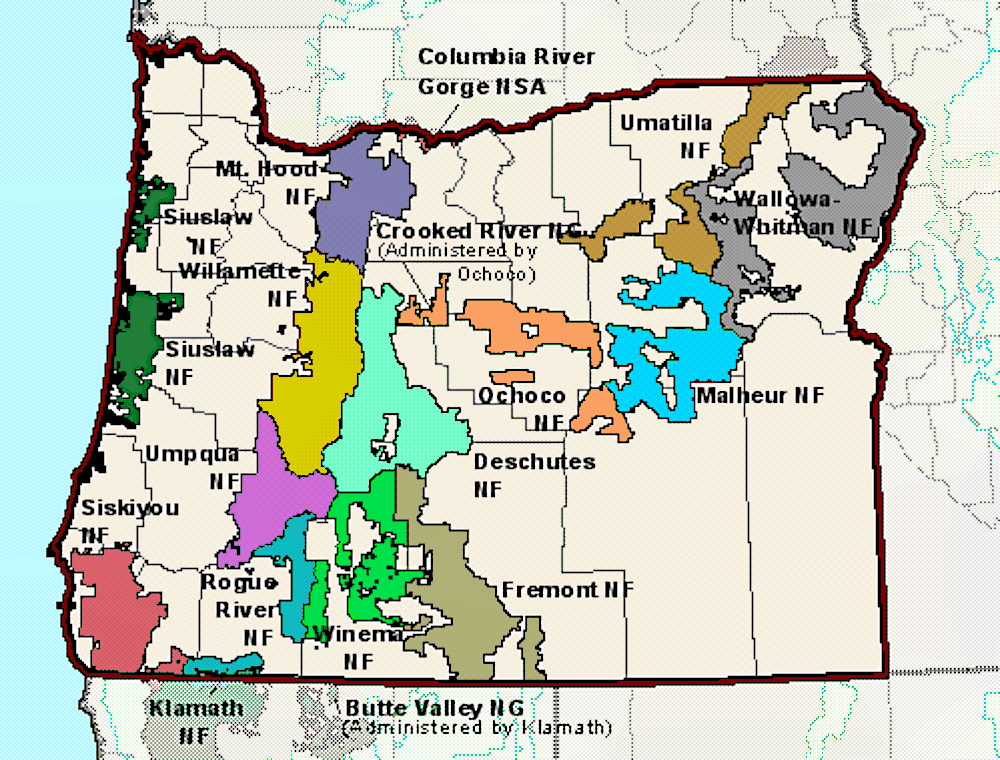
Map of Oregon national forests: Deschutes in cyan

The forest covers a total of 1.6 million acres (6,462 square kilometres). Its headquarters are located in Bend, Oregon. There are local ranger district offices in Bend, Crescent, and Sisters. In addition to the Newberry National Volcanic Monument, the park overlays six National Wild and Scenic Rivers, the Metolius Preserve, and the Oregon Cascade Recreation Area.

There are five wilderness areas officially designated by the National Wilderness Preservation System which overlap the forest and are shared administratively with neighboring NFs.

- Mount Jefferson Wilderness (north; partly in Mount Hood NF, mostly in Willamette NF)
- Mount Washington Wilderness (northwest; mostly in Willamette NF)
- Three Sisters Wilderness (west; mostly in Willamette NF)
- Diamond Peak Wilderness (southwest; partly in Willamette NF)
- Mount Thielsen Wilderness (south; 40.36% in Umpqua NF and 47% in Winema NF)

== Geology ==
About 7,700 years ago, the eruption of Mount Mazama (forming Crater Lake, south of the forest) covered the existing soil with about 3 feet (0.9 meters) of volcanic ash and pumice, forming a topsoil fairly inhospitable to plants, though with the underlying soil still being accessible to roots.

The forest contains over 400 caves. The Newberry volcano area contains cinder cones, lava flows, and lava tubes.

The highest point in the park is Paulina Peak, located south of Paulina Lake within the Newberry National Volcanic Monument.

== Ecology ==
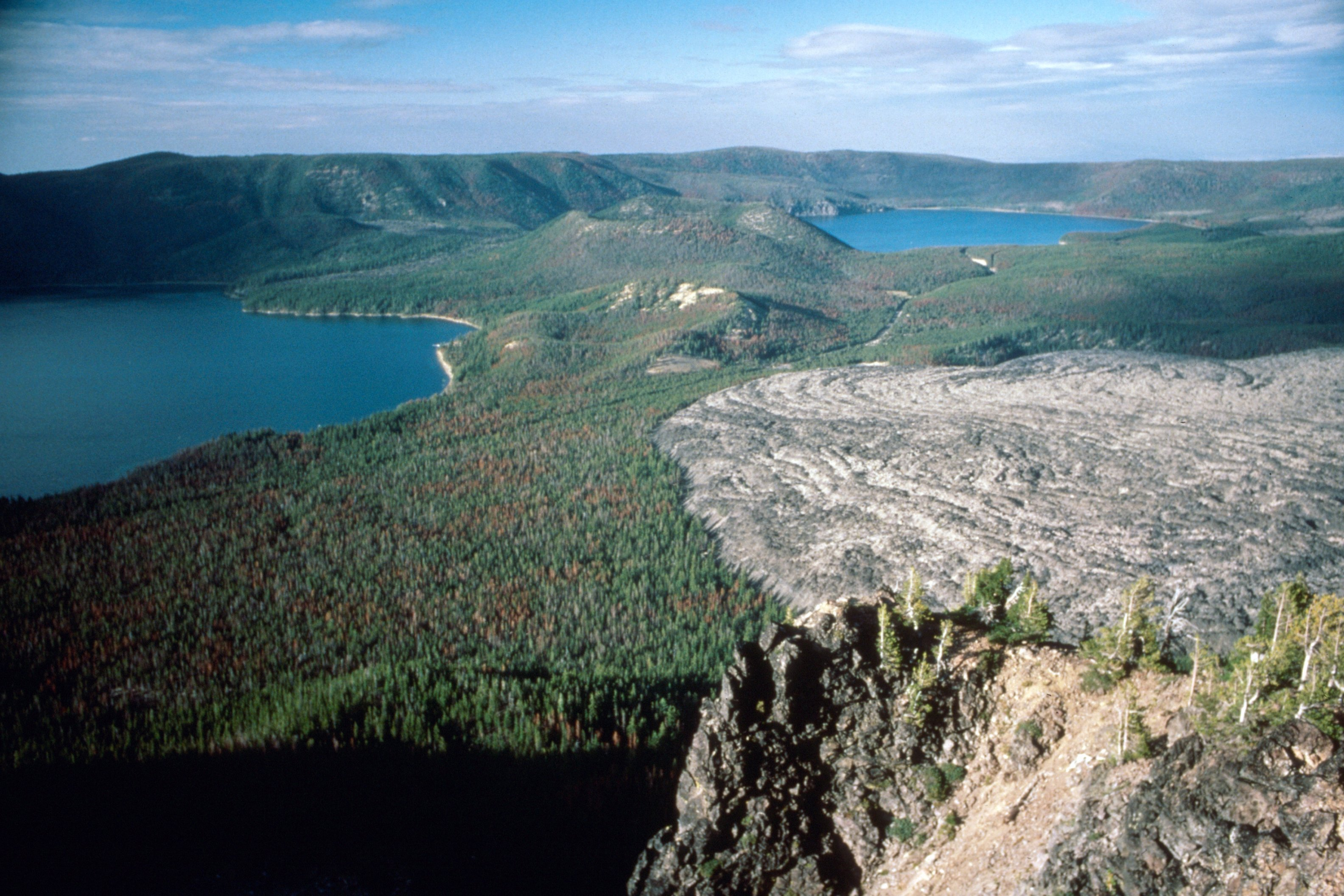
Within the Newberry Volcano caldera, top (from left to right): Paulina Lake, the central cone, and East Lake; bottom (right): the obsidian flow known as Big Obsidian

A 1993 U.S. Forest Service study estimated that the extent of old growth in the forest was 348,100 acres (140,900 hectares), about 21.7% of the park's total area. The endangered whitebark pine can be found in the forest. No other federally endangered or threatened species were known as of 2009. The park also includes at least 460 acres (190 ha) of fen wetland.

Forbs in the forest include Achillea millefolium (yarrow), Antennaria rosea, Carex rossii, Chaenactis douglasii, Ericameria bloomeri, Eriogonum umbellatum, Eriophyllum lanatum, Fragaria virginiana (strawberry), Ipomopsis aggregata, Juncus balticus, Linum lewisii, Lupinus lepidus, Packera cana, Penstemon davidsonii, P. fruticosus, P. humilis, and P. speciosus.

Grasses include Achnatherum hymenoides, Bromus carinatus, Elymus elymoides, Festuca idahoensis, Koeleria macrantha, Leymus cinereus, and Pseudoroegneria spicata.

Shrubs include Arctostaphylos nevadensis, A. patula, Artemisia tridentata, Ceanothus prostratus, C. velutinus, Cercocarpus ledifolius, Chamaebatiaria millefolium, Chrysothamnus viscidiflorus, Cornus sericea, Holodiscus dumosus, Lonicera involucrata, Philadelphus lewisii, Physocarpus malvaceus, Prunus virginiana (chokecherry), Purshia tridentata, Ribes aureum (golden currant), Symphoricarpos albus, Ribes cereum (wax currant), and Rosa woodsii.

The forest also contains matsutake mushrooms. In 2010, in partnership with Oregon State University, the area hosted a first-of-its-kind genetic analysis of soil to locate the fungi. Permits are sold for collecting mushrooms, with commercial picking prohibited in most official areas. Matsutake can be collected for a two-month season beginning on September 5. Other fungi share a permit system with the Fremont–Winema, Umpqua, and Willamette national forests.

Animals found in the forest include elk, deer, and frogs. The forest's caves provides habitat to around 14 species of bats, which consume millions of insects.

== Activities ==
Recreational activities in the forest include boating, fishing, wildlife watching, and hiking, as well as mountain biking (with an extensive trail system). Hiking and skiing can be done on Mount Bachelor, a stratovolcano in the Cascade Range.

== See also ==
- Deschutes River
- Cascade Lakes Scenic Byway
- List of national forests of the United States
