= Paulina Lake Guard Station =

- U.S. National Register of Historic Places
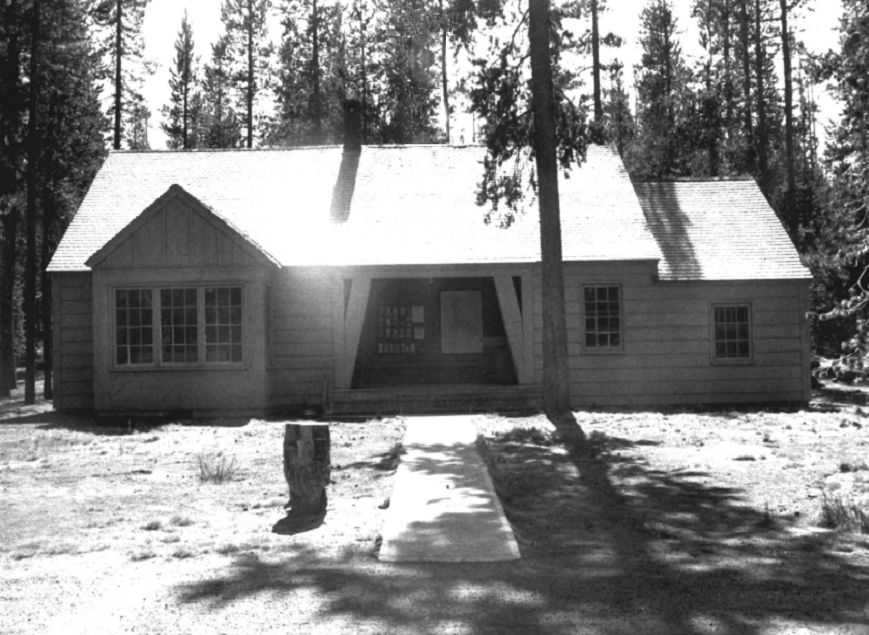
- Guard station front entrance, 1984
- Location: Deschutes National Forest
- Nearest city: Bend, Oregon, USA
- Coordinates: 43.71154°N 121.2768°W
- Built: 1938
- Architectural style: Simple rustic
- NRHP reference No.: 86000825
- Added to NRHP: 1986

The Paulina Lake Guard Station is a Forest Service building located in the Newberry National Volcanic Monument in Central Oregon. The guard station was built by the Civilian Conservation Corps to house the seasonal assistant ranger responsible for patrolling the forest around Paulina Lake. Because of its rustic architecture, the guard station was listed on the National Register of Historic Places in 1986.

== History ==
In the 1920s and 1930s, Forest Service employees often traveled many miles from local ranger stations to forest work sites. Since the forest road networks were not well developed, getting to a job site meant a long trek, carrying all the equipment need to perform the field work. This made it impractical for employees to make daily round-trips. To facilitate work at remote sites, the Forest Service built guard stations at strategic locations throughout the forest to house fire patrols and project crews. After World War II, the Forest Service greatly expanded its road network, allowing employees to get to most National Forest areas within a few hours. As a result, many guard stations were no longer needed. The Forest Service found new uses for some stations, but most were demolished or abandon.

The Paulina Lake Guard Station was built by the Civilian Conservation Corps in 1938. It was originally constructed to house a seasonal assistant ranger working for the Fort Rock Ranger District. Today, it is located within the Newberry National Volcanic Monument area of the Deschutes National Forest. The guard station was named after nearby Paulina Lake, a large lake inside the caldera of Newberry Crater. Paulina Lake is, in turn, name for Chief Paulina, a Paiute leader of the Walpapi band during the Snake War in the 1860s.

The guard station was originally built as a residence for the forest guard responsible for patrolling the campgrounds and forest around the Paulina Lake during the summer wildfire season. From 1942 through the summer of 1959, John P. Robins was the forest guard assigned to the Paulina Lake Guard Station. Robins and his family lived at the guard station for seventeen summers. Robins' two sons later wrote a book about their experience at the guard station.

The Paulina Lake Guard Station exemplifies rustic architectural style developed by the Forest Service in the Pacific Northwest during the early 20th century. Because of its rustic architecture and the cabin's unique historic value as an early Forest Service guard station, it was listed on the National Register of Historic Places on 11 April 1986. In 1990, the United States Congress established the 50,000-acre (200 km^{2}) Newberry National Volcanic Monument. Because of its location, the guard station became part of the National Monument. Today, the guard station building is the home of the Paulina Visitor Center.

== Structure ==
The Civilian Conservation Corps built the guard station residence in 1938. It is rectangular one-story, wood-frame structures with gabled roof. The structure rests of a concrete foundation. There is an interior stone chimney off center from the roof ridge. The exterior walls are horizontal clapboard with vertical board and batten covering the gable ends. Windows are either a nine or twelve pane light sash type. The main front window is a group of three twelve pane windows set below a front gabled bay. A garage with hinged two-leaf doors is built into one end of the structure.

The main entrance is at the centered on the front façade. It has a recessed porch, enclosed on three sides. The porch has a flagstone platform floor. The entryway is framed by heavy timber beams. The outer posts are vertical and flush with the exterior wall while the two inner posts are angled inward. All four posts support a heavy, square lintel beam.

== Location ==
The Paulina Lake Guard Station is located in the Newberry National Volcanic Monument area of the Deschutes National Forest. It is approximately 36 miles (58 km) southeast of Bend, Oregon. The elevation at the site is 6,350 feet (1,940 m) above sea level. The forest around the guard station is dominated by ponderosa pine with a few lodgepole pine in the area as well.

To get to the Paulina Lake Guard Station from Bend, travel south on Highway 97 twenty-three miles then turn right onto Forest Service Road 21. Follow Road 21 for thirteen-mile (21 km) to Paulina Lake campground and the guard station. There is a vehicle fee charged within the Newberry National Volcanic Monument to help cover the cost of operating and maintaining the facilities in the area. There are additional fees for camping inside the monument.
