= Newberry Volcano =

Shield volcano in Oregon, United States

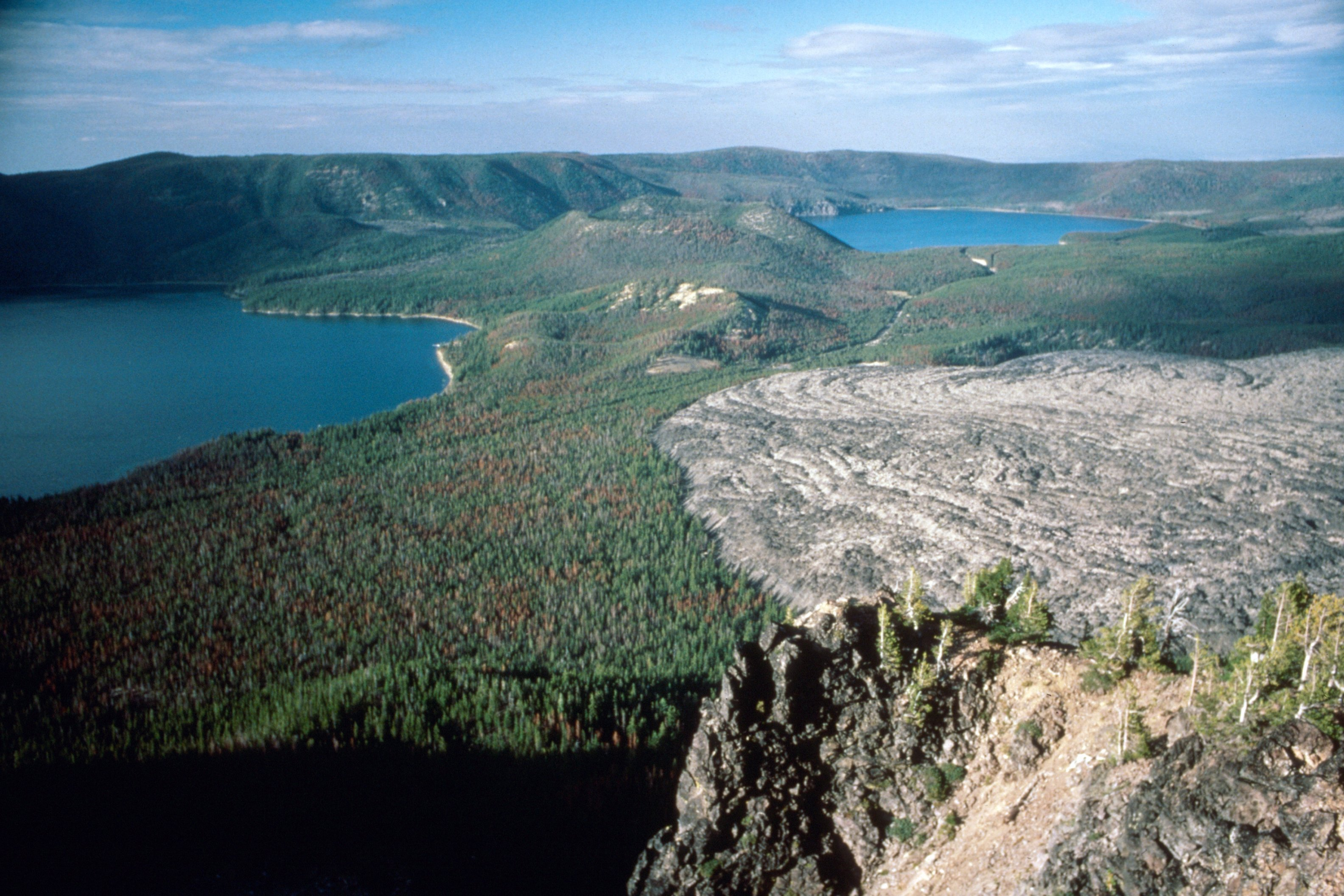
- Newberry Caldera, with Paulina Lake, East Lake, and Big Obsidian Flow.

Highest point
- Elevation: 7,989 ft (2,435 m)
- Coordinates: 43°41′21″N 121°15′18″W

Geography
- Location: Deschutes County, Oregon, U.S.
- Parent range: Cascade Range
- Topo map: USGS Paulina Peak

Geology
- Formed by: Subduction zone volcanism
- Rock age: About 600,000 years old
- Mountain type(s): Characteristics of both shield volcanoes and composite volcanoes
- Volcanic arc: Cascade Volcanic Arc
- Last eruption: 690 AD

Climbing
- Easiest route: Road to Paulina Peak

U.S. National Natural Landmark
- Designated: 1976

Newberry Volcano is a large, active, shield-shaped stratovolcano located about 20 miles (32 km) south of Bend, Oregon, United States, 35 miles (56 km) east of the major crest of the Cascade Range, within the Newberry National Volcanic Monument. Its highest point is Paulina Peak. Newberry is the largest volcano in the Cascade Volcanic Arc, with an area of 1,200 square miles (3,100 km^{2}) when its lava flows are taken into account. From north to south, the volcano has a length of 75 miles (121 km), with a width of 27 miles (43 km) and a total volume of approximately 120 cubic miles (500 km^{3}). It was named for the geologist and surgeon John Strong Newberry, who explored central Oregon for the Pacific Railroad Surveys in 1855.

The volcano contains a large caldera, 4 by 5 miles (6.4 km × 8.0 km) in diameter, known as the Newberry Caldera. Within the caldera are two lakes: Paulina Lake and East Lake. The volcano and its vicinity include many pyroclastic cones, lava flows and lava domes; Newberry has more than 400 vents, the most of any volcano in the contiguous United States. Glaciers may have once been present at the volcano, though this remains contested. The area has a dry climate with low precipitation levels and little surface runoff.

The origin of the volcano remains somewhat unclear; while some scientists believe it originated from an independent hotspot, most evidence indicates that it formed from the subduction of the oceanic Juan de Fuca and Gorda tectonic plates under the continental North American Plate. Eruptive activity at Newberry Volcano began about 600,000 years ago and has continued into the Holocene, the last eruption taking place 1,300 years ago. Unlike other shield-shaped volcanoes, which often erupt basaltic lavas only, Newberry Volcano has also erupted andesitic and rhyolitic lavas. A popular destination for hiking, fishing, boating, and other recreational activities, the volcano lies within 19 miles (31 km) of 16,400 people and within 62 miles (100 km) of nearly 200,000 people, and it continues to pose a threat to life. Still considered an active volcano, it could erupt and produce lava flows, pyroclastic flows, lahars (volcanically induced mudslides, landslides, and debris flows), ashfall, earthquakes, avalanches, and floods. To track this threat, the volcano and its surroundings are closely monitored with sensors by the United States Geological Survey.

== Geography ==
The center of Newberry Volcano lies 20 miles (32 km) to the south of the city of Bend, at the intersection of Deschutes, Klamath and Lake counties in Oregon, where it is one of the most accessible volcanoes in the state. It is the largest volcano in the Cascade Volcanic Arc at 620 square miles (1,600 km^{2}), and has roughly the same area as the state of Rhode Island at 1,200 square miles (3,100 km^{2}) if its lava flows are included. Newberry lies 37 miles (60 km) east of the major crest of the Cascade Range in the High Lava Plains region, rising 3,500 feet (1,100 m) above its surroundings. From north to south, the volcano runs for a length of 75 miles (121 km), with a width of 27 miles (43 km) and a total volume of about 140 cubic miles (600 km^{3}). Because of its enormous size and topographic prominence, it is often confused for an entire mountain range.

Newberry Volcano has a somewhat dry climate due to its location in the rain shadow of the Cascade Range. Climate data for the Newberry National Volcanic Monument are collected at the Lava Butte cinder cone, which had an average annual precipitation of 17.9 inches (455 mm) from 2002 to 2012. Summer temperatures average from 73 to 82 °F (23 to 28 °C), dipping to average minimum and maximum temperatures of −1.8 to 68.9 °F (−18.8 to 20.5 °C) during the winter season. Spring has average temperatures of 60 °F (16 °C), while fall temperatures average 67 °F (19 °C). Each year, total precipitation consisting of winter snow and summer rain varies from 9.8 to 29.5 inches (25 to 75 cm) in the highest parts of the region, and surface runoff rarely occurs even during heavy rain showers. Only one stream appears on Newberry's entire surface, and it remains unclear whether the volcano has ever been able to support glaciers on its slopes, since the mountain lacks cirques (amphitheater-like valleys formed by glacial erosion) or evidence of contact between lava and ice. However, displaced glacial erratics have been found far from their native areas, moraine sediment has been deposited on the eastern and northeastern slopes of the volcano, and the mountain's various cone features have "boat" shapes that indicate glacial alteration. The precise history of glaciers on the volcano is debated, but dry channels and dry waterfalls on the eastern and western slopes are evidence that the volcano once held water.

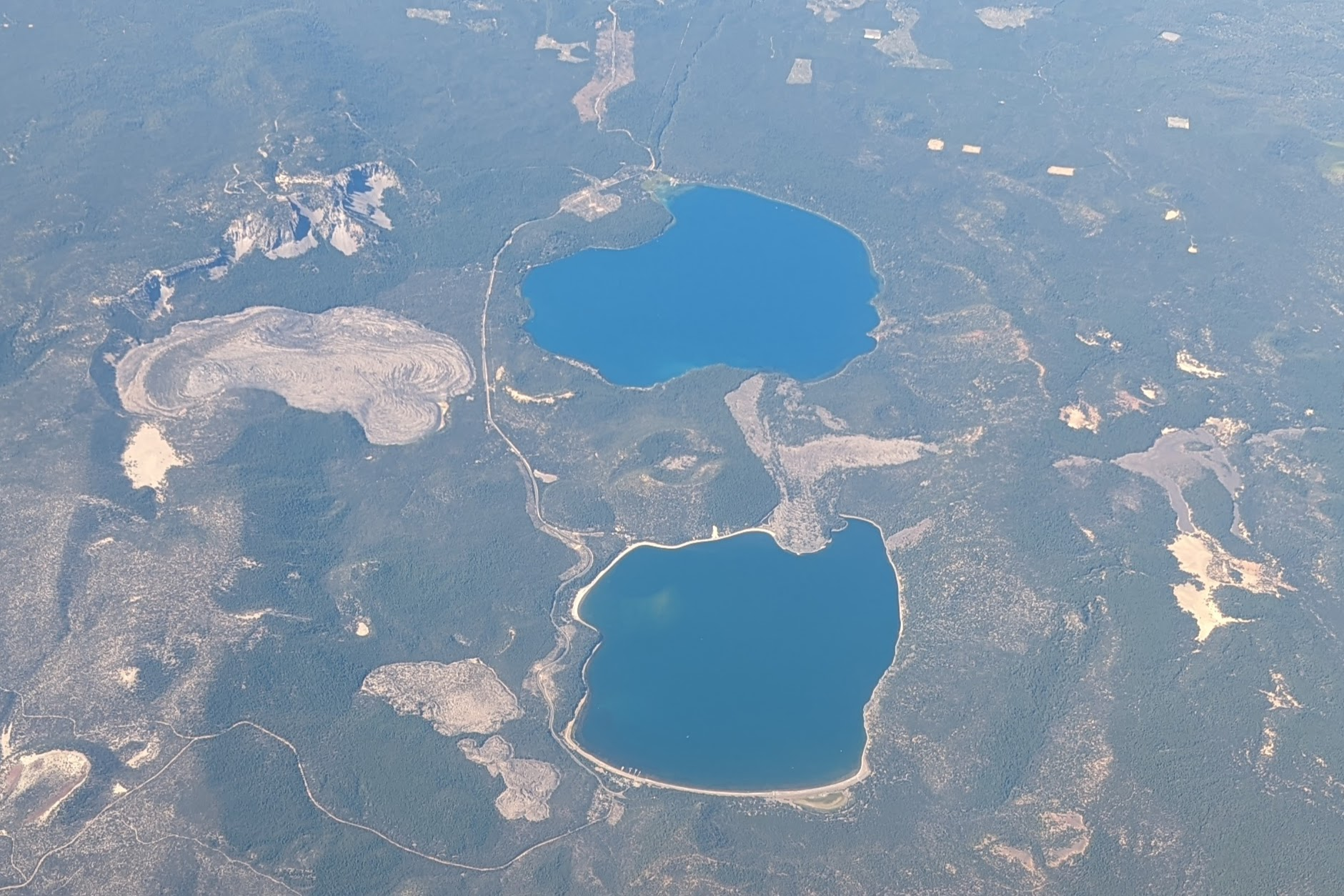
Aerial view of Paulina Lake and East Lake seen from the east

The volcano has two crater lakes, Paulina Lake and East Lake, which are filled by precipitation and percolation of ground water. Paulina Lake occupies an area of 1,530 acres (6.2 km^{2}) and reaches a maximum depth of 250 feet (76 m), and it is separated from East Lake by a narrow isthmus, which is composed of rhyolite lava. East Lake has a smaller area of 1,050 acres (4.2 km^{2}) with a maximum depth of 180 feet (55 m). The lakes have historically flooded channels surrounding the volcano. A large flood between 4,000 and 2,300 years ago released up to 12,000 acre feet (0.0148 km^{3}) in volume from Paulina Lake, filling the valley floor above the Paulina Prairie, downstream of the lake. It was possibly caused by the failure of a rock ledge 5 feet (1.5 m) in height, rather than eruptive activity. Another flood took place in 1909 on the Deschutes River downstream from where it meets its tributary the Little Deschutes River.

== Ecology ==
The Newberry National Volcanic Monument forms part of the northern section of the Mazama Ecological Province, which has soil comprised by aeolian pumice and volcanic products over basalt bedrock. Flora within the Newberry Volcano area includes forests of juniper, whitebark pine, ponderosa pine (including Oregon's largest ponderosa pine tree), lodgepole pine, jack pine, and white fir, in addition to other plants like Indian paintbrush, purple penstemon, bitterbrush, manzanita, and snowbrush. Infestations by mountain pine beetles have killed many lodgepole pines in the area. Animals near Newberry Volcano include burrowing owls, kangaroo rats, lizards, bats, rattlesnakes, eagles, porcupines, otters, bobcats, mule deer, Roosevelt elk, ducks, and American pika.

Lava flows from Newberry display varied vegetation cover, and there are variable levels of flora between flows, though the level of vegetation and species diversity generally increase with elevation. Dominant plant species on lava flows include oceanspray and wax currant, with rabbitbrush also common. Though forbs are not widespread on the lava flows, where they do occur Davidson's penstemon and hotrock penstemon dominate. Above elevations of 4,890 feet (1,490 m), roundleaf alumroot is common, particularly near the edges of lava flows. All lava flows support patches of grasses such as Idaho fescue, especially on north-facing slopes. One lava flow at Lava Butte is barren except for scattered, dense patches of greenleaf manzanita.

The Lava Cast Forest is a group of trees molded by lava from an eruption 6,000 years ago. Today, the surrounding site lies within the Newberry National Volcanic Monument and includes 11 kīpukas, plots of land surrounded by one or more younger lava flows. These habitat islands range from 0.74 to 279.23 acres (0.3 to 113 ha) in area and sustain forests that have not been significantly altered by humans other than nearby fire suppression and land management efforts. Consisting of pure and mixed forest stands, these forests include ponderosa pine, lodgepole pine, and grand fir/white fir hybrid trees, which are supported by young soils derived from Mazama pumice.

== Geology ==
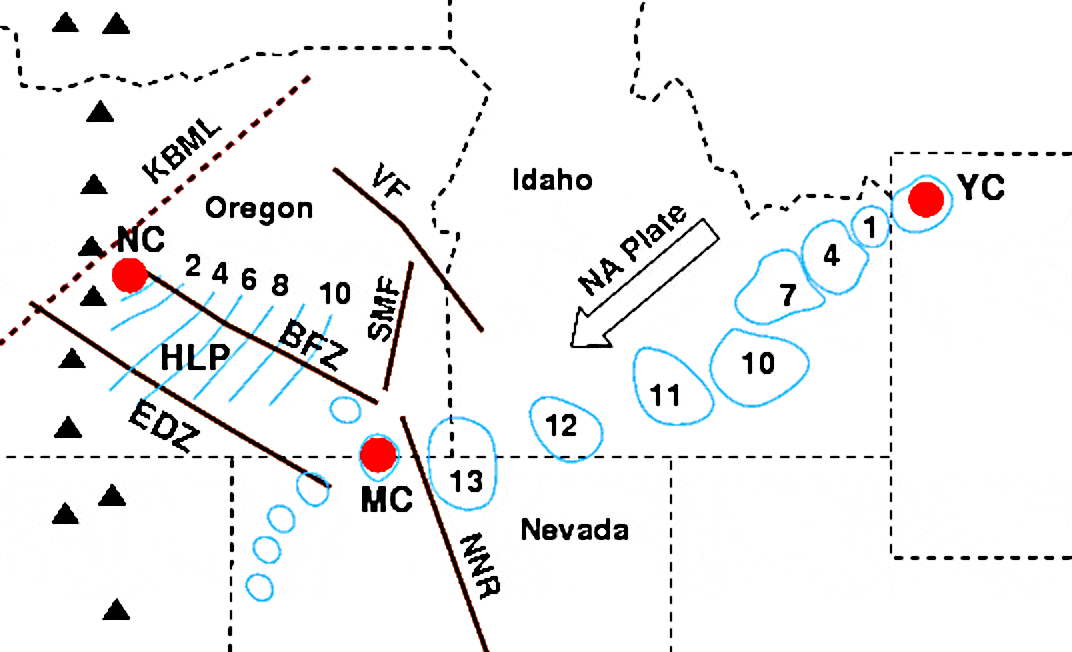
Progression of ages of rhyolitic (silicic) lavas and calderas from McDermitt Caldera to Newberry and Yellowstone calderas (red circles: MC, NC, & YC). Numbers are ages in millions of years. KBML = Klamath–Blue Mountains Lineament HLP = High Lava Plains EDZ = Eugene–Denio Zone BFZ = Brothers Fault Zone SMF = Steens Mountain Fault VF = Vale Fault NNR = North Nevada Rift White arrow shows direction of North American plate. Edge of the craton is approximately along the Oregon–Idaho border. Triangles are Cascades volcanoes.

Overlapping with the northwestern corner of the Basin and Range Province, also known as the High Lava Plains, Newberry Volcano lies within a Cenozoic highland marked by normal faults known as the Brothers Fault Zone. It is situated at the intersection of the Brothers Fault Zone with the north–northwest-trending Sisters and northeast-trending Walker Rim fault zones. In the mantle under Newberry Volcano, P and S seismic waves exhibit an unusually low wave velocity. The Earth's crust thins from 31 miles (50 km) at the nearby Three Sisters volcano complex to 22 miles (35 km) near Newberry, where it has a high Poisson's ratio.

The oldest rocks in this region include silicic (rich in silica) lava domes from the late Miocene or early Pliocene, which lie near the province's eastern and southern borders, respectively. Volcanism in this area suggests a progression of silicic eruptions, known as the Newberry Trend, that moves in a northwest-trending direction from the Harney Basin to Newberry Volcano and the rest of the Cascade Range. Newberry Volcano's origins are somewhat controversial; some scientists think it originated from an independent hotspot, but overwhelming evidence suggests that it is part of the Cascade Arc and was produced by the subduction of the oceanic Juan de Fuca and Gorda tectonic plates under the continental North American Plate. However, Newberry Volcano has been transformed by tectonic processes, possibly related to subductive mechanisms that enhance melting of the Juan de Fuca tectonic plate. The High Lava Plains Trend, or the Newberry Trend, moves at an oblique angle to the underlying North American tectonic plate, for which subduction counterflow, gravitational flow along the lithosphere's base, faulting, and extension of the Basin and Range Province have all been proposed as possible mechanisms. At Newberry, the subducting plate has a depth that is 12 to 31 miles (20 to 50 km) shallower than elsewhere in the major crest of the Cascades,^{[b]} accounting for its unique magmas. Newberry Volcano is likely fed by a magma chamber 1.9 to 3.1 miles (3 to 5 km) under the large, cauldron-like caldera at its summit. This caldera has dimensions of 4.0 by 5.0 miles (6.5 by 8 km) and formed about 75,000 years ago.

Newberry Volcano first formed about 600,000 years ago and has since been built up by several thousand eruptions. About 500,000 years ago, Mount Newberry attained an elevation of 14,000 feet (4,300 m). The caldera-forming event occurred about 75,000 years ago from a major explosive eruption. It formed the crater lakes and Paulina Peak—which is the highest point on the volcano, at 7,989 feet (2,435 m).^{[a]}

As a result of its caldera-forming eruption, Newberry has a horizontal profile, which is typical of a shield volcano. However, it is also considered a composite volcano, made up of a matrix of lava flows and pyroclastic deposits. Unlike more typical composite volcanoes in the Cascades, it formed from several eruption types including more traditional explosive eruptions and more fluid effusive events; thus it is usually classified as a "shield-shaped composite volcano", or shield-shaped stratovolcano. The volcano has a caldera at its summit, which has a diameter of 4 by 5 miles (6.4 by 8.0 km) and features two crater lakes: Paulina Lake and East Lake. This caldera, known as the Newberry Crater, is forested, with small parts of its surface covered with lava flows and pumice deposits. Before the caldera's creation, the mountain's summit was 500 to 1,000 feet (150 to 300 m) greater in height than its current elevation. The caldera has reformed several times throughout the volcano's history, burying the caldera floor to a depth of 1,640 feet (500 m) and creating concentric calderas, each smaller than its predecessor. The first caldera—the volcano's largest caldera, forming approximately 300,000 years ago—was produced by the eruption of 2.5 cubic miles (10 km^{3}) of pyroclastic ejecta, which created the Tepee Draw tuff and ash deposits that cover the volcano's eastern flank. The last crater formed after an explosive eruption about 80,000 years ago, which ejected up to 2.5 cubic miles (10 km^{3}) of pyroclastic materials. Throughout this progression, the volcano shifted from rhyodacitic pumice to basaltic ash flows, the latter producing the Black Lapilli tuff that covers the western side of the volcano. Since the last caldera-forming eruption 80,000 years ago, the volcano has undergone silicic eruptions at the caldera and produced basaltic and basaltic andesite lava flows that extended down its outer flanks. The tephra and ash from the Black Lapilli tuff by the caldera formed agglutinates around its rim. Newberry Volcano is cut by several fault scarps, small step offsets on the ground surface where one side of a fault has moved vertically with respect to the other.

At the center of the isthmus that separates Newberry Volcano's two crater lakes is the central volcanic cone, named Central Pumice cone, which reaches 700 feet (210 m) above East Lake. With a broad, flat top, it formed during an explosive eruption about 7,000 years ago, and sits in the center of the caldera.

Compositionally, lava from the Newberry Volcano has varied from primitive basalts with high magnesium levels to more evolved tholeiitic and calc-alkaline deposits (based on the major element characteristics of the lavas). Primitive lavas exhibit high abundances of chromium and nickel as well as variable concentrations of fluid-mobile elements like barium and strontium. Tholeiitic and calc-alkaline lavas display overlap in magnesium, calcium oxide, and aluminum oxide levels but differ in that the tholeiites have lower contents of silica and potassium oxide and higher iron(II) oxide, titanium dioxide, and sodium oxide. There is also much overlap in isotopic composition, though the tholeiitic lavas mark the low point for ^{87}Sr/^{86}Sr and the high point for ^{143}Nd/^{144}Nd and ^{176}Hf/^{177}Hf. Examination of Newberry lavas with olivine-plagioclase hygrometry shows that tholeiites are anhydrous (less than 0.5 percentage by weight water) and thus distinct from calc-alkaline deposits (2–4 percentage by weight water); both have different fractional crystallization sequences that derive from primitive magmas, which had their compositions influenced by equilibrium with peridotite in the mantle. By volume, basaltic andesite is the principal lava type at Newberry Volcano, with large volumes of silicic lava among older ash flow tuff deposits.

=== Subfeatures ===
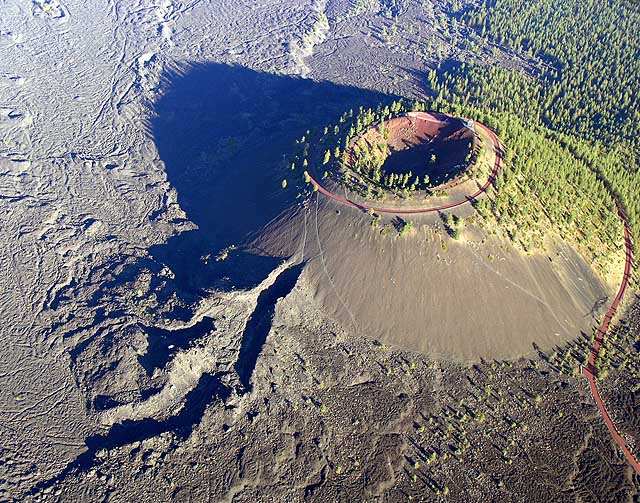
Lava Butte, a cinder cone produced by eruptions at Newberry Volcano

Vents at the volcano follow north-east and north-west trends influenced by extension of the Basin and Range Province. With more than 400 vents, Newberry has more individual subfeatures than any other volcano in the contiguous United States. These include cinder cones, lava domes, and various other lava edifices, with at least 25 vents on the volcano's flanks and summits becoming active within the past 10,000 years. Most of the cinder cones on the volcano's edifice vary from 200 to 400 feet (61 to 122 m) in elevation, though a number of them reach heights above 500 feet (150 m) with diameters greater than 1/2 mile (0.80 km). Most of these exhibit saucer-like summit depression landforms, with notable exceptions at Lava Top and North Kawak Buttes, which have craters that are 200 to 300 feet (61 to 91 m) in depth. Basaltic and basaltic andesite lava flows have penetrated the bases of many of these cinder cones, forming a matrix of connected flows, and a veneer of pāhoehoe and ʻaʻā lavas can be found on Newberry volcano's northern and southern sides. The northern flank holds three distinct lava tube systems that formed out of pāhoehoe lava: the Horse Lava Tube System (also known as the Horse System), Arnold Lava Tube System, and the Lava Top Butte basalt.

About 7,000 years ago, at Newberry's Northwest Rift Zone, lava fountains erupted from a fissure with a length of 1.5 miles (2.4 km), yielding basaltic and andesitic lava flows. Strombolian eruptions (which eject incandescent cinder, lapilli, and lava bombs) produced tephra that formed Lava Butte, a cinder cone near Newberry with a height of 500 feet (150 m), a base diameter of 2,300 feet (700 m), and a crater depth of 160 feet (50 m). With a lopsided shape where the northeastern rim is 82 feet (25 m) taller than the southwestern counterpart, this cinder cone sits 10 miles (16 km) south of Bend.

The nearby Badlands shield volcano, which formed out of a rootless vent to produce a large basaltic lava flow at Newberry, has a diameter of 8 miles (13 km). It has pāhoehoe lava throughout its surface, with tumuli (mounds of earth and stones) and a pit crater.

Dacite and rhyodacite domes can be found on the middle and upper flanks, and Newberry also features twenty rhyolitic lava domes and lava flows among its western, eastern, and southern flanks. These include East Butte and China Hat at the eastern base of the volcano, which date to 850,000 and 780,000 years ago, and therefore predate Newberry. The McKay Butte, found on the volcano's western side, formed 580,000 years ago. Other Holocene eruptions have produced rhyolite lava that remained close to the summit, including Paulina Peak, which has a width of one mile and reaches within 3 miles (4.8 km) of the wall of the caldera.

Hot springs can be found at Paulina Lake and East Lake, along with one fumarole gas vent at Lost Lake, located near the Big Obsidian lava flow. These discharge gases like water vapor and carbon dioxide and give off a rotten smell, though the composition has few noxious components.

== Eruptive history ==
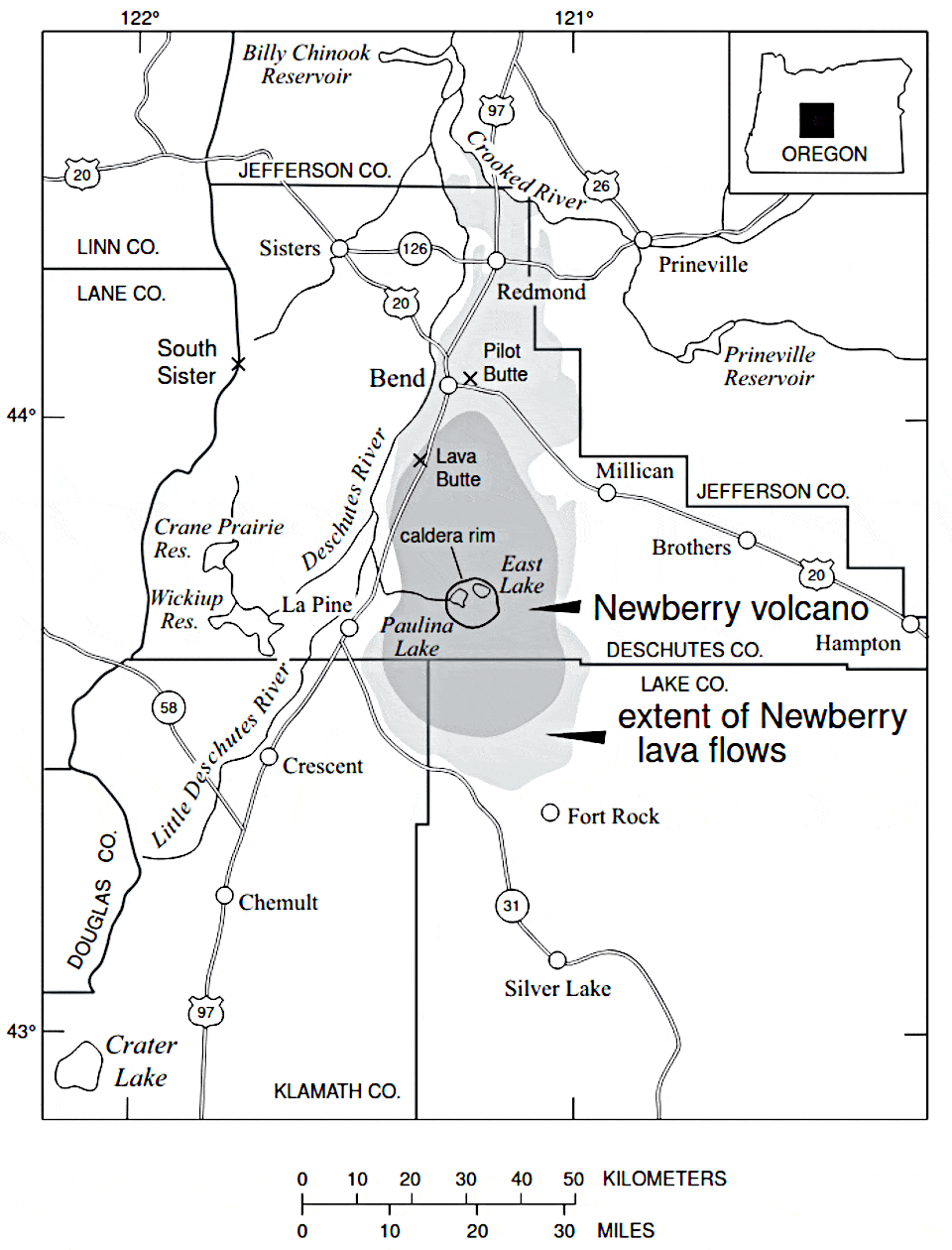
Map showing lava flows from the Newberry Volcano

During the late Pleistocene, Newberry Volcano produced a number of voluminous lava flows, made of basalt, which originated from several vents on its northern flank and reached the modern areas of Bend and Redmond. They filled canyons that served as precursors for the Deschutes and Crooked rivers–since eroded–and extended tens of miles from the volcano. Lava from the last of these eruptions about 78,000 years ago covered the Bend area, surrounded the Pilot Butte cinder cone, and filled the Deschutes River bed.

In addition to its production of large lava flows, Newberry Volcano has also produced a number of Plinian eruptions similar to the eruption of Vesuvius that destroyed Pompeii and Peléan eruptions like the 1902 explosion of Mount Pelée. These include a number of caldera-forming eruptions, producing ash flow deposits including the Tepee Draw tuff and Black Lapilli tuff, and rising 20 miles (32 km) or more into the stratosphere. The last of these eruptions covered tens of thousands of square miles with ash, extending to the San Francisco Bay Area in California nearly 500 miles (800 km) to the southwest. Here, it reaches a thickness of one centimeter. Additionally, Newberry has produced multiple, voluminous explosive eruptions, with certain studies estimating up to 60 eruptive events of rhyolite and dacite tephra that reach Idaho, Utah, and northern California. These include the eruption that produced the Paulina Creek tephra between 55,000 and 50,000 years ago, and the eruption from 20,000 years ago responsible for the Wono tephra, which extends into western Nevada and east-central California. As a result of compositional zoning within the magma chamber that feeds the volcano, its ash deposits may show different chemical and mineralogical makeups. The last of these tephra eruptions yielded the Newberry pumice just before 1,300 years ago, reaching several hundred miles to the east.

Between the last Ice Age about 12,000 years ago and 7,700 years ago, the volcano erupted at least 12 times. Mount Mazama erupted 7,700 years ago, producing volcanic ash and pumice that accumulated to a thickness of up to 6 feet (1.8 m) on the Newberry Volcano, covering many of the lava flows on its slopes. During three eruptive periods at Newberry over the past 7,500 years, the caldera has seen rhyolitic eruptions from seven individual vents. About 7,000 years ago, eruptions occurred along the rift zone northwest of Newberry Volcano's caldera, yielding 12 lava flows that encompassed an area of 23 square miles (60 km^{2}). At about the same time, the Central Pumice cone was produced by eruptions that also formed the Interlake and Game Hut obsidian flows from a vent on the cone's southern flank. An eruption from a fissure zone at East Lake, 3,500 years ago, yielded tephra and formed the East Lake obsidian lava flows.

The volcano underwent its most recent eruptions 1,300 years ago, producing the Big Obsidian flow. A silicic deposit, it is made up of rhyolite and features a number of lava blocks. Although it is frequently cited as the largest Holocene obsidian formation in the United States, its area of 1.09 square miles (2.8 km^{2}) and volume of 0.031 cubic miles (0.13 km^{3}) actually place it fifth in the nation. The eruptions, which were both explosive and effusive, began with a Plinian explosion of pumice and tephra that covered the caldera's eastern half and reached several hundred miles to the east. This deposit, called the Newberry pumice, reaches a thickness of 12 feet (3.7 m) up to 5.5 miles (8.9 km) from the vent that produced it, which is located at the southern flank of the caldera, and a thickness of 10 inches (25 cm) up to 40 miles (64 km) from the volcano. Because of strong westerly winds, tephra reached as far east as Idaho. This eruption also produced pyroclastic flows that left volcanic bombs in Paulina Lake.

=== Recent activity and current threats ===
Though Newberry Volcano is currently quiet, the United States Geological Survey considers it an active volcano with a "very high" threat level. Hot springs within the caldera remain active, and small earthquakes have occurred within recent local history. Any future eruptions would likely show similar characteristics to eruptions from the past 15,000 years, ranging from effusive production of lava flows to explosive eruptions ejecting pumice and ash. If future lava flows from Newberry Volcano are of comparable size to its late Pleistocene eruptions, they would bury settlements throughout the Central Oregon region. They would also likely destroy segments of U.S. Route 97, disabling transportation in the area, in addition to likely ruining gas pipelines and power lines that extend electricity to California, both of which would be accompanied by serious economic consequences.

Flank lava flows, which would likely be basaltic in origin, might form lava fountains that could scatter cinders and lava for several thousand meters, building cinder cones or initiating forest fires. While the flows themselves move at rates of 30 feet (9.1 m) per minute, and thus could be escaped by animals and humans, they would destroy stationary structures in their paths. Pyroclastic flows, on the other hand, travel at speeds of 20 to 200 miles per hour (32 to 322 km/h), and their violent force could incinerate or pulverize objects in their path, or asphyxiate living things.

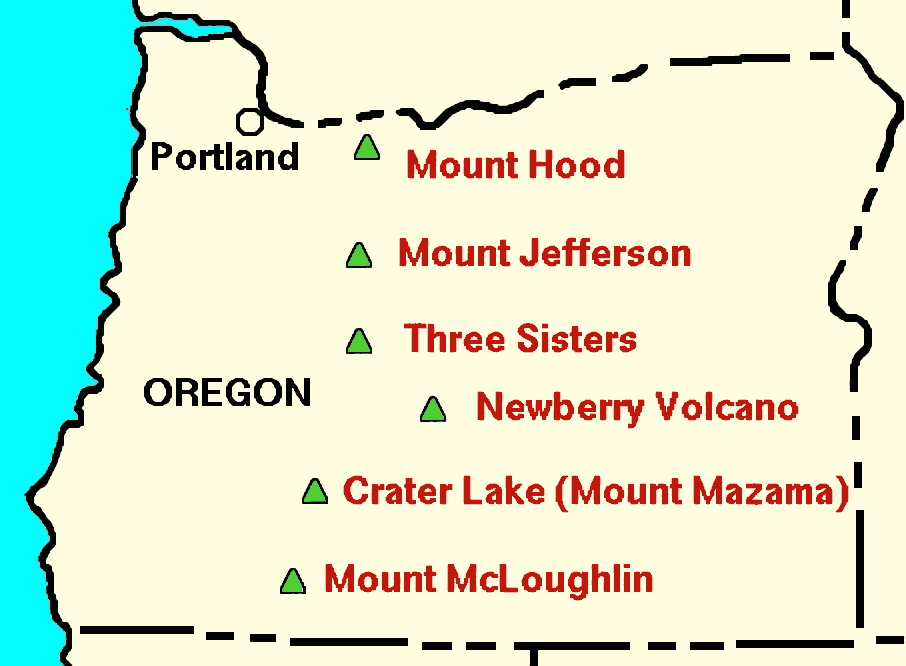
Newberry Volcano's location in Oregon relative to other major volcanoes

If another caldera-forming eruption of similar magnitude to previous ones at the volcano occurred, pyroclastic flows could devastate the area surrounding the volcano for up to 30 miles (48 km). However, pyroclastic flows have been rare at Newberry. Tephra from explosive eruptions would short-circuit electric transformers and power lines, clog engine filters, produce clouds that might yield lightning, and pose a hazard to aircraft overhead. It would also pose health hazards because ash particles can irritate eyes, and when ingested, lungs, among other health issues. Because of water from the two crater lakes, eruptions at Newberry Volcano may become more explosive and more likely to produce pyroclastic flows. Moreover, if pyroclastic flows mix with snow or water overflowing from the crater lakes, they could spawn lahars, volcanically induced mudslides, landslides, and debris flows that could devastate the Paulina Creek valley and reach the La Pine valley within 30 minutes. Threats from the volcano pose hazards to about 16,400 people who live within 19 miles (30 km) and more than 180,000 people living within 62 miles (100 km).

In addition to threats from volcanic activity, at least one flood has taken place at Newberry Volcano in the past, though it may not have been a result of eruptive activity. If lava flows from an eruption blocked the Deschutes River, they might generate floods upstream by increasing water level and downstream once the blockage clears. Earthquakes unrelated to volcanic activity also take place in Oregon, though they are usually less than 2.5 on the Richter magnitude scale. Volcanoes can also cause earthquakes reaching magnitudes up to 5 on the Richter scale, which sometimes occur as swarms. These clusters of tremors cause shaking of houses, walls, and windows and can crack plaster or walls in older buildings but rarely cause major damage. Powerful earthquakes close to magnitude 7 would cause damage independently, but they would not cause Newberry Volcano to erupt unless it were already on the verge of activity. Additional threats exist for rockfalls and avalanches.

If Newberry Volcano were to erupt, it should be possible to detect increased seismic activity, while increased production of volcanic gas would likely kill trees near the volcano, which scientists would quickly recognize before notifying emergency management agencies. Before 2011, Newberry was monitored by just one seismic station that had been installed in 1987 and had only detected seven earthquakes within 12 miles (19 km) of the volcano. In 2011, scientists from the Cascades Volcano Observatory installed eight more seismic and deformation monitors in the volcano's vicinity, which has seen the number of detectable earthquakes rise to 10–15 per year. The volcano continues to be closely monitored by the United States Geological Survey, which monitors a seismometer network with the geophysics program at the University of Washington and regularly conducts leveling surveys to check for deformation that could suggest impending activity, in addition to sampling geothermal areas. There are GPS instruments installed within the volcano's vicinity to monitor any swelling that occurs as a result of underground movement of magma. Despite historical uplift at the volcano, deformation has remained continuously low in recent years.

== Human history ==
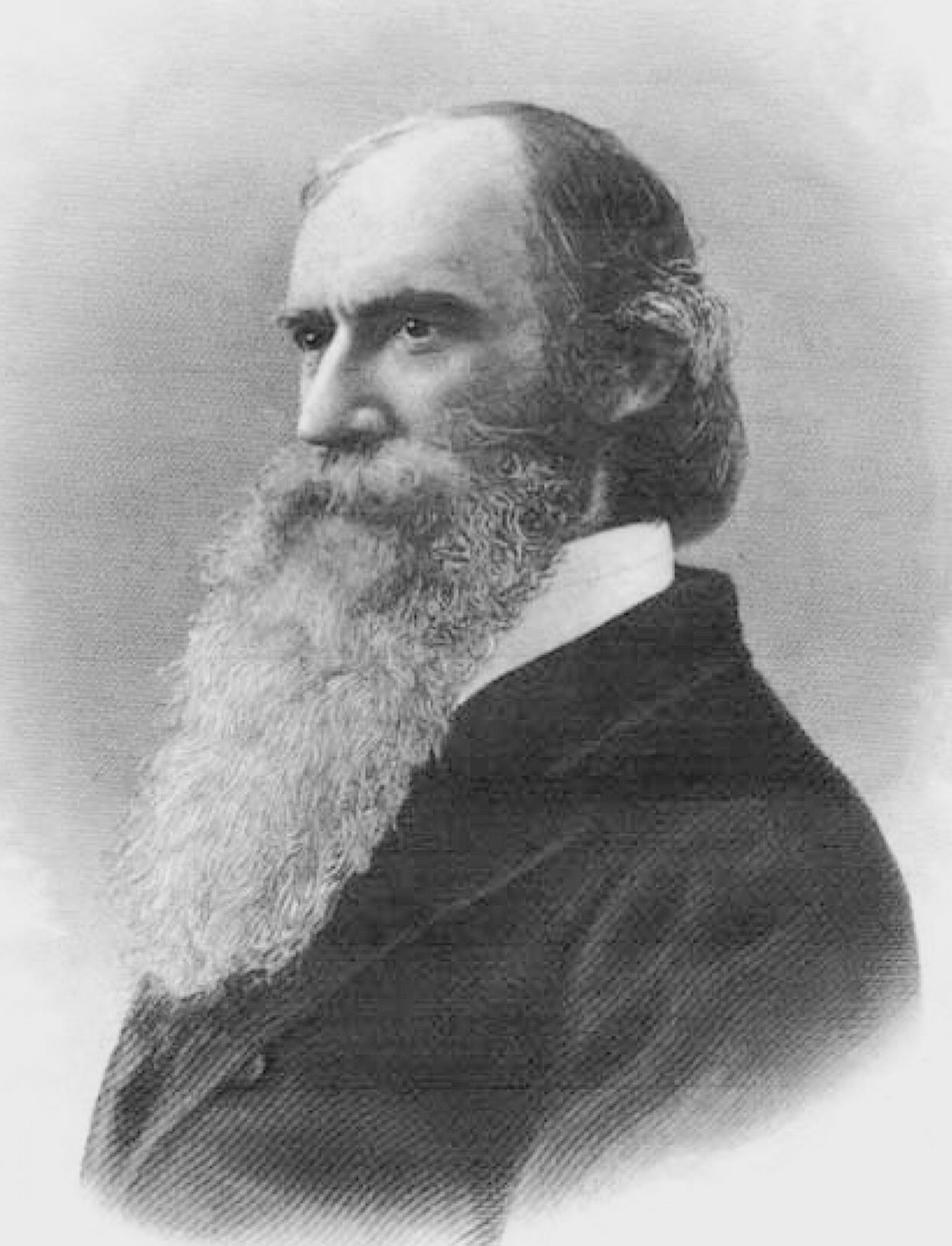
Newberry Volcano was named after John Strong Newberry (pictured), an American surgeon and geologist who explored central Oregon in the early 19th century, though he never actually visited the volcano itself

The area around Newberry Volcano has been inhabited by Native American peoples for more than 10,000 years, though only intermittently as a result of eruptive activity at the volcano and in the surrounding area. During an archaeological excavation near Paulina Lake in 1992, researchers discovered remnants of a central hearth and a housing structure with support posts and linear rock arrangements with dimensions of 13 by 16 feet (4.0 by 4.9 m). Radiocarbon dating of charcoal samples from the site were dated to 11,000 years ago. The mountain's caldera was used to harvest obsidian, which they used to sharpen arrowheads and tools and traded throughout the Pacific Coast region for several thousand years.

The first recorded European to visit the volcano was Peter Skene Ogden, a trapper who reached the crater in 1826. In 1855, the volcano's namesake, John Strong Newberry, a surgeon and geologist for the Williamson and Abbot survey party, visited central Oregon while mapping the local area for the Pacific Railroad, but never visited the volcano. Paulina Lake, Paulina Creek, and Paulina Peak are named after Paulina, a Snake Indian chief who headed raiding parties against whites during the 1850s and 1860s before he was pursued and shot by settler Howard Maupin. Near the end of the 19th century, the Lava River Cave was used by the hunter Leander Dillman to store perishable foods. The name Mount Newberry was proposed by Israel Russell, who visited the area in 1903, though the name did not come into use. Instead, it was known as Newberry Crater until it was renamed to the Newberry Volcano in the 1930s by geologist Howel Williams, a name which was formally accepted in 2003 when geologist Larry Chitwood supported it through the official geographic naming process.

Because of the efforts of Hollis Dole, head of the Oregon Department of Geology, to promote the area, in 1963 NASA scientists became interested in using lava fields at Newberry to prepare for the United States' first Moon landing. NASA used the area in October 1964 and July 1966 to geologically train the Apollo Astronauts in recognizing volcanic features, such as cinder and pumice cones, lava flows, ash and obsidian flows, and a lava tube. Astronauts who would use this training on the Moon included Apollo 11's Neil Armstrong and Buzz Aldrin, Apollo 12's Alan Bean, Apollo 14's Edgar Mitchell, Apollo 15's James Irwin, and Apollo 16's Charlie Duke. Notable geologist instructors included Aaron Waters.

The Newberry National Volcanic Monument was established in November 1990 by the United States Congress. With an area of more than 54,000 acres (220 km^{2}), it forms a near-circular shape around the summit caldera and then a long corridor from the mountain's northwestern side to the Deschutes River that includes a rift zone. The Monument lies within the Deschutes National Forest, which is managed by the United States Forest Service. As of 1997, the caldera area of Newberry holds seven campgrounds, two resort areas, and six summer houses.

=== Mining and geothermal energy ===
Because Newberry has had recent eruptive activity, has remained active for a long time, and has a shallow heat source feeding hot springs, it represents a source of geothermal energy. An investigation conducted by the United States Geological Survey in 1981 drilled a well 3,057 feet (932 m) in depth at a location to the east of the Big Obsidian flow, finding temperatures of 509 °F (265 °C) under the surface there. An energy company drilled two holes with a depth of 10,000 feet (3,000 m) in 1995 and 1996, but they were unable to find fluids, so they lacked a mechanism to drive turbines and opted to end the project at Newberry. According to many scientists, Newberry Volcano represents the best geothermal energy candidate in the Pacific Northwest; in 2012, a deep well was built to determine whether water directed into the hole might be heated and returned to the surface in order to yield energy.

== Recreation ==
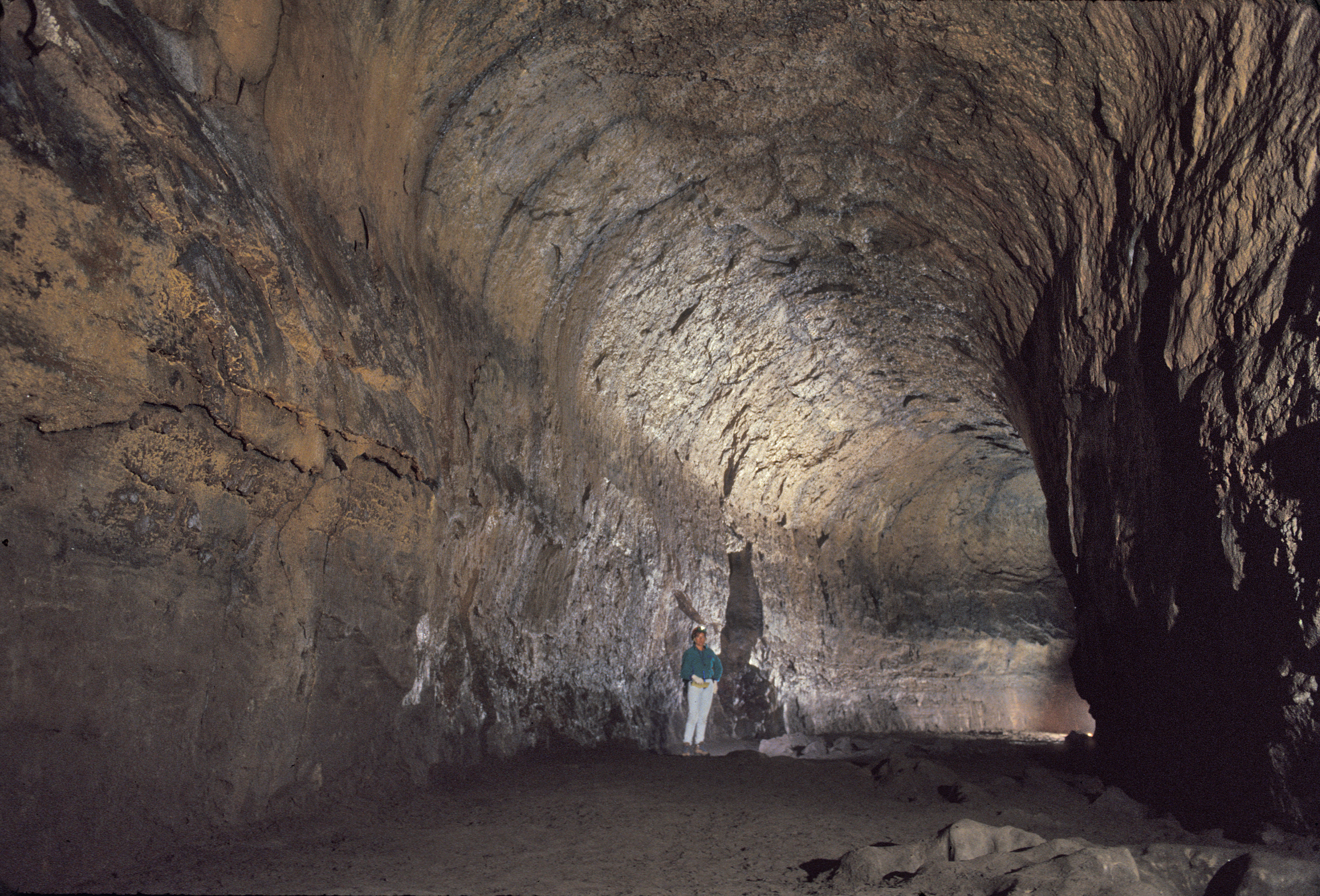
A hiker under the arched ceilings of a representative portion of Lava River Cave

Newberry Volcano is visited by 250,000 people each year, who come to go fishing for trout in East Lake, to camp on Paulina Lake, or go mountain biking around the 22 miles (35 km) loop that surrounds the crater. The lakes are also popular for boating. At the Newberry National Volcanic Monument, camping, fishing, and hiking are popular, including on the Trail of the Molten Land, which follows a 7,000-year-old lava flow from Lava Butte, and the Trail of the Whispering Pines, which traverses a ponderosa pine forest. Horse riding is also possible in a section of the Peter Skene Ogden Trail, 3 miles (4.8 km) long, which runs through the monument area; snowmobiling and cross-country skiing are also popular.

The Lava Lands Visitor Center within the Monument has an exhibit on the area's geology and culture and offers a paved path that runs for 5.5 miles (8.9 km). A shuttle leaves from the center every 20 minutes during the peak season from Memorial Day through Labor Day, costing $2 per traveler. The area can also be accessed by personal motorized vehicles during off season with a permit from the visitor center, and the center's parking area remains open year-round. The area offers eight campgrounds operated by the United States Forest Service.

The last lava flow from Newberry during the Pleistocene formed the Lava River Cave, 12 miles (19 km) to the south of Bend. This feature is the state's longest continuous lava tube, which can be hiked for more than one mile to the north and west and has an arching ceiling with a thickness of 45 feet (14 m). This trail represents the monument's most popular attraction and can be hiked between May and mid-September with a recreation day pass that costs $5. Jackets are recommended, as the temperature within the cave is usually 40 °F (4 °C). The Lava Cast Forest, a group of trees molded by lava from an eruption 6,000 years ago, covers an area of 5 square miles (13 km^{2}) and can be observed from a paved, narrow, and steep one-mile trail. The area was designated as the Lava Cast Forest Geological Area in April 1942 by the United States Forest Service, which included 5,120 acres (20.7 km^{2}) of land in the region. Known to the American public since 1928, by the mid-1940s the Lava Cast Forest was visited by thousands of tourists each year. In the mid-1970s, the region had 150,000 tourist visitors annually, with the Lava Lands Visitors Center built by the Forest Service in September 1975.

The trail to the volcano's summit at Paulina Peak lasts 15.5 miles (24.9 km) from Highway 97, with an easy paved road to the caldera and four rest stops, though it grows steep and twisty near the end. The winding trail near the end is made of gravel and lasts for three miles, offering views of Mount Hood, Mount McLoughlin, and the Three Sisters volcanoes.

== Notes ==
- [a] Other sources list the elevation of Paulina Peak as 7,984 feet (2,434 m) or 7,986 feet (2,434 m).
- [b] At a depth of 93 miles (150 km) under Newberry, p- and s-wave velocities increase, which has been interpreted via tomography as the top of the subducting Juan de Fuca tectonic plate. This differs from earthquake data suggesting the surface of the plate lies at a depth of 56 to 62 miles (90 to 100 km).

== Sources ==
- Anderson, E. W.; Borman, M. M.; Krueger, W. C. (May 1998). The ecological provinces of Oregon: a treatise on the basic ecological geography of the state (Thesis). Oregon State University Oregon Agricultural Experiment Station. SR-990.
- Barr, T. (2012). Scenic Routes & Byways Oregon. Rowman & Littlefield. ISBN 978-0-7627-7956-7.
- Bernstein, A. (2003). Oregon Byways: 75 Scenic Drives in the Cascades and Siskuiyous, Canyons and Coast. Wilderness Press. ISBN 978-0-89997-277-0.
- Carlson, R. W.; Grove, T. L.; Donnelly-Nolan, J. M. (April 2018). "Origin of primitive tholeiitic and calc-alkaline basalts at Newberry Volcano, Oregon". Geochemistry, Geophysics, Geosystems. 19 (4): 1360–1377. Bibcode:2018GGG....19.1360C. doi:10.1029/2018GC007454.
- Donnelly-Nolan, J. M.; Jensen, R. A. (2009). "Ice and water on Newberry Volcano, central Oregon". In O'Connor, J. E.; Dorsey, R. J.; Madin, I. P. (eds.). Volcanoes to Vineyards: Geologic Field Trips through the Dynamic Landscape of the Pacific Northwest: Geological Society of America Field Guide 15. Geological Society of America. pp. 1–10. doi:10.1130/2009.fld015(04). ISBN 978-0-8137-0015-1.
- Donnelly-Nolan, J. M.; Stovall, W. K.; Ramsey, D. W.; Ewert, J. W.; Jensen, R. A. (2011). Hendley II, J. W. (ed.). Newberry Volcano – Central Oregon's Sleeping Giant: USGS Fact Sheet 2011–3145 (PDF). United States Geological Survey.
- Dzurisin, D. (1999). "Results of repeated leveling surveys at Newberry Volcano, Oregon, and near Lassen Peak Volcano, California". Bulletin of Volcanology. 61 (1–2): 83–91. Bibcode:1999BVol...61...83D. doi:10.1007/s004450050264. S2CID 129103600.
- Graham, D. W.; Reid, M. R.; Jordan, B. T.; Grunder, A. L.; Leeman, W. P.; Lupton, J. E. (2009). "Mantle source provinces beneath the Northwestern USA delimited by helium isotopes in young basalts". Journal of Volcanology and Geothermal Research. 188 (1–3): 128–140. Bibcode:2009JVGR..188..128G. doi:10.1016/j.jvolgeores.2008.12.004.
- Harris, S. L. (2005). "Chapter 12: Newberry Volcano". Fire Mountains of the West: The Cascade and Mono Lake Volcanoes (Third ed.). Mountain Press Publishing Company. pp. 167–178. ISBN 978-0-87842-511-2.
- Jensen, R. A. (2009), "A field guide to Newberry Volcano, Oregon" (PDF), A field guide to Newberry Volcano, Oregon; The Geological Society of America, Field Guide 15, pp. 53–79, doi:10.1130/2009.fld015(03), ISBN 978-0-8137-0015-1.
- Jensen, R. A.; Donnelly-Nolan, J. M. (2017). "Field-trip guide to the geologic highlights of Newberry Volcano, Oregon". Field-trip guide to the geologic highlights of Newberry Volcano, Oregon: Scientific Investigations Report 2017-5022-J2. United States Geological Survey. p. 30. doi:10.3133/sir20175022J2.
- Jordan, B. T.; Grunder, A. L.; Duncan, R. A.; Deino, A. L. (2004). "Geochronology of age-progressive volcanism of the Oregon High Lava Plains: Implications for the plume interpretation of Yellowstone" (PDF). Journal of Geophysical Research. 109 (B10202): B10202. Bibcode:2004JGRB..10910202J. doi:10.1029/2003JB002776.
- Kienle, J.; Wood, C. A., eds. (1992). Volcanoes of North America: United States and Canada. Cambridge University Press. ISBN 978-0-521-43811-7.
- McKay, D.; Donnelly-Nolan, J. M.; Jensen, R. A.; Champion, D. E. (2009). "The post-Mazama northwest rift zone eruption at Newberry Volcano, Oregon". In O'Connor, J. E.; Dorsey, R. J.; Madin, I. P. (eds.). Volcanoes to Vineyards: Geologic Field Trips through the Dynamic Landscape of the Pacific Northwest: Geological Society of America Field Guide 15. Geological Society of America. pp. 91–110. doi:10.1130/2009.fld015(05). ISBN 978-0-8137-0015-1.
- Nelson, P. L.; Grand, S. P. (March 2018). "Lower-mantle plume beneath the Yellowstone hotspot revealed by core waves". Nature Geoscience. 11 (4): 280–284. Bibcode:2018NatGe..11..280N. doi:10.1038/s41561-018-0075-y. S2CID 134362624.
- Ostertag, R.; Ostertag, G. (2013). Camping Oregon: A Comprehensive Guide to Public Tent and RV Campgrounds. Rowman & Littlefield. ISBN 978-0-7627-8158-4.
- Phinney, W. C. (2015), Science Training History of the Apollo Astronauts (PDF), NASA, pp. 220–223, NASA/SP-2015-626.
- Pohl, K. A.; Hadley, K. S.; Arabas, K. B. (December 2006). "Decoupling tree-ring signatures of climate variation, fire, and insect outbreaks in central Oregon" (PDF). Tree-Ring Research. 62 (2): 37–51. doi:10.3959/1536-1098-62.2.37. hdl:10150/262623. S2CID 30880642.
- Sherrod, D. R.; Mastin, L. G.; Scott, W. E.; Schilling, S. P. (1997), Volcano Hazards at Newberry Volcano, Oregon, vol. Open-File Report 99-311, United States Geological Survey, p. 16.
- Shinderman, M. (August 2015). "American pika in a low-elevation lava landscape: expanding the known distribution of a temperature-sensitive species". Ecology and Evolution. 5 (17): 3666–3676. Bibcode:2015EcoEv...5.3666S. doi:10.1002/ece3.1626. PMC 4567870. PMID 26380695.
- Tamburello, R. (February 1997). "Oregon's Newberry Volcano". Backpacker. Vol. 25, no. 156. Active Interest Media. pp. 88–89. ISSN 0277-867X.
- Till, C. B.; Grove, T. L.; Carlson, R. W.; Donnelly-Nolan, J. M.; Fouch, M. J.; Wagner, L. S.; Hart, W. K. (April 2013). "Depths and temperatures of <10.5 Ma mantle melting and the lithosphere-asthenosphere boundary below southern Oregon and northern California". Geochemistry, Geophysics, Geosystems. 14 (4): 864. Bibcode:2013GGG....14..864T. doi:10.1002/ggge.20070. hdl:1721.1/85581.
- Walker, G. W. (July 1974). "Some implications of late Cenozoic volocanism to geothermal potential in the High Lava Plains of south-central Oregon" (PDF). Ore Bin. Open-File Report. 36 (7): 109–119. Bibcode:1974usgs.rept..140W. doi:10.3133/ofr741121. Archived from the original on March 5, 2012.
- Xue, M.; Allen, R. M. (2006). "Origin of the Newberry Hotspot Track: Evidence from shear-wave splitting" (PDF). Earth and Planetary Science Letters. 244 (1–2): 315–322. Bibcode:2006E&PSL.244..315X. doi:10.1016/j.epsl.2006.01.066.
