= Lava Butte =

Cinder cone in central Oregon, United States

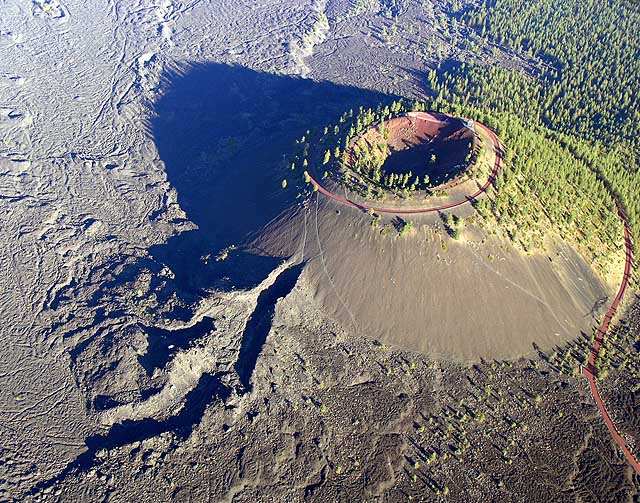

Highest point
- Elevation: 5,023 ft (1,531 m) NAVD 88
- Prominence: 509 ft (155 m)
- Coordinates: 43°55′04″N 121°21′22″W

Geography
- Location within Oregon
- Location: Deschutes County, Oregon, U.S.
- Topo map: USGS Lava Butte

Geology
- Rock age: About 7,000 years
- Mountain type: Cinder cone
- Last eruption: About 7,000 years ago

Climbing
- Easiest route: Road

Lava Butte is a cinder cone in central Oregon, United States, just west of U.S. Route 97 between the towns of Bend, and Sunriver in Deschutes County. It is part of a system of small cinder cones on the northwest flank of Newberry Volcano, a massive shield volcano which rises to the southeast. The cinder cone is capped by a crater which extends about 60 feet (20 m) deep beneath its south rim, and 160 feet (50 m) deep from the 5,020-foot (1,530 m) summit on its north side. Lava Butte is part of the Newberry National Volcanic Monument.

== Volcanic history ==
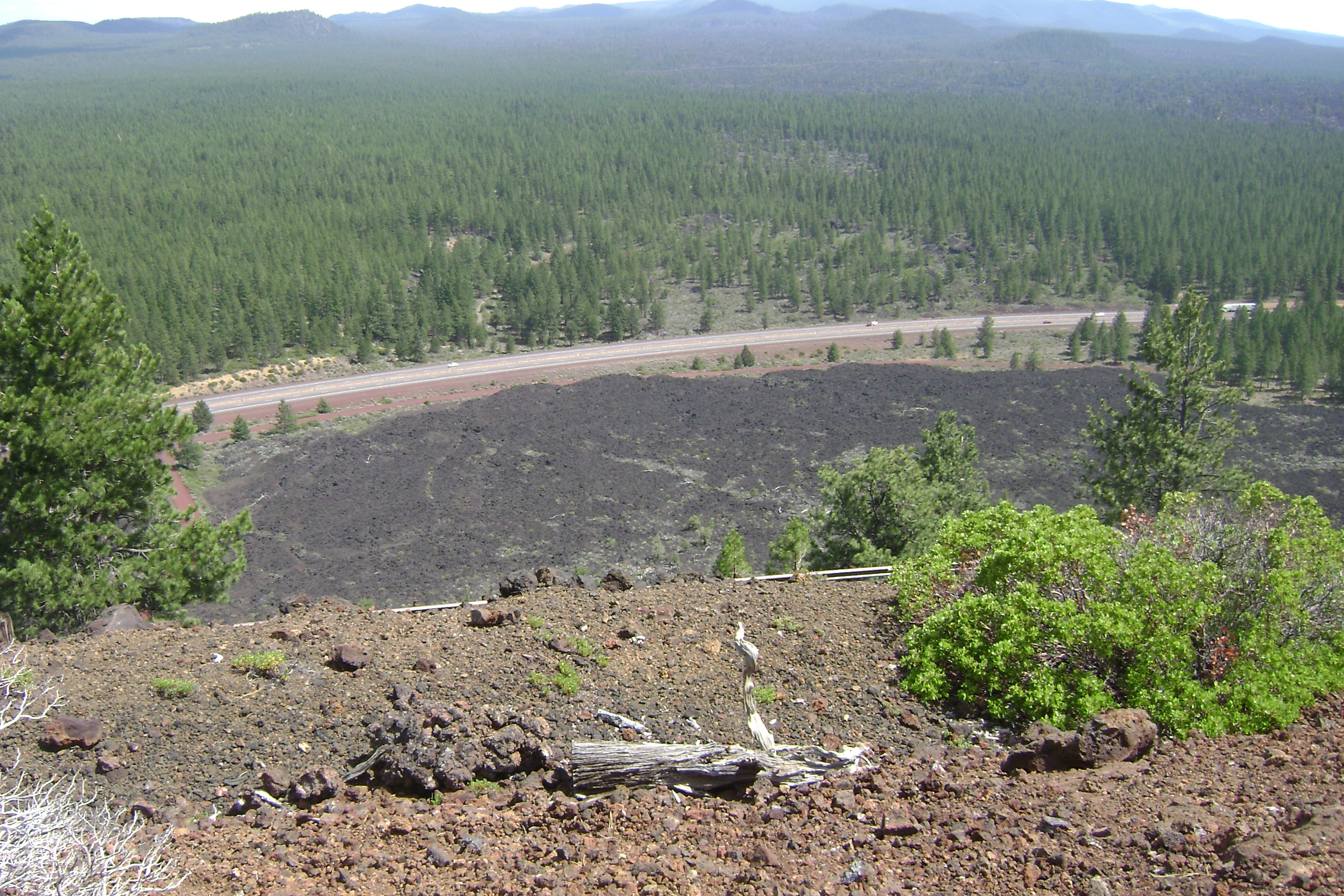
Visible from the top of Lava Butte is the black lava flow leading to Route 97.

Like the other cinder cones in the area, Lava Butte only experienced a single eruption, dated by geologists in 1977 to 6,150 carbon-14 years, equivalent to about 7,000 years ago. The eruption began with a fissure spewing hot cinders to form the cone. In the next phase, a river of hot basalt flowed from the base of the small volcano to cover a large area to the west with a lava flow which remains largely free of vegetation. The lava flows reached the Deschutes River about 2.5 miles (4.0 km) to the west of the cone, burying its former channel under over 100 feet (30 m) of lava and damming the river to form a lake, known as Lake Benham. The river eventually overflowed the lava dam and eroded down into it, draining the lake and forming Benham Falls. Geologists estimate that 90% of the magma erupted as lava flows, 9% as scoria which forms the cone, and 1% as volcanic ash which forms a thin layer extending to the north.

== Human history ==
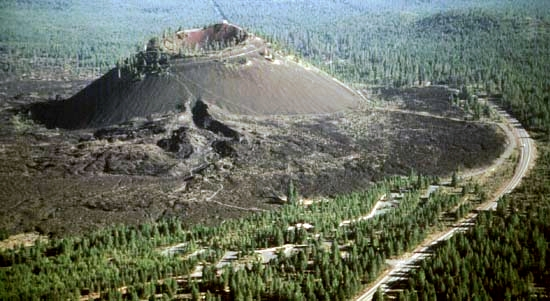
Lava Butte from the south

The early history of Lava Butte is not known, but it is assumed that Native Americans observed the eruptions and later ascended the prominent new landmark. White settlers arriving in the 1800s also noted the landmark. In 1903, I.C. Russell was the first geologist to study the butte and speculated that it erupted as recently as 150 years ago. Dr. Howel Williams estimated it to be much older, but incorrectly at 1,000 years old. In September 1914, Lava Butte "erupted" when the Bend Chamber of Commerce simulated an eruption to surprise a visiting Portland group. In 1925, USGS geologist Harold Stearns studied the Newberry area and recognized the fissure system which extends from Lava Butte to East Lake within Newberry Caldera.

Sometime after 1901, the Great Northern Railway was extended south through the area. The construction crew built the rail line directly through the ʻAʻā lava flow of Lava Butte.

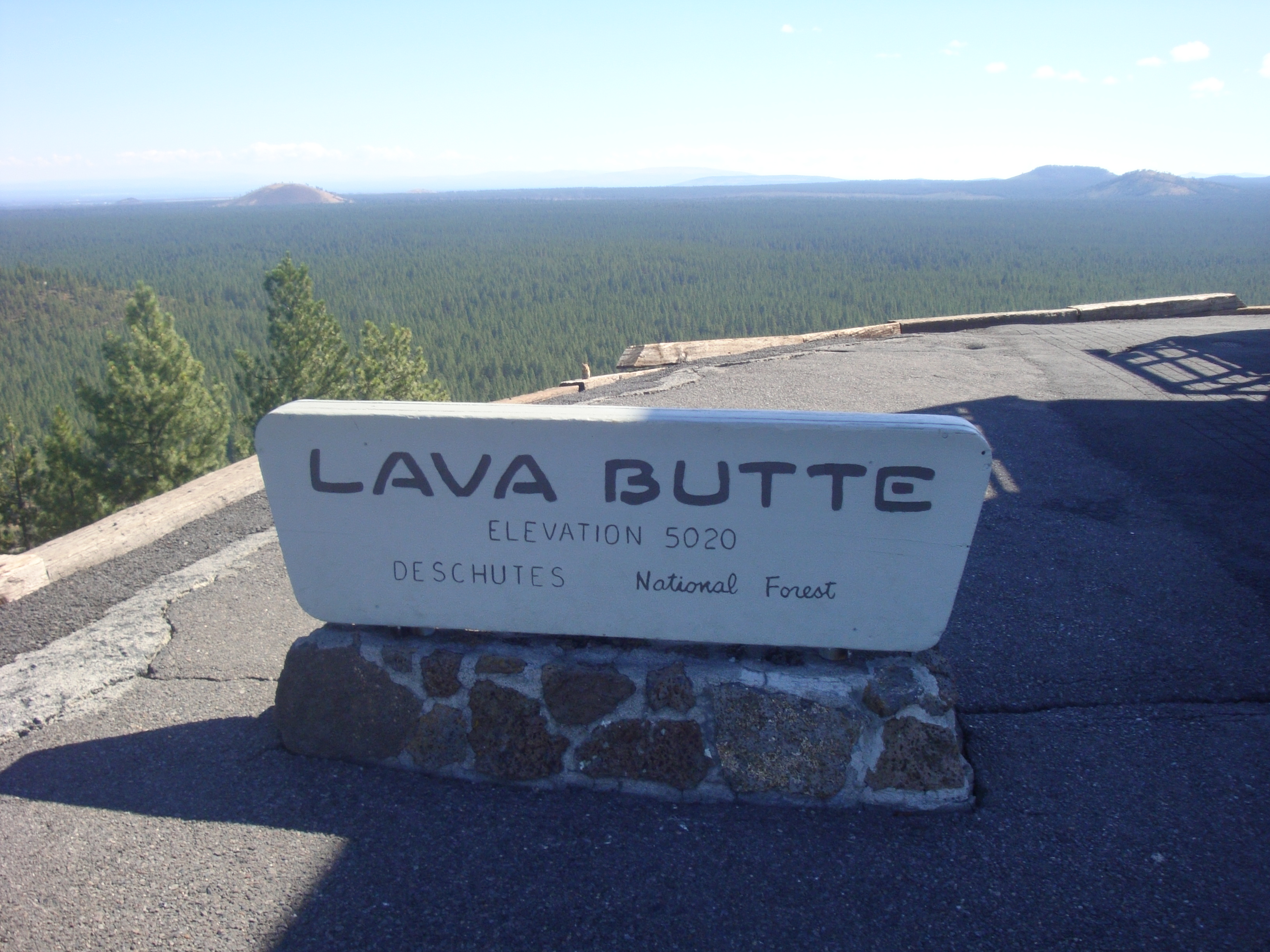
Sign at the summit of the butte

The cinder cone was also exploited to some extent for its economic value. In June 1926, a quarry was developed in the fault scarp east of Lava Butte as a source for paving material for the first The Dalles-California Highway (later U.S. Route 97). In November 1929, cinders from Lava Butte were shipped to Longview, Washington, to be used in construction of Longview Bridge across Columbia River.

A United States Forest Service fire lookout tower was built on the summit in 1931, and in early 1933 a steep, single-lane road was constructed spiraling up to the summit. In February of that year, the local Skyliners ski club proposed a ski jump on Lava Butte, but it was never built. In June 1946, widening of the road up Lava Butte to two lanes was completed, along with constructing two small parking lots at the summit. The road was later paved in July 1950. The original lookout was replaced with a larger one in 1957, which was subsequently enlarged in 1962 to accommodate a small visitor center and museum on the first floor. In 1998 this was replaced with a new lookout built in the original L-4 style of 1931.

In July 1966, twenty-two astronauts trained in Central Oregon for the upcoming Moon landings, at sites including Lava Butte, Lava River Cave, and Newberry Crater. In May 1967 the U.S. Forest Service created the 8,983 acres (3,635 ha) Lava Butte Geological Area to protect the cinder cone, with plans for recreational and interpretive development. Construction of the Lava Lands Visitor Center located just south of the cone began in April 1969 and it was finally dedicated in September 1975. In November 1990, Newberry National Volcanic Monument was created encompassing Newberry Crater, Lava Cast Forest Geological Area, Lava River Cave, and the Lava Butte Geological Area.

From early May to mid October, a shuttle transports visitors up Red Cinder Road from the Lava Lands Visitor Center to the lookout on Lava Butte. Hiking up Red Cinder Road is a year-round option. A scenic rim trail around the top of Lava Butte is 0.35 miles (0.56 km) long.
