= East Lake (Oregon) =

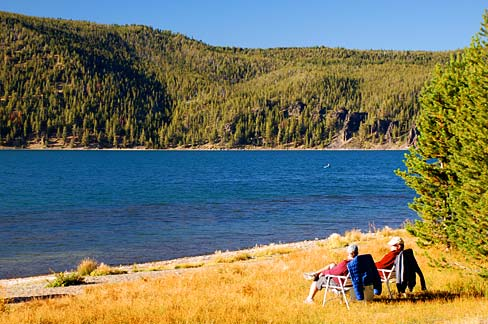
- Visitors at East Lake Campground

- Location within Oregon Location within the United States
- Location: Newberry National Volcanic Monument, Deschutes County, Oregon
- Coordinates: 43°43′45″N 121°12′49″W
- Type: Lake
- Basin countries: United States
- Surface area: 1,044 acres (4.2 km^{2})
- Average depth: 67 ft (20 m)
- Max. depth: 180 ft (55 m)
- Surface elevation: 6,381 ft (1,945 m)

East Lake is one of the twin lakes that occupy part of the Newberry Crater or caldera in Central Oregon, United States. It is located in the Deschutes National Forest near the city of La Pine. The caldera was formed over 500,000 years ago from volcanic eruptions. East Lake's water comes from snow melt, rainfall, and hot springs only. The average depth is 67 feet (20 m), 180 feet (55 m) at the deepest point, and covers 1,044 acres (4.2 km^{2}). East Lake is about 50 feet (15 m) higher in elevation and is to the east of its twin, Paulina Lake.

East Lake has two main camping grounds along the lake shore as well as East Lake Resort. The resort has cabins and boats for rent, as well as a general store.

Trout were first stocked in the lake in 1912. The lake offers fishing for brown trout, rainbow trout., Kokanee, and Atlantic Salmon. East Lake is one of the finest and most traditional fisheries in Oregon, regularly producing brown trout over 10 pounds. The lake record for brown trout is 22.5 pounds (or 10.2 kilograms).

The early 1920s marked the first documented occurrence of tui chub (Gila Siphateles), a non-native cyprinid species, in East Lake. The method of introduction was most likely the release or loss of these fish as a result of live bait fisheries. Tui chub reproduce quickly and compete with rainbow trout and Kokanee for food.

The Oregon Department of Fish and Wildlife (ODFW) has used an ongoing two-prong approach to try to reduce and control tui chub numbers: trapping and removing tui chub when they gather on the shallow spawning grounds in the early summer, and introducing a top-tier predator, Blackwater trout, (a Canadian strain of rainbow trout) that will eat tui chub. Between 2010 and 2013, the agency and local volunteers removed 48,500 pounds of tui chub from the lake (approximately 250,000 fish) with funding from the agency’s Fish Restoration and Enhancement Fund and matching funds from local angling clubs, OSU Cascades, and local resorts.

== See also ==
- List of lakes in Oregon
