= Deschutes Land Trust =

American conservation organization

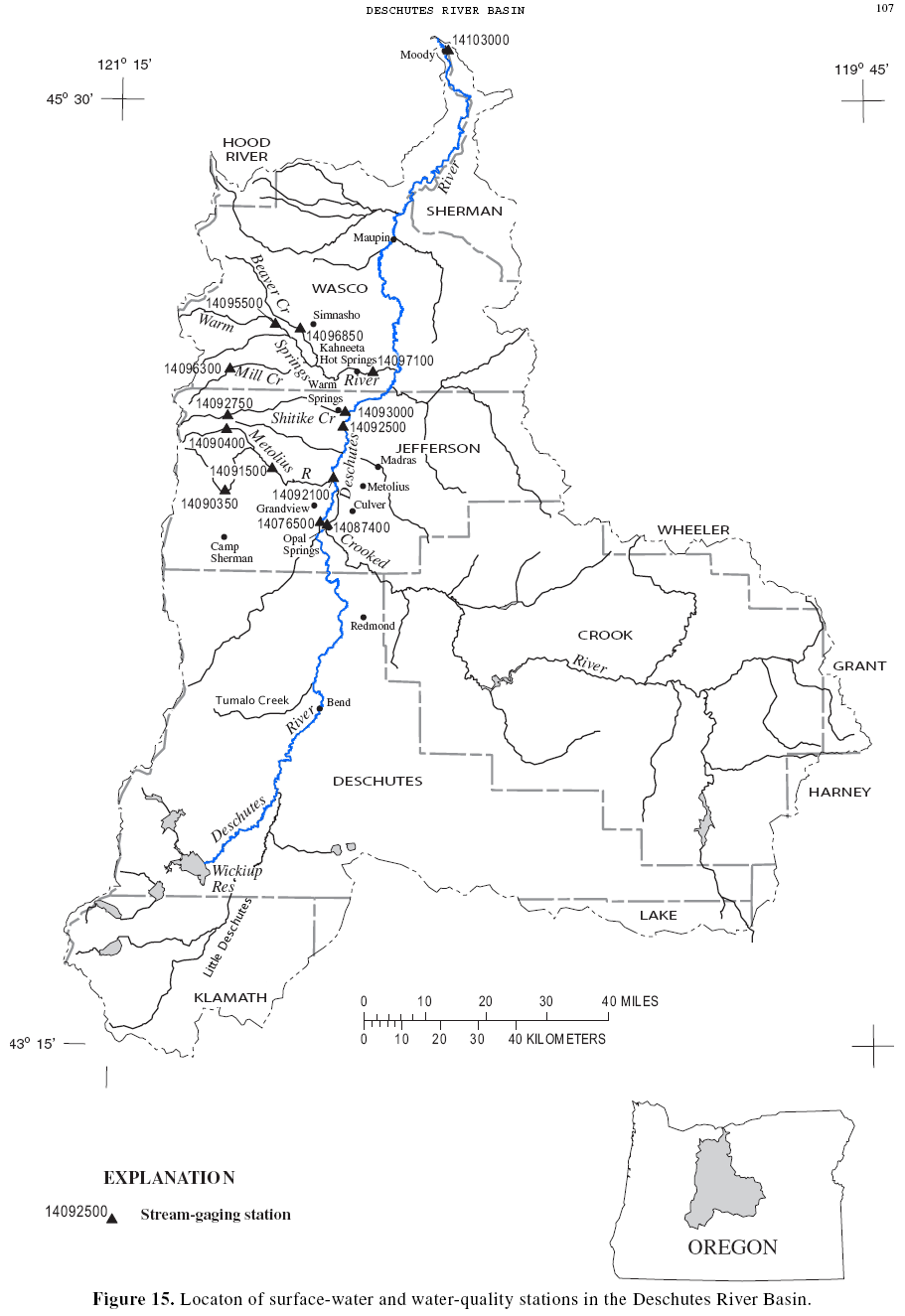
- Deschutes River Watershed
- Predecessor: Deschutes Basin Land Trust
- Formation: 1995
- Type: Nonprofit
- Headquarters: Bend, Oregon, US
- Region served: Central Oregon
- Website: www.deschuteslandtrust.org

The Deschutes Land Trust (formerly "Deschutes Basin Land Trust") is a private charitable conservation organization focused on preserving natural landscapes and rivers in the Deschutes River Basin in Oregon, US. The Trust was formed in 1995, and since then has grown to conserve more than 7,000 hectares (17,000 acres) of land in over 17 preserves.

== Background ==
The Deschutes Basin Land Trust was established in 1995, with the purpose of protecting important natural lands in the Deschutes River drainage from development through acquisitions and/or conservation agreements. In 2008, the Trust's name was shortened to "Deschutes Land Trust." The Trust acquired its first preserve, Indian Ford Meadow Preserve, in 1996 with help from the Oregon Community Foundation. By 1999, the Trust was reported to be the largest land trust in Oregon. The Trust has been accredited by the Land Trust Accreditation Commission.

== Mission ==
The Deschutes Land Trust focuses on working with willing landowners to conserve land for wildlife, scenic views and local communities. The Trust has a mission "to conserve and care for the lands and waters that sustain Central Oregon, so local communities and the natural world can flourish together for generations to come." This mission is accomplished via three tasks: 1) conserving land in perpetuity via voluntary land protection agreements (conservation easements), land donations, or land purchases; 2) caring for these protected lands; and 3) connecting the local (human) community to the land via land visitation, volunteer conservation opportunities, and nature education.

== Conserved lands ==
As of 2021, Deschutes Land Trust conserves over 7,000 hectares (17,000 acres) of land in more than 17 properties. An initial focus was protecting lands along Whychus Creek, culminating in a "Campaign for Whychus Creek" that focused on completing the Trust's conservation strategy for the creek. The trust currently manages nine properties in the Whychus basin. Other areas of focus include the Metolius River and the Crooked River. The Trust also conserves lands elsewhere in the upper Deschutes River basin.

== Stewardship ==
Through partnerships with conservation and community groups, native tribes, state and federal agencies, universities, and others, the Trust works to preserve watershed function, protect migration corridors, and improve connectivity for fish and wildlife species. Stewardship activities focus on wetlands, riparian habitats, forests, and other uplands, as well as specialized habitats for vulnerable species and lands that are intrinsically valuable to local communities.

== Community outreach ==
Many of the preserves are accessible to the public for recreation, nature appreciation, and education. The Trust provides both volunteer opportunities and guided visitations. The Trust owns nine "Community Preserves" in Central Oregon that are open for public enjoyment and exploration:

- Aspen Hollow Preserve
- Camp Polk Meadow Preserve
- Indian Ford Meadow Preserve
- Metolius Preserve
- Metolius River Preserve
- Ochoco Preserve
- Thomas Preserve
- Whychus Canyon Preserve
- Willow Springs Preserve
