= Metolius Preserve =

Conservation preserve

- IUCN category IV (habitat/species management area)
- Location within Oregon
- Location: Jefferson County, Oregon, USA
- Nearest city: Sisters, Oregon
- Coordinates: 44.43°N 121.70°W
- Area: 1,240 acres (500 ha)
- Established: 2003
- Governing body: Deschutes Land Trust
- Website: www.deschuteslandtrust.org

Metolius Preserve is a conservation preserve owned and managed by the Deschutes Land Trust. It is located near Camp Sherman in Jefferson County, Oregon, USA. Conservation values include old-growth ponderosa pine forest providing habitat for sensitive plants and wildlife, and three segments of Lake Creek with salmon and trout spawning and migration habitat. The Preserve is open to the public for education and recreation. For access information, see the Preserve website (External Links).

== Background ==
Metolius Preserve consists of 1,240 acres (502 ha) in three parcels located near US Highway 20 between Suttle Lake and Camp Sherman in Jefferson County, Oregon, USA. Deschutes Land Trust began raising funds to purchase the property from Willamette Industries in 2002, shortly before they were taken over by Weyerhaeuser Company. The purchase was completed in July 2003.

== Conservation ==
The Preserve is primarily forest and woodland with ponderosa pine, Douglas fir, western larch, and other conifers with a rich understory, providing habitat for sensitive plants and wildlife, including white-headed woodpecker and Peck's penstemon. The Preserve supports old-growth ponderosa pine forest. Restoration activities focus on forests (thinning, road removal, and revegetation), streams (culvert removal, habitat preservation) and invasive weed control.

The north, middle, and south forks of Lake Creek (a tributary of the Metolius River) flow through the property. These creeks provide prime spawning habitat for Redband Trout, spring-run Chinook Salmon and Steelhead Trout as well as providing a migration corridor for Sockeye Salmon. All anadromous fish were blocked from the Metolius River by Round Butte Dam in the 1960s, until a new fish passage facility became operational in 2010, with the first adult salmon returning to the basin in 2012.

One interesting conservation approach at Metolius Preserve is the use of bark beetles to improve wildlife habitat. Use of Mountain pine beetles (Dendroctonus ponderosae) attractants has encouraged the beetles to selectively kill targeted trees and has successfully created snags that provide increased nesting opportunities for birds and small mammals.

== Public Usage ==
The Preserve is open to the public with several hiking trails, and is recognized as a local hotspot for bird watching. The land trust leads educational hikes at the Preserve, and has provided public school outdoor education field trips. For access information, see the Preserve website (External Links).
