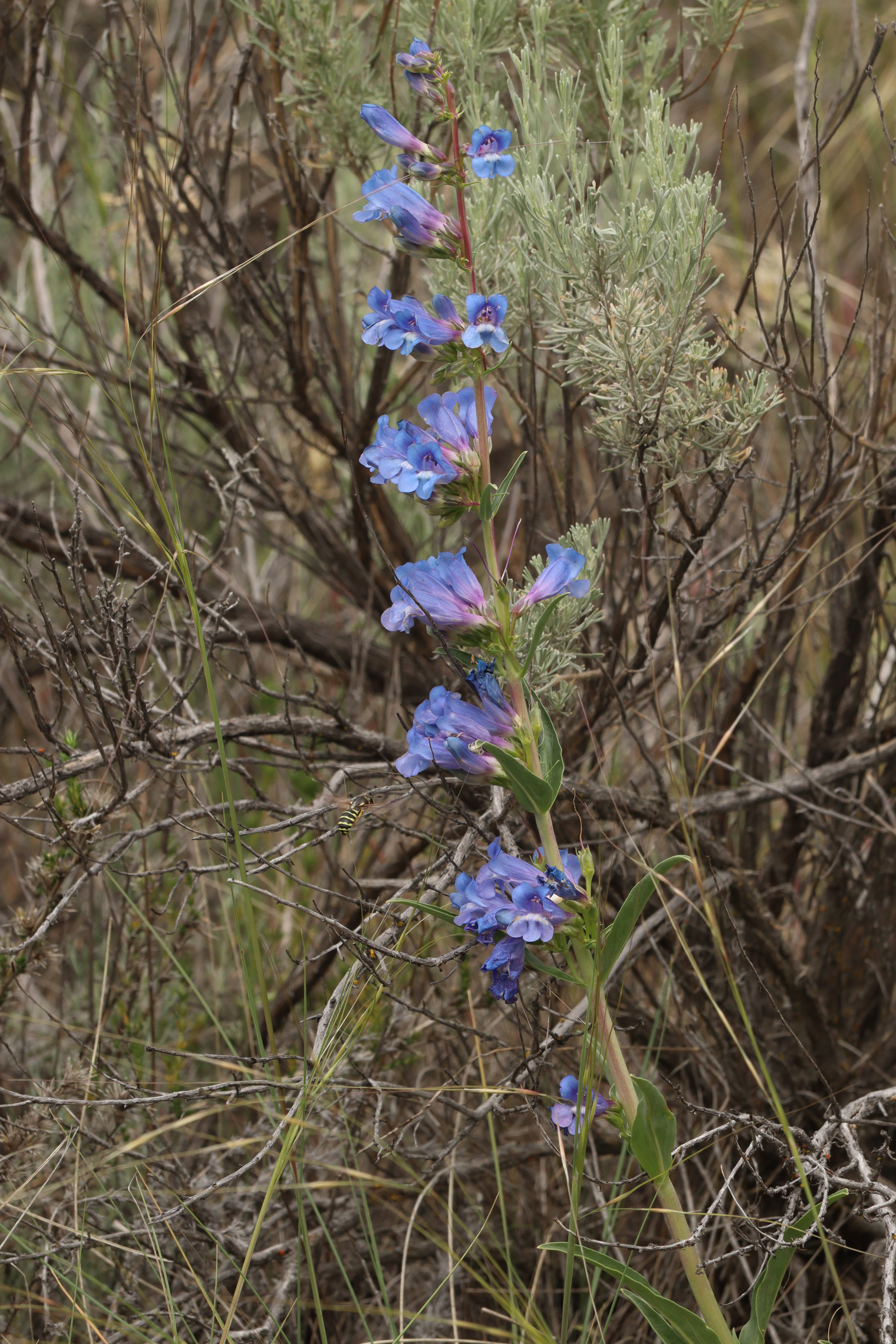

Conservation status
- Secure (NatureServe)

Scientific classification
- Kingdom: Plantae
- Clade: Embryophytes
- Clade: Tracheophytes
- Clade: Angiosperms
- Clade: Eudicots
- Clade: Asterids
- Order: Lamiales
- Family: Plantaginaceae
- Genus: Penstemon
- Species: P. speciosus

Binomial name
- Penstemon speciosus Dougl. ex Lindl.

= Penstemon speciosus =

Species of flowering plant

Penstemon speciosus is a species of penstemon known by the common name royal penstemon of western North America.

== Description ==
It is a perennial herb growing erect to a maximum height near 2–9 decimetres (7 3/4–35 1/2 in). The leaves are usually lance-shaped and sometimes folded lengthwise, usually less than 15 cm (6 in) long. They are arranged oppositely and often clasp the stem at the bases. The showy inflorescence bears tubular flowers with expanded mouths 26–38 mm (1–1 1/2 in) long. The flowers are light to deep blue, lavender, and purple, and usually have white throats. The white, generally hairless, throat helps to distinguish it from similar species within its range.

== Distribution ==
Native to the western United States, it is most common east of the crest of the Cascade Range of Washington and Oregon; southern Idaho; mountainous California from the Klamath Ranges along the High Sierra Nevada to the Western Transverse Ranges, San Gabriel and San Bernardino Mountains; and scattered through the mountains of northern Nevada. It is associated with diverse habitats, from sagebrush scrub, plateau and foothill scrub to subalpine mountain forests. It spans a range of elevations but is most common from 900–2,700 metres (3,000–9,000 ft).

== Ecology ==
The caterpillars of the variable checkerspot (Euphydryas chalcedona macglashanii) and the anicia checkerspot (Euphydryas anicia subspecies veazieae and wheeleri) feed on royal penstemons.
