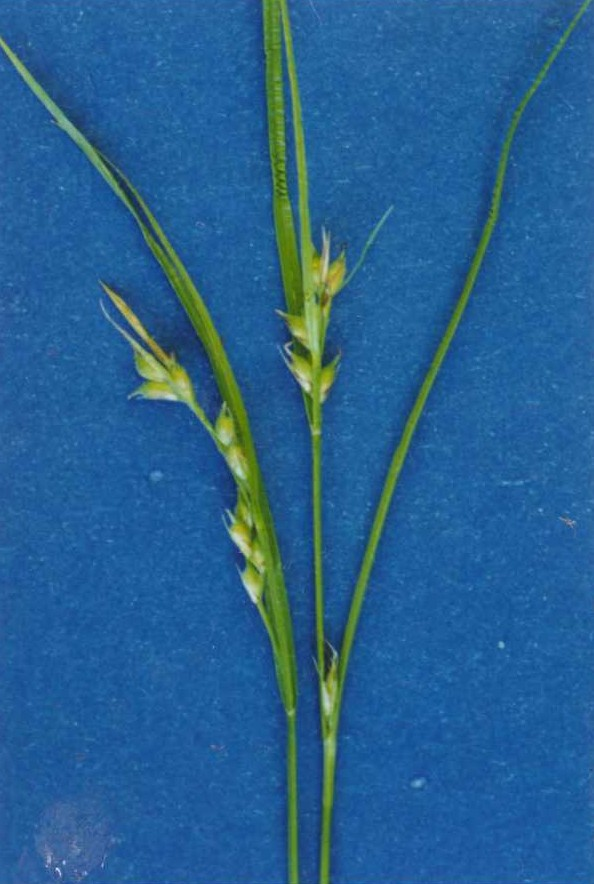

Conservation status
- Least Concern (IUCN 3.1)

Scientific classification
- Kingdom: Plantae
- Clade: Tracheophytes
- Clade: Angiosperms
- Clade: Monocots
- Clade: Commelinids
- Order: Poales
- Family: Cyperaceae
- Genus: Carex
- Subgenus: Carex subg. Carex
- Section: Carex sect. Acrocystis
- Species: C. rossii

Binomial name
- Carex rossii Boott

Synonyms
- List: Carex brevipes W.Boott ex B.D.Jacks.; C. deflexa var. farwellii Britton; C. d. var. media L.H.Bailey; C. d. var. rossii (Boott) L.H.Bailey; C. diversistylis A.Roach; C. farwellii (Britton) Mack.; C. novae-angliae var. rossii (Boott ex Hooker) L.H.Bailey

= Carex rossii =

Species of grass-like plant

Carex rossii, commonly known as Ross's sedge, is a hardy species of sedge that is often a pioneer species in areas with little or no established vegetation, or in places where disturbance has occurred. Ross's sedge grows in a variety of habitats throughout much of western North America, from Alaska to Ontario, south to New Mexico and California. It flowers in May and June.

== Taxonomy ==
Carex rossii was first described by Francis Boott in Hooker's Flora Boreali-Americana (1839). The type locality was listed as "Hab. N. W. Coast. Douglas. Rocky Mountains. Drummond" (sic)".

== Description ==
Carex rossii produces a dense clump, or solid mat of slender stems up to about 40 centimetres (16 in) from a shallow network of rhizomes. The pale to dark green leaves are usually longer than the stems. The inflorescences contain one or more staminate flower spikes above more rounded pistillate spikes. The fruit is three-sided, and covered in a greenish or brownish perigynium.

== Distribution and habitat ==
Carex rossii is native to, and sometimes abundant in, Alaska and subarctic Canada (Nunavut, Northwest Territories, and Yukon Territory); western Canada (Alberta, British Columbia, Manitoba, and Saskatchewan); and the contiguous U.S. (Arizona, California, Colorado, the Dakotas, Idaho, Minnesota, Montana, Nevada, New Mexico, Oregon, Utah, Washington, and Wyoming.) It is found only sporadically in Ontario, Michigan, and Nebraska.

It grows in many habitat types, including wet and dry areas in forest, sagebrush, prairie, and alpine meadows.
