= Paulina Peak =

Mountain peak in Oregon

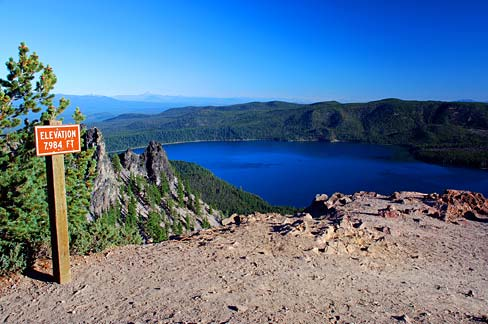

Highest point
- Elevation: 7,984 ft (2,434 m)
- Prominence: 3,220 ft (980 m)
- Coordinates: 43°41′21″N 121°15′17″W

Geography
- Location within Oregon
- Location: Deschutes County, Oregon, U.S.

Geology
- Rock age: Pleistocene or before
- Mountain type(s): Lava dome, volcanic mountain
- Volcanic arc: Cascade Volcanic Arc
- Last eruption: 400,000 years ago

Paulina Peak is a summit in Deschutes County, Oregon, United States. Formed by the Newberry Volcano, it is part of Newberry National Volcanic Monument. At an elevation of 7,984 feet (2,434 m), it is the highest point on the volcano. The peak gives a panoramic view of the Newberry Caldera, the south and west flanks of the Newberry Volcano, the Cascades, the Fort Rock Basin, and central Oregon. The Cascade Range can be seen extending into California (Mount Shasta) and Washington (Mount Adams) from the peak on a clear sunny day. Depending on weather and road conditions, the peak is typically accessible to visitors from early July until late October/early November.
