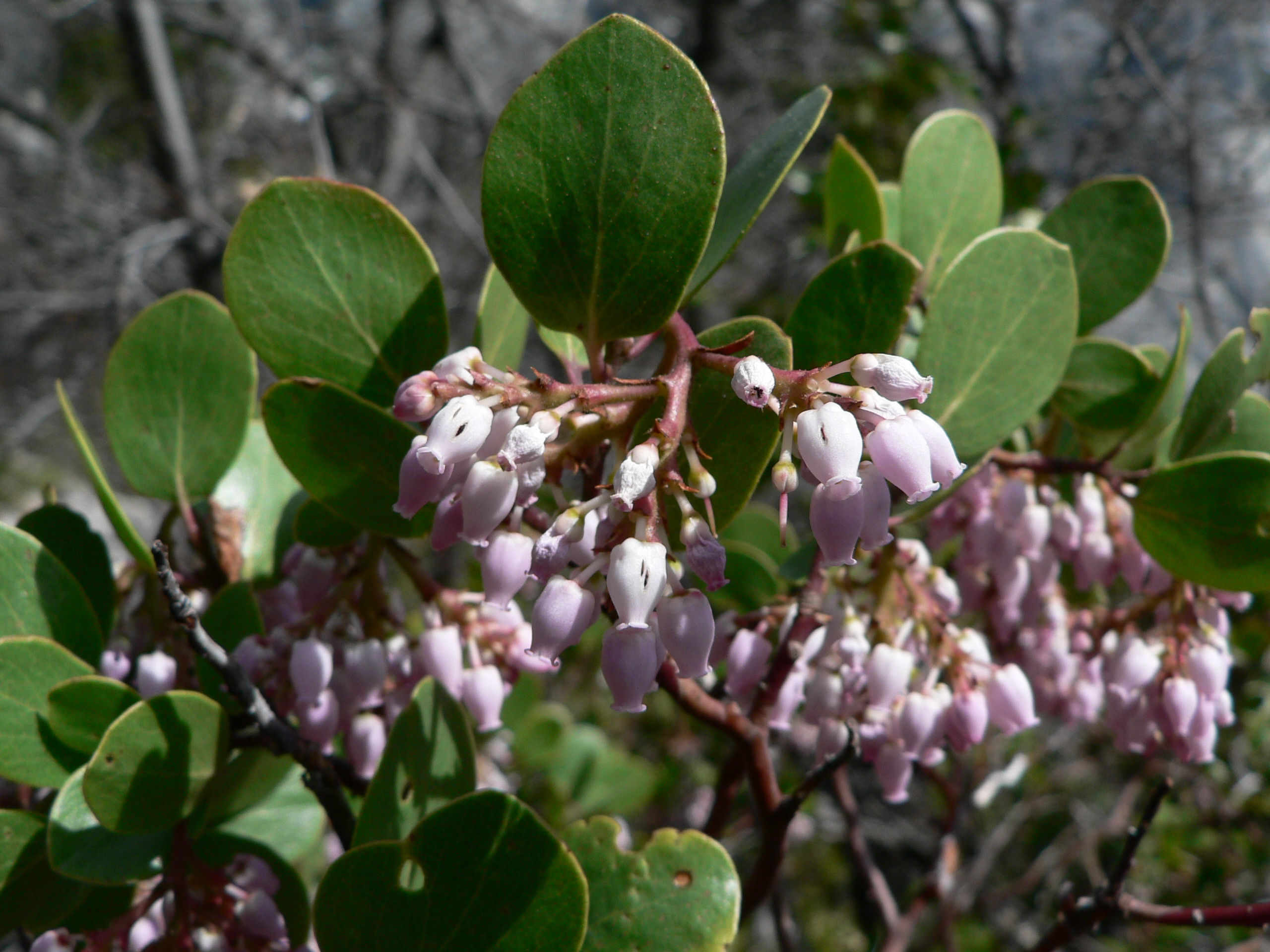

Conservation status
- Apparently Secure (NatureServe)

Scientific classification
- Kingdom: Plantae
- Clade: Embryophytes
- Clade: Tracheophytes
- Clade: Spermatophytes
- Clade: Angiosperms
- Clade: Eudicots
- Clade: Asterids
- Order: Ericales
- Family: Ericaceae
- Genus: Arctostaphylos
- Species: A. patula

Binomial name
- Arctostaphylos patula Greene

Subspecies
- Arctostaphylos patula subsp. gankinii M.C.Vasey & V.T.Parker; Arctostaphylos patula subsp. patula

Synonyms
- List: Arctostaphylos obtusifolia Piper (1902); Arctostaphylos parryana var. pinetorum (Rollins) Wiesl. & B.Schreib. (1939); Arctostaphylos patula var. coalescens W.Knight (1984); Arctostaphylos patula f. coalescens (W.Knight) P.V.Wells (1988); Arctostaphylos patula var. incarnata Jeps. (1922); Arctostaphylos patula f. platyphylla (A.Gray) P.V.Wells (1988); Arctostaphylos patula subsp. platyphylla (A.Gray) P.V.Wells (1968); Arctostaphylos pinetorum Rollins (1937); Arctostaphylos pungens var. platyphylla A.Gray (1878); Uva-ursi obtusifolia (Piper) A.Heller (1914); Uva-ursi patula (Greene) Abrams (1910)

= Arctostaphylos patula =

Greenleaf manzanita

Western North American species of manzanita

Arctostaphylos patula is a species of manzanita known by the common name greenleaf manzanita. This manzanita is native to western North America where it grows at moderate to high elevations.

== Description ==
This shrub reaches between 1 and 2 metres (3 1/2 and 6 1/2 feet) in height. It is low to the ground with some of the lower branches rooting in the soil and others extending more outward than upward. The stems are twisting and reddish-brown in color, and shiny due to glandular secretion. The petioles may sometimes have clear-to-glandular hairs. The leaves are oval-shaped to nearly round, and flat, shiny, and smooth. They are 6 centimetres (2 1/2 inches) long and up to 4 cm wide.

The plentiful flowers are white to pink and urn-shaped, each with five small lobes at the mouth of the corolla, hanging in bunches. The fruits are dark brown drupes nearly a centimeter wide, each containing about five hard-coated seeds that can be fused. Seeds are primarily dispersed by seed-caching mammals, and sometimes the fruits are consumed and dispersed by birds and medium-to-large mammals such as bears, coyotes, coatis, and foxes. Seeds require fire followed by cold conditions to germinate; seeds can remain dormant in soil for hundreds of years.

Greenleaf manzanitas in some areas, but not all, produce lignotubers, from which they can reproduce vegetatively.

== Distribution and habitat ==
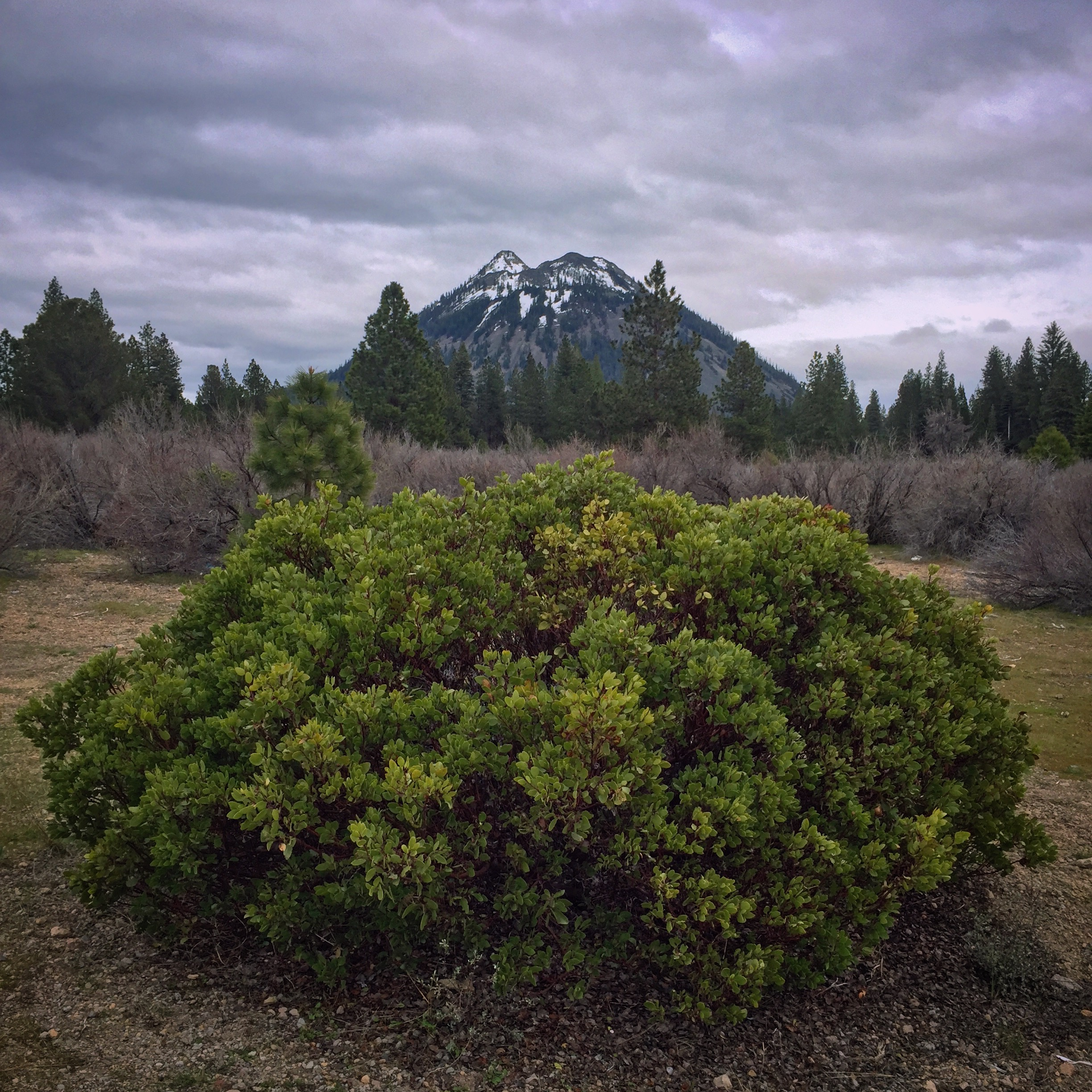
Arctostaphylos patula at the base of Black Butte, a volcanic vent of Mount Shasta (elevation 1,093 m or 3,586 ft)

The distribution of A. patula is one of the most widespread of the manzanitas, spanning most of western North America. Its northern edge is in Washington state, eastern edge in Colorado, western edge the North American west coast, and southernmost edge in Baja California, Mexico. It grows in coniferous forests from elevations of about 460 to 3,660 m (1,500 to 12,000 ft).

== Ecology ==
In addition to providing fruit for certain mammals, the species is an important browse plant for deer.

== Uses ==
Some Plateau Indian tribes drank a tea of greenleaf manzanita as a cathartic.
