= Lava Cast Forest =

Visitor destination in the state of Oregon

Coordinates: 43°49′2″N 121°17′19″W

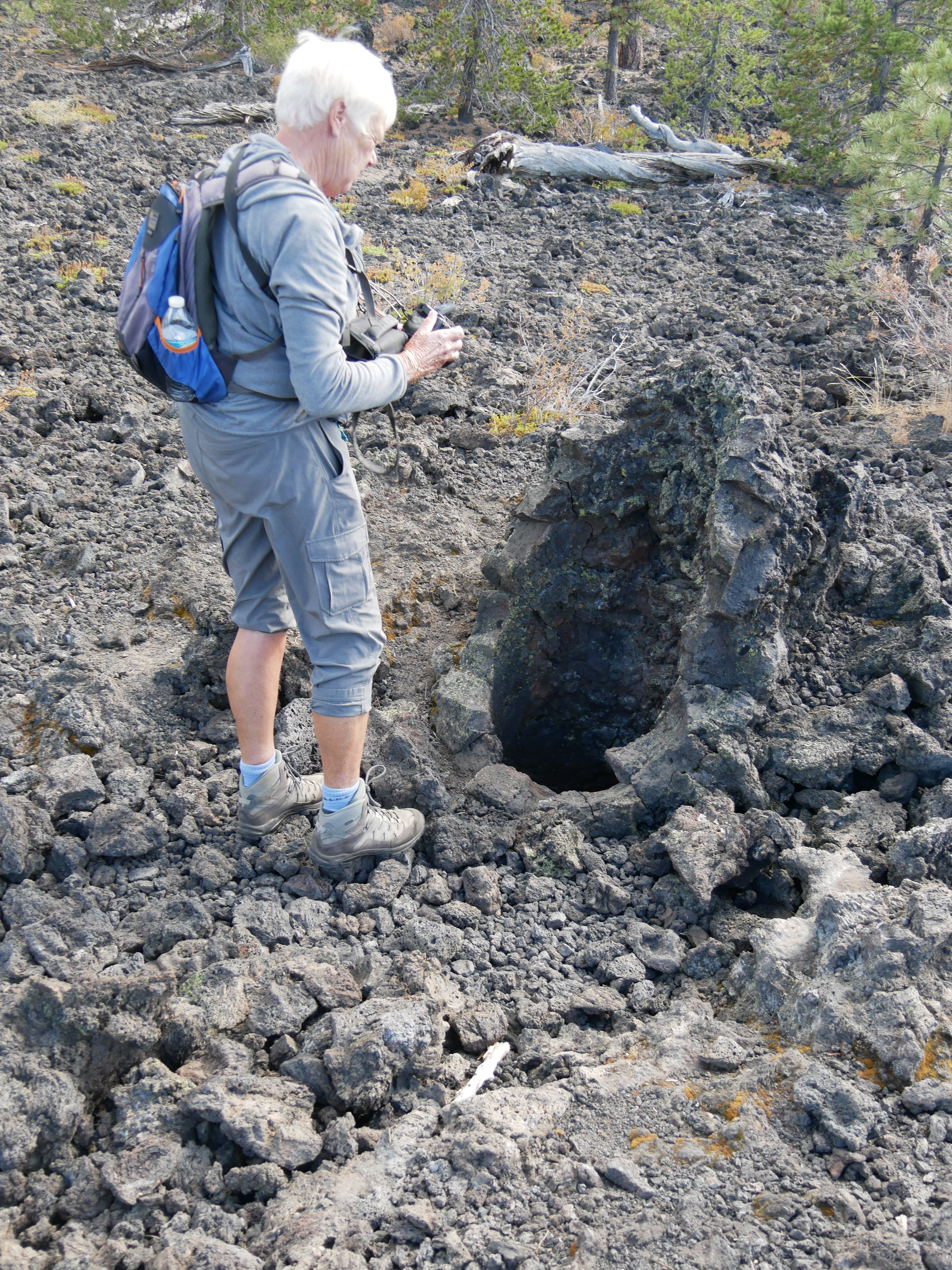
- Lava molds of ancient tree trunks

- Location within Oregon
- Location: Deschutes County, Oregon, United States
- Nearest city: Bend
- Established: April 1942

Lava Cast Forest is a visitor destination within the Newberry National Volcanic Monument near Bend, in the U.S. state of Oregon. It is a geologic feature containing a 6,000 year old lava flow that created lava molds of ancient trees. It's located about 25 total miles south of Bend and is accessible via a 9-mile (14 km) gravel road from U.S. Highway 97. The site includes paid parking and a paved interpretive loop trail, with some sections too narrow or steep for wheelchairs.

== Geology ==
The Lava Cast Forest area includes cinder cones and various lava flows, with the youngest flow at 6,000 years old. It created molds around preexisting tree trunks when the lava flowed around them. The molds were created when hot lava came into contact with trees, chilling the lava and created a protective covering, or mold. The trees then burnt completely out leaving a hollow interior. The molds can be vertical or horizontal, with some horizontal casts being up to 50 to 60 feet long. In some of the molds, the imprint of tree bark can be seen. Even ancient charcoal are still in some of the molds, and rings of annual tree growth can be seen in some. Originally, lumber company employees thought the molds were lava gas blowouts, until Walter J. Perry discovered the imprints of lava bark. Lava "drippings" found in freshly formed molds were created when lava dripped into the interior cavity.

== History ==
The area surrounding Lava Cast Forest was used heavily for lumber in the early 1900s. After Perry's discovery, the area received attention from all over the west part of the United States in 1928. At one point, vandals used dynamite to destroy some of the best casts as well as removing some for personal keeping. In 1942, the United States Forest Service designated 5,120 acres as part of the Lava Cast Forest Geological Area and were promoted as a tourist attraction.

In 1963, scientists from NASA became interested in the lava fields because they had very little erosion and they suspected it might be what they would find on the surface of the Moon. From 1964 to 1966, at least 46 astronauts trained for lunar missions in the area. James B. Irwin delivered a rock from one of Oregon's lava flows to the lunar surface to commemorate NASA's experiences in central Oregon.
