= Paulina Lake =

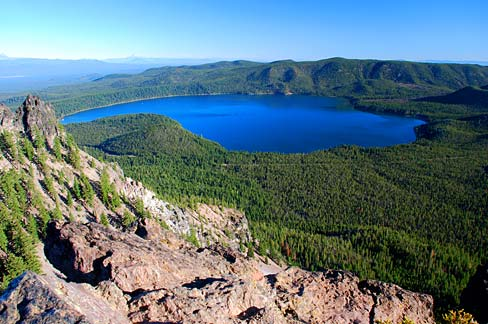
- View of Paulina Lake from Paulina Peak

- Location within Oregon Location within the United States
- Location: Newberry National Volcanic Monument, Deschutes County, Oregon, United States
- Coordinates: 43°42′48″N 121°16′29″W
- Type: Crater lake
- Primary inflows: Seepage
- Primary outflows: Paulina Creek
- Catchment area: 17.1 mi^{2} (44.3 km^{2})
- Basin countries: United States
- Surface area: 1,531 acres (619.6 ha)
- Average depth: 163 ft (49.7 m)
- Max. depth: 250 ft (76.2 m)
- Water volume: 249,850 acre⋅ft (308,185 dam^{3})
- Residence time: 46 years
- Shore length^{1}: 6.7 mi (11 km)
- Surface elevation: 6,331 ft (1,930 m)
- ^{1} Shore length is not a well-defined measure.

Paulina Lake is one of the twin crater lakes in Newberry Crater, central Oregon, United States (the other being East Lake). It is located 6,331 feet (1,930 m) above sea level in the Newberry National Volcanic Monument near La Pine. The lake's primary inflow is seepage from East Lake, snow melt, and hot springs, and its outflow is Paulina Creek, a tributary of the Little Deschutes River. It has an area of 1,531 acres (619.6 ha), a volume of 249,850 acre-feet (308,185 dam^{3}), a maximum depth of 250 feet (76.2 m), a shore length of about 6.7 miles (11 km), and a residence time of about 46 years. The lake is classified as mesotrophic, with a transparency of approximately 13.1 feet (3.99 m). It is about 40 feet (12 m) lower and one mile west of its twin, East Lake.

Paulina Lake sits within the Newberry Crater, formed from over 500,000 years of volcanic activity.

The lake bears the name of Paulina, a Northern Paiute leader.

== Recreational activities ==
Paulina Lake supports a number of recreational activities, including camping, hiking, fishing, kayaking, canoeing and paddle-boarding. A 10 mph speed limit on the lake prohibits motorized high speed watersports such as waterskiing and jet skis, which protects the lake as a popular fishing destination.

Once devoid of fish, the lake is now regularly stocked by the Oregon Department of Fish and Wildlife, and is known for its large number of kokanee salmon and brown trout. Other fish found in the lake include rainbow trout, tui chub, and blue chub. The largest brown trout caught on record in the State of Oregon – weighing in at 28 lb., 5 oz. – was caught at Paulina in 2002, eclipsing previous records set at the same lake.

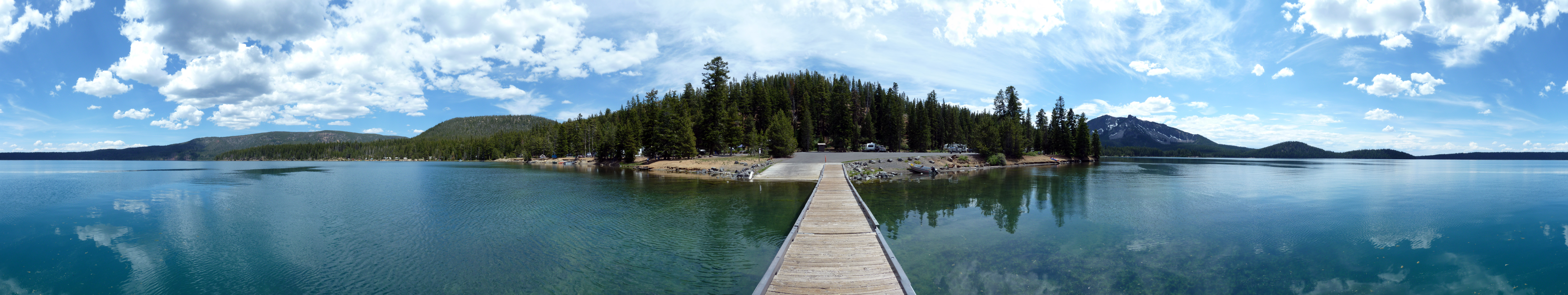
Paulina Lake from Little Crater Campground boat dock

== See also ==
- List of lakes in Oregon
