= The Cove Palisades State Park =

State park in Oregon, United States

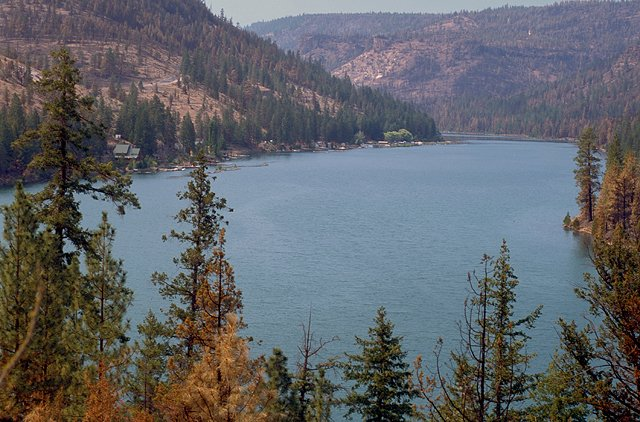
- Lake Billy Chinook

- Location within Oregon Location within the United States
- Type: Public, state
- Location: Jefferson County, Oregon
- Nearest city: Culver, Oregon
- Coordinates: 44°32′35″N 121°16′30″W
- Operator: Oregon Parks and Recreation Department

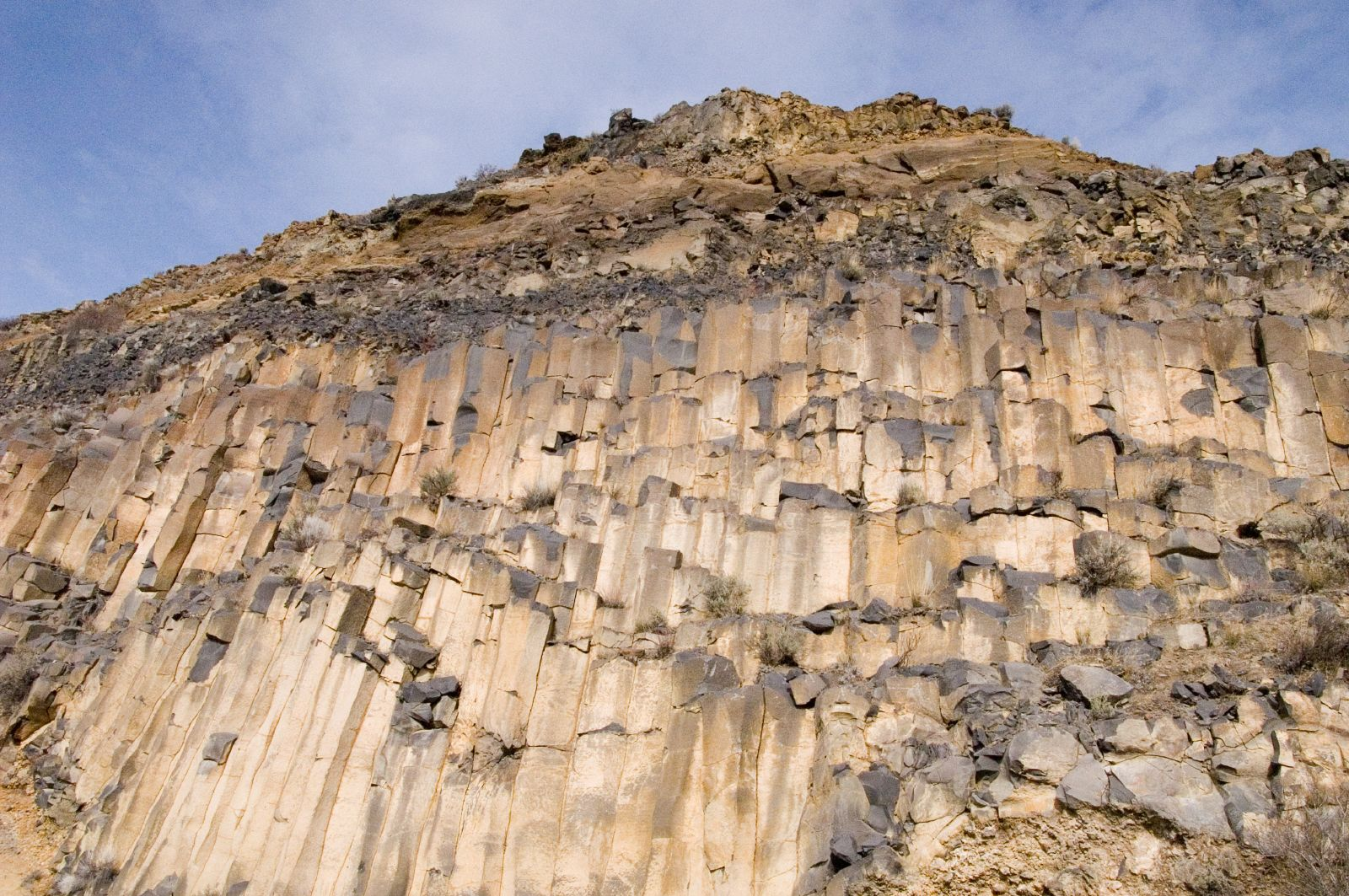
A rock face in Cove Palisades State Park

The Cove Palisades State Park is a state park in eastern Jefferson County, Oregon, near Culver and Madras in the central part of the state, and is administered by the Oregon Parks and Recreation Department. It is located on the waters and surrounding lands of Lake Billy Chinook, an impoundment of the Crooked, Deschutes, and Metolius rivers.

== Visitor opportunities ==
The park offers two full-service campgrounds, rental cabins, food and supplies for sale, marina access to Lake Billy Chinook with watercraft rentals, fishing, day use and picnic areas, and hiking trails. The park also offers historical interpretation, which includes the Crooked River Petroglyph in the park. There have also been some star parties that have been held at the state park.

== Lake Billy Chinook ==
Lake Billy Chinook lies in canyons carved by the three rivers into earth held in place by basaltic caprock. Construction of the Round Butte Dam was completed in 1964 across the Deschutes River. Operated by Portland General Electric (PGE), and jointly owned by PGE and the Confederated Tribes of Warm Springs, the dam and lake primarily provide electric generation for thousands of homes throughout the state. The Confederated Tribes named the lake in honor of Billy Chinook, a member of the Wasco tribe who acted as a guide in 1843 and 1844 for John C. Frémont and Kit Carson in the region of the lake. The lake extends beyond the boundaries of The Cove Palisades State Park.

Although fish passage facilities were installed at Round Butte Dam, anadromous fish, such as Chinook salmon, have failed to pass the dam. As a result, since the dam's completion migratory fish have been blocked from once-abundant spawning grounds on the upper Deschutes River and tributaries such as the Crooked River.

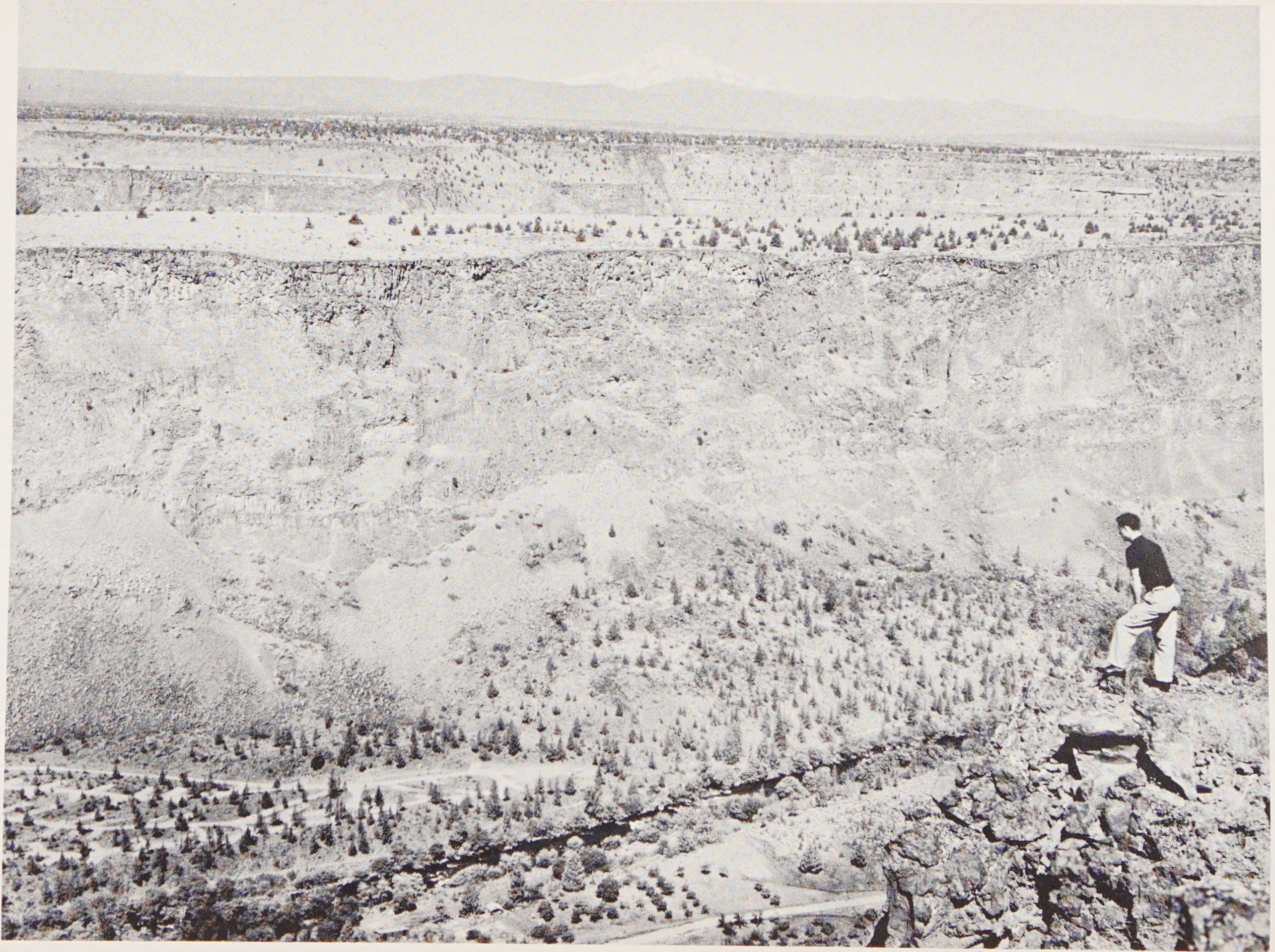
Cove Palisades as depicted in the 1956 article "Oregon State Park System" (Oregon Historical Quarterly)

== Research natural area ==
Embraced by the Crooked River and Deschutes River Arms of Lake Billy Chinook, the isolated, 200-acre (0.81 km^{2}) plateau called "The Island" (actually a peninsula, but with the appearance of an island due to its isolation by high, sheer cliffs) was designated a research natural area in 1986. The Island supports one of the last relatively pristine remnants of pre-settlement ecology in the western United States, and was closed to virtually all public access in 1997.

== See also ==
- Lake Billy Chinook Airport
- List of lakes in Oregon
- List of Oregon State Parks
