= Willow Creek (Deschutes River tributary) =

River in Oregon, United States

- Location of the mouth of Willow Creek in Oregon

Location
- Country: United States
- State: Oregon
- Counties: Crook, Jefferson

Physical characteristics
- Source: Ochoco Mountains
  - location: Ochoco National Forest, Crook County
  - coordinates: 44°30′28″N 120°48′29″W
  - elevation: 4,415 ft (1,346 m)
- Mouth: Deschutes River
  - location: Lake Simtustus, Jefferson County
  - coordinates: 44°40′18″N 121°13′41″W
  - elevation: 1,591 ft (485 m)
- Length: 26 mi (42 km)
- Basin size: 181 sq mi (470 km^{2})
- Discharge
  - minimum: 1 cu ft/s (0.028 m^{3}/s)

Willow Creek is a tributary, about 26 miles (42 km) long, of the Deschutes River in central Oregon in the United States. Arising near Foley Butte in the western Ochoco Mountains in Crook County, it flows generally northwest into Jefferson County and through the Crooked River National Grassland. The creek continues through the city of Madras and becomes the dividing line between two plateaus, Agency Plains and Little Agency Plains. It then enters the Deschutes above Pelton Dam and its impoundment, Lake Simtustus, about 105 miles (169 km) from the river's confluence with the Columbia River.

Named tributaries from source to mouth are Higgins, Coon, Newbill, and McMeen creeks followed by Dry Canyon. The creek and its tributaries support populations of redband trout, largescale sucker, bridgelip sucker, and longnose dace.

== See also ==
- List of Oregon rivers
