= Deschutes River Trail =

Trail system in Bend, Oregon, United States

Coordinates: 44.04504979558748°N 121.3163941759248°W

The Deschutes River Trail (DRT) is a network of multi-use paths along the Deschutes River in Oregon. The trail has two distinct sections: one in Deschutes County in central Oregon and one in Wasco County in north-central Oregon.

== Deschutes County segments ==
As of 2026, the various discontinuous Central Oregon segments of the Deschutes River Trail comprise 28.5 miles (45.9 km) of trail. Some sections are "natural" (i.e., ungraded and unpaved), while other segments are paved with soft or hard surfaces. They run from south of Benham Falls, near Sunriver, through downtown Bend to Tumalo State Park. Most segments lie along either the eastern or western bank of the river, while a few urban stretches of the river have trails on both sides.

From south to north:

=== South of Bend (Deschutes National Forest) ===
The Deschutes River Trail in the Deschutes National Forest is not always well marked. It runs for 14.5 miles (23.3 km), following the east bank of the Deschutes River between Sunriver and Benham Falls, where the trail crosses a footbridge. From Benham Falls north to Century Drive, just outside Bend, the trail follows the west bank of the river. These trails are used by hikers and bikers, and off-leash dogs are allowed.

=== In and around Bend ===
These trails, maintained by Bend Park & Recreation District (BPRD), are used by hikers and bikers (except where noted). Dogs must be on a leash.

==== South Canyon Reach ====
A rocky, natural-surface multi-use loop trail, much of it ungraded, runs for 2.5 miles (4.0 km) on both sides of the river through a steep canyon between Reed Market Road's Bill Healy Bridge and a footbridge about 1.25 miles (2.01 km) to the south. Bicycles are not allowed on the west side trail segment.

==== Old Mill Reach ====
A paved network of in-town trails and footbridges runs for 2.7 miles (4.3 km) in total, on both sides of the river, between the Bill Healy Bridge in the south and Miller's Landing Park/McKay Park in the north.

==== Pioneer Reach ====
A mostly paved network of in-town trails, boardwalks, and footbridges runs 1.7 miles (2.7 km) miles between Colorado Boulevard, (south of downtown Bend) and Pioneer Park (north of downtown). Most of the trail runs along the east side of the river, with a few southern sections along the west side as well. Between Miller's Landing Park and Drake Park, a gap in the trail requires users to take Riverfront Street for several blocks. Through Drake Park and Pacific Park, some sections completed in 2023 run along a boardwalk over the surface of Mirror Pond.

==== River Run and Awbrey Reaches ====
A narrow, stone-paved multi-use path runs 0.2 miles (0.32 km) through Pioneer Park and First Street Rapids Park immediately along the east bank of the river, past the Bend Spillway and First Street Rapids, to the First Street Footbridge.

Upon crossing the bridge, a wider, compacted gravel multi-use path runs 1.26 miles (2.03 km) along the west bank of the river, turns up a steep hill to Mt. Washington Boulevard to avoid the Rivers Edge Golf Course, runs down a steep hill alongside the boulevard, crosses the boulevard, and continues alongside the golf course to Sawyer Park, where another footbridge provides access from the parking lot on the east side of the river.

The path continues from Sawyer Park north for 3.9 miles along the west side of the river, atop a buried section of the Tumalo Irrigation District canal, high above the river canyon, until it comes to a dead end in the Awbrey Glen neighborhood. There is no access from this path to Riley Ranch on the east side of the canyon.

=== Riley Ranch to Tumalo State Park segment ===
A natural-surface trail runs north from Riley Ranch Nature Reserve for 1.4 miles (2.3 km) along the east bank of the river to Tumalo State Park. Bikes are not allowed on this segment. Dogs are allowed on the trail itself but not within Riley Ranch.

A natural-surface trail runs north from the Tumalo State Park campground for 1 mile (1.6 km) along the west bank of the river.

== Wasco County segments ==
Managed by Oregon State Parks, there is a trail running 11.3 miles (18.2 km) along the east bank of the river on a former railroad bed in Deschutes River State Park.
