= Lake Billy Chinook =

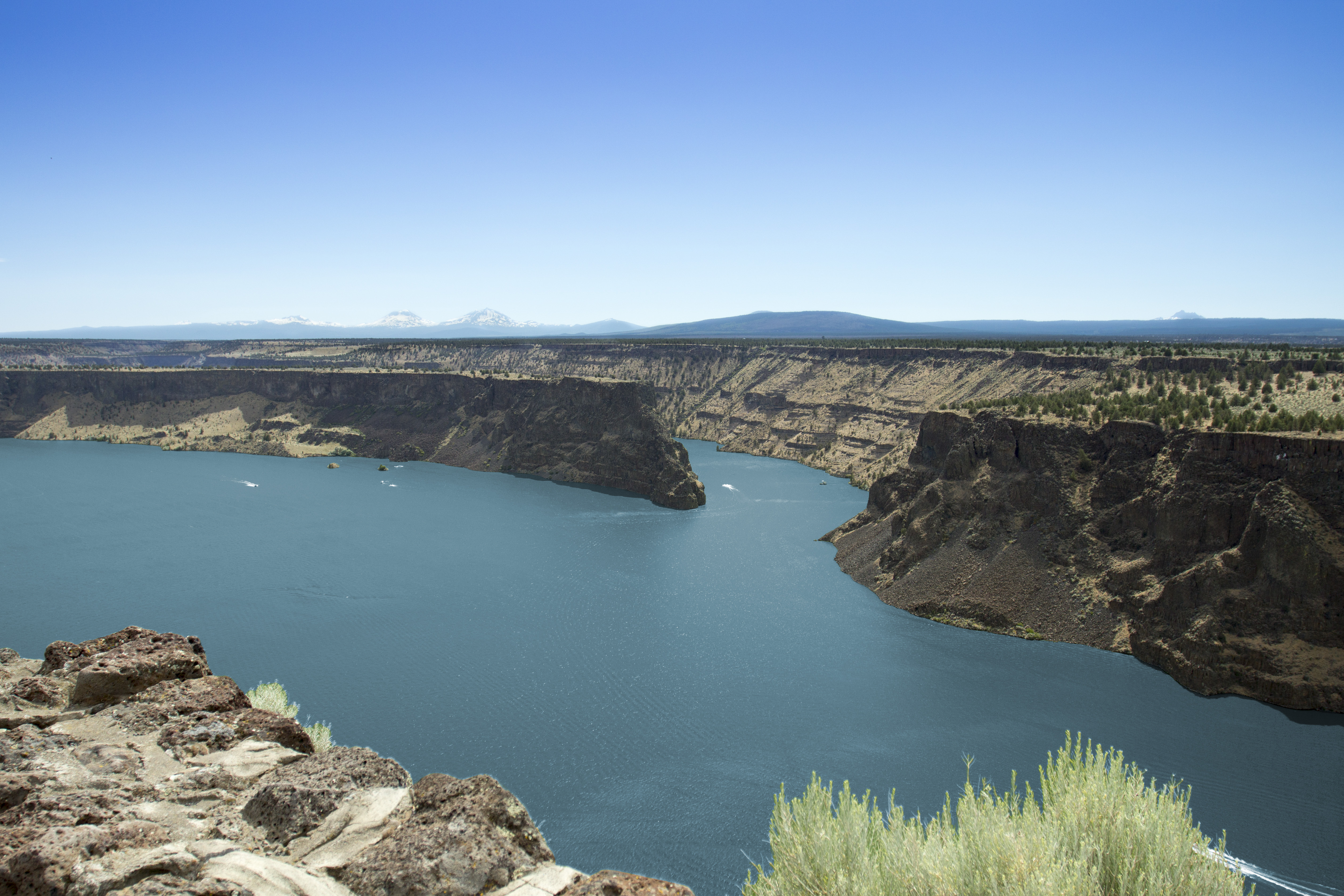
- Lake Billy Chinook

- Location within Oregon Location within the United States
- Location: Jefferson County, Oregon
- Coordinates: 44.58912°N 121.36496°W
- Type: Reservoir
- Primary inflows: Crooked, Deschutes, and Metolius rivers
- Primary outflows: Deschutes River
- Catchment area: 7,514 square miles (19,500 km^{2})
- Basin countries: United States
- First flooded: 1964
- Max. length: 28 mi (45 km)
- Surface area: 4,000 acres (1,600 ha)
- Average depth: 102 ft (31 m)
- Max. depth: 415 ft (126 m)
- Shore length^{1}: 72 mi (116 km)
- Surface elevation: 1,945 ft (593 m)
- Islands: Chinook Island
- Settlements: Culver
- ^{1} Shore length is not a well-defined measure.

Lake Billy Chinook is a reservoir in Jefferson County in the U.S. state of Oregon. Created by the Round Butte Dam in 1964, Lake Billy Chinook lies in a canyon at the confluence of the Crooked, Deschutes, and Metolius rivers near Culver and Madras. It was named for Billy Chinook, a Native American of the Wasco tribe who traveled alongside American explorers John C. Frémont and Kit Carson in their expeditions of 1843 and 1844.

== Geology ==
The canyon in which Lake Billy Chinook lies was carved by the three rivers that flow into the lake. The Deschutes Formation into which it is carved began forming about 11 million years ago, as alternating layers of basaltic lava, stream sediment, and volcanic debris flowed into the area from the Cascade Range. One to three million years ago, lava flows from the Cascades and Newberry Volcano capped the exposed material, forming the "rimrock basalt" which is visible atop the canyon. Further erosion by the three rivers, volcanic activity, and wind have continued to form and erode the canyon.

== Description ==
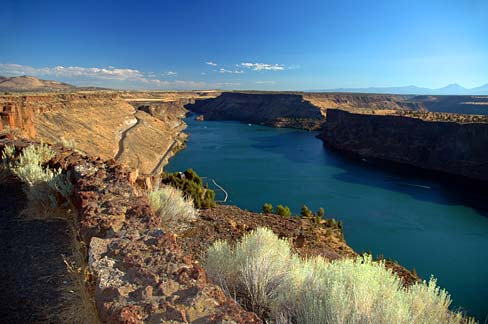
Rabbitbrush on the plateau above Lake Billy Chinook

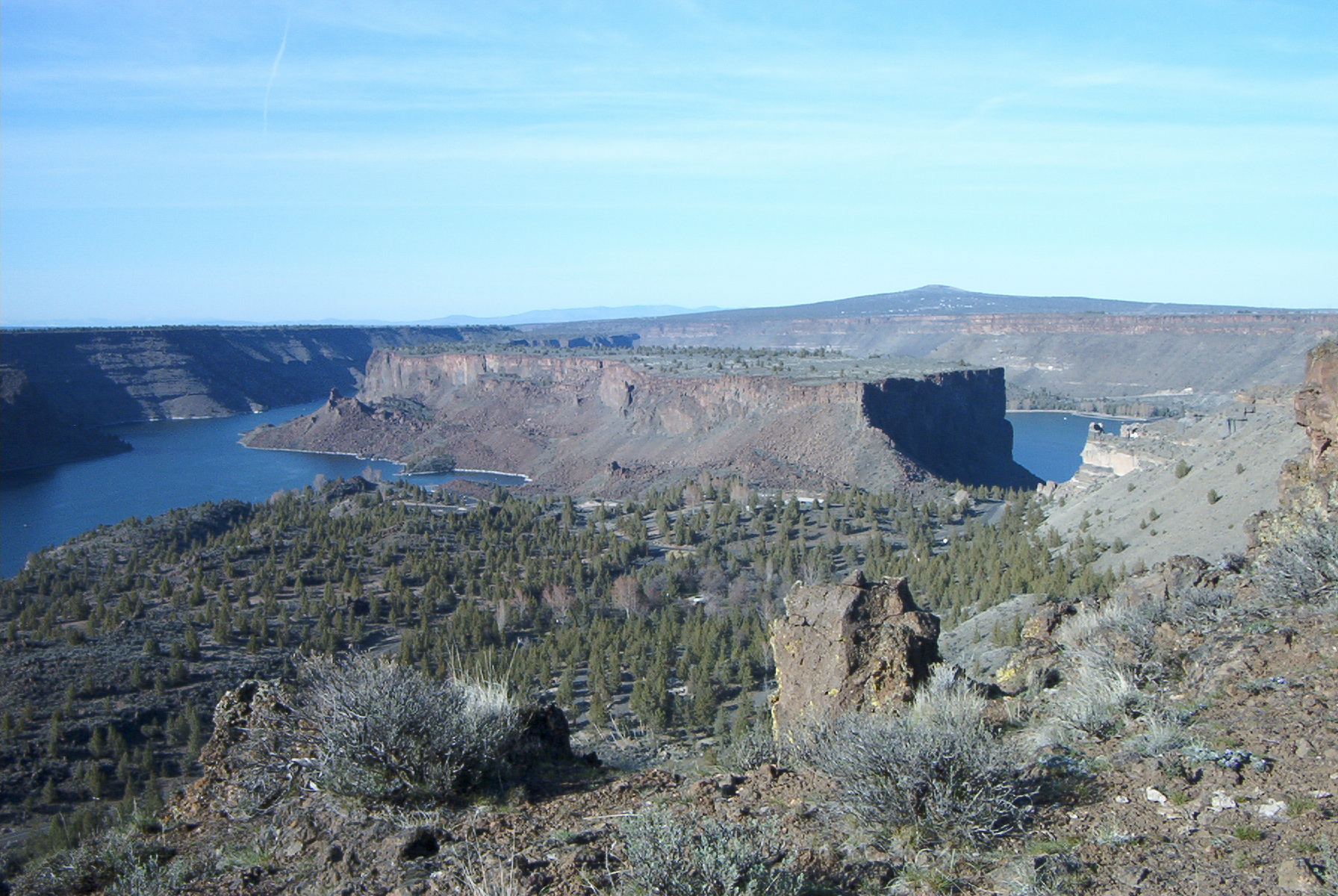
Looking north at the Island

The Deschutes and Crooked River branches of the lake are within the boundaries of The Cove Palisades State Park. The south shores of the Metolius River are public lands administered by the Bureau of Land Management and the United States Forest Service, while the north shores are part of the Warm Springs Indian Reservation. Along with the Island peninsula, there is one island in the lake named Chinook Island.

Lake Billy Chinook is a very popular recreational lake in Central Oregon for water skiing, sailing, jet skiing and boating. There are four boat launches around the lake, as well a marina and café on the east shore named the Cove Palisades Resort, which also offers rentals of houseboats and various other watercraft.

Southwest of the lake is Lake Billy Chinook Airport, a small, privately owned, public use airport.

=== Fishing ===
Lake Billy Chinook offers fishing for brown trout, smallmouth bass, rainbow trout, and Kokanee, a land-locked salmon. The lake is also one of the few bodies of water in the United States where bull trout, a threatened species that thrives in Lake Billy Chinook, can be legally fished. The state record bull trout, weighing 23 lbs., 2 ounces was harvested from Lake Billy Chinook in 1989, though a much larger specimen thought to potentially be a world record catch was caught and released by an angler in 2023.

As of 2014, the Metolius arm of the lake is closed to fishing, without a tribal permit.

=== Cove Palisades State Park ===
The majority of Lake Billy Chinook is surrounded by The Cove Palisades State Park. The state park offers both camping and lodging and is open all year for day use. The Cove Palisades consists of two campgrounds: Crooked River Campground (open all year) and the Deschutes Campground which is open from mid-May to mid-September. The Crooked River Campground is located higher up in the canyon where as the Deschutes Campground is walking distance from the water.

== The Island ==
Between the Deschutes and Crooked River branches of the lake, there is a large and isolated 208-acre (84 ha), 1.75-mile (2.82 km) peninsular plateau named the Island. The Island is surrounded on three sides by vertical cliffs at heights of 200 feet (61 m) to 700 feet (210 m) above the water. The Island was designated a Research Natural Area by the Bureau of Land Management (BLM) in 1986. In 1997, the BLM closed the Island to the public, although educational institutions and conservation groups are permitted to visit between May and mid-February.

Owing to the steep cliffs that surround it, the Island has never been grazed by livestock, except for one season of grazing by sheep in 1921. As a result, it contains one of the United States' last remaining undisturbed communities of two native vegetation types: western juniper-big sagebrush-bluebunch wheatgrass and western juniper-big sagebrush-bitterbrush. It also is an unusual home to the striped whiptail lizard, a species of southwestern U.S. deserts that settled the Island by escaping from a recreational vehicle.

The Island has not faced a sizable fire in the last century. The lack of a major fire has supported the strong presence of woody vegetation on the Island. The BLM plans to let any fire naturally burn as part of their research, contingent on weather conditions and personnel that can prevent it from affecting the Cove Palisades State Park facilities below the Island.

In 2011, U.S. Secretary of the Interior Ken Salazar designated the Island a National Natural Landmark. It is one of eleven National Natural Landmarks in Oregon.

== See also ==
- List of lakes in Oregon
