= White River Falls State Park =

State park in Oregon, United States

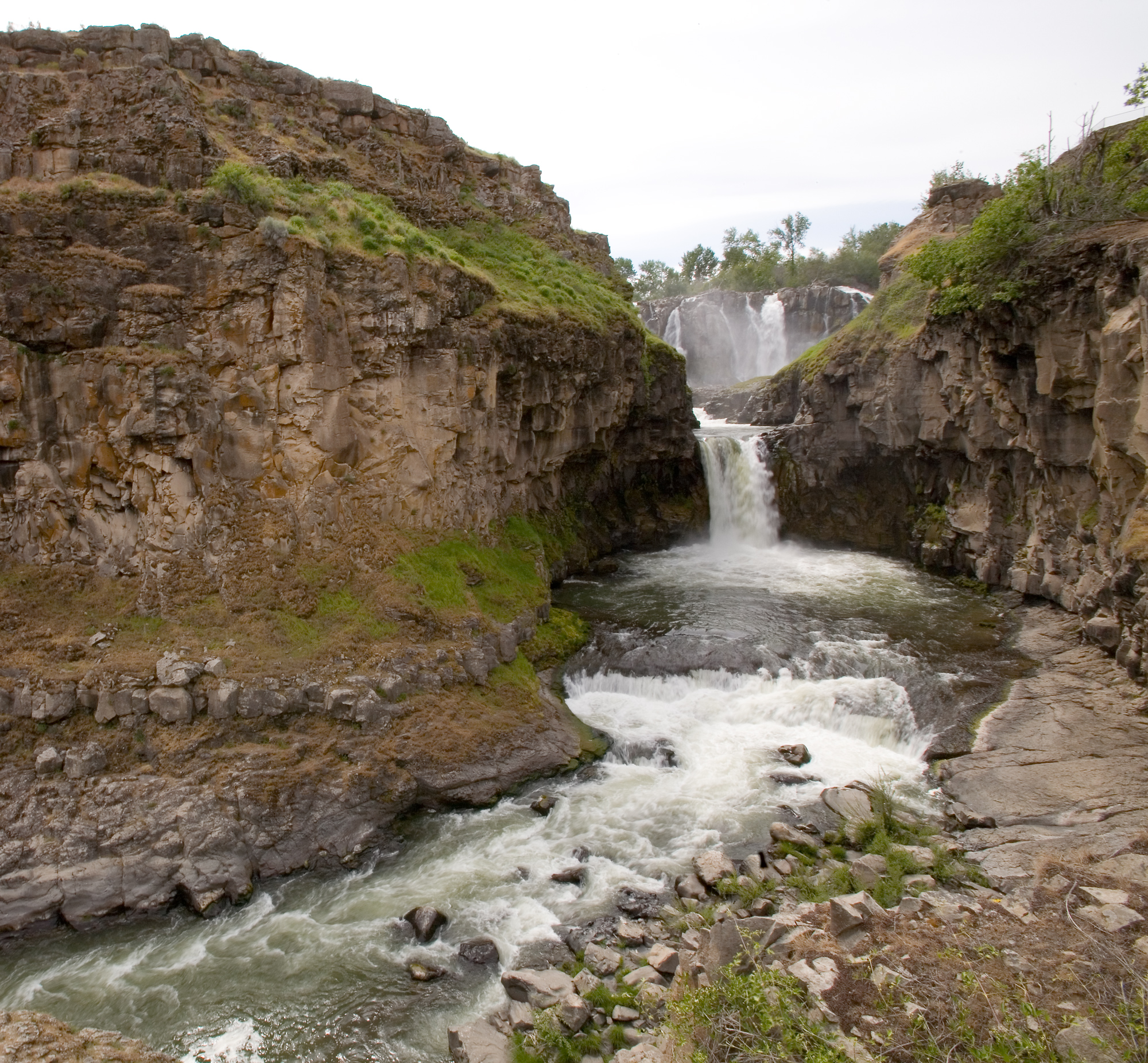
- White River Falls is the upper 90 foot falls and Celestial Falls is the lower 44 foot falls dropping into the pool

- Location within Oregon Location within the United States
- Type: Public, state
- Location: Wasco County, Oregon, U.S.
- Nearest city: Maupin, Oregon
- Coordinates: 45°14′29″N 121°05′44″W
- Operator: Oregon Parks and Recreation Department
- Open: mid-March through October

White River Falls State Park is a state park in north central Oregon. It is located 35 miles (56 km) by road south of The Dalles and 4.5 miles (7.2 km) east of Tygh Valley.

The focus of the park is the falls where wild and scenic White River plunges 90 feet (27 m) from a basalt shelf. At the base of the falls are the ruins of a hydropower plant which supplied electricity to north central Oregon from 1910 to 1960.

The falls are located at river mile (RM) 3 of the White River which flows into the Deschutes at RM 46.5.

There are no fees to use the park and it is open mid-March through the end of October.

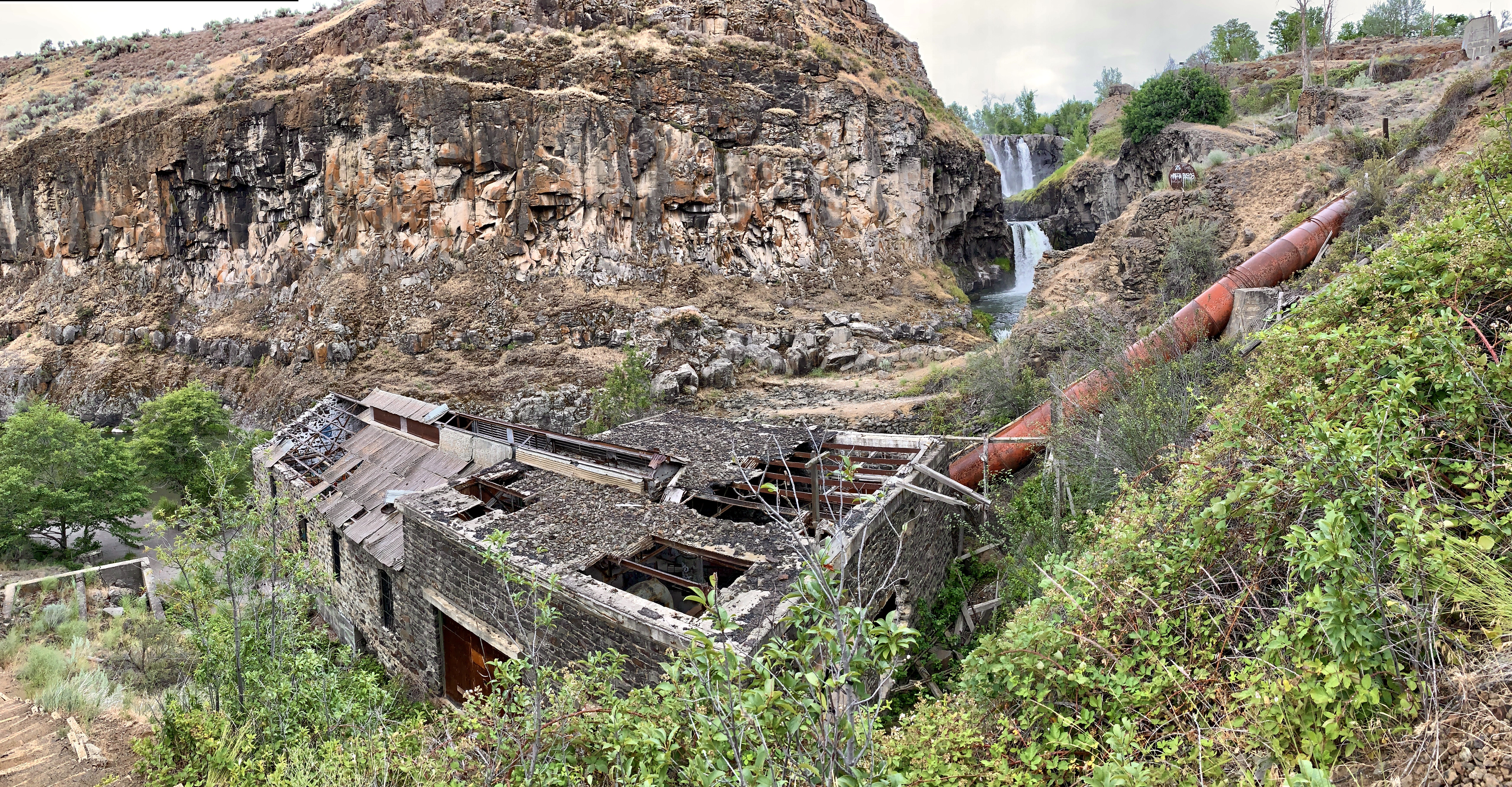
Panoramic photo of White River Falls State Park

== See also ==
- List of Oregon State Parks
