= Dillon Falls (Deschutes County, Oregon) =

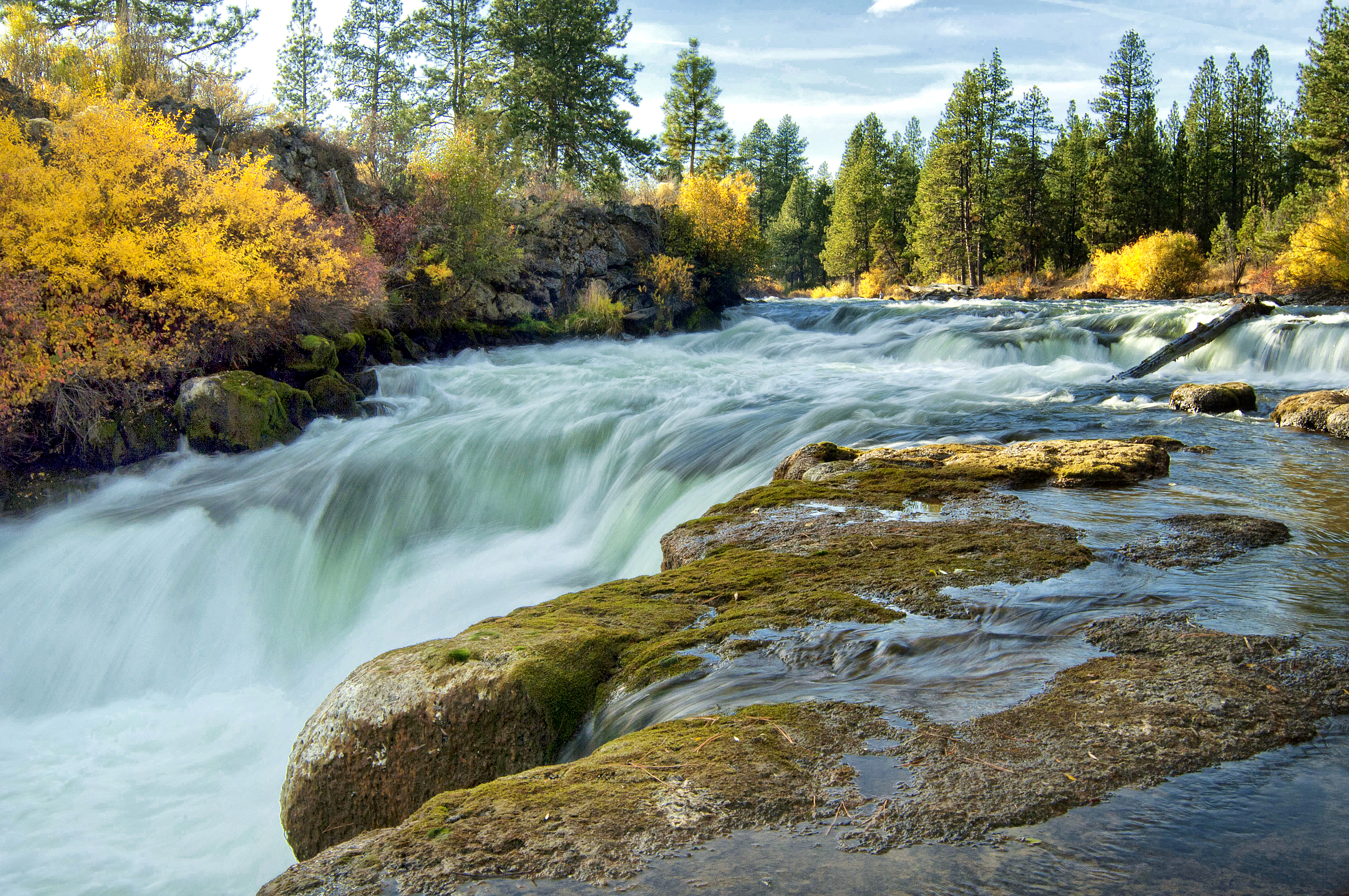
- Interactive map of Dillon Falls
- Location: Near Bend, Oregon
- Coordinates: 43°57′27″N 121°24′44″W
- Type: Cataract
- Elevation: 4,034 feet (1,230 m)
- Total height: 15 feet (4.6 m)
- Number of drops: 1
- Average width: 50 feet (15 m)
- Watercourse: Deschutes River

Dillon Falls are rapids on the Deschutes River in the U.S. state of Oregon near Bend in the Deschutes National Forest.

Unlike the nearby Benham Falls, Dillon Falls are not widely documented because they are hard to see. Trails provide a somewhat better view of the falls. The falls were named after Leander Dillon, a nearby homesteader. He died in 1907.

Dillon Falls starts off as a dramatic 15-foot (4.6 m) drop, then become a steep and violent Class-5 rapids with a hazardously positioned tree in the center before ending as class 2 and 3. Experienced rafters can run the falls before taking out at Lava Island Falls downstream.

== Incidents ==
On July 19, 2025, a group of people were swept off the falls while nearby. One person was found dead at the scene and the other two were declared missing. Another person was found on July 20, rescue operations were still underway as of July 22.

== See also ==
- List of waterfalls in Oregon
