= Fall River (Oregon) =

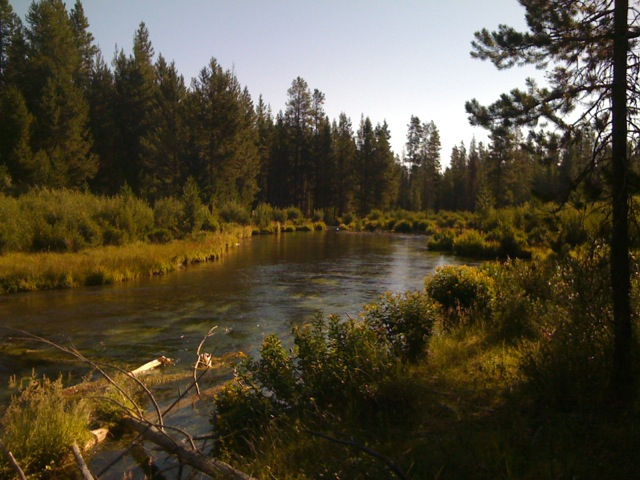
- The Fall River in summer

- Location of the mouth of the Fall River in Oregon

Location
- Country: United States
- State: Oregon
- County: Deschutes

Physical characteristics
- Source: Deschutes National Forest
  - location: a spring about 3.8 mi (6.1 km) southeast of Lookout Mountain
  - coordinates: 43°46′03″N 121°38′00″W
  - elevation: 4,274 ft (1,303 m)
- Mouth: Deschutes River (left bank)
  - location: just downstream from La Pine State Park
  - coordinates: 43°47′18″N 121°30′41″W
  - elevation: 4,175 ft (1,273 m)
- Length: 12 mi (19 km)

The Fall River is a tributary of the Deschutes River in the Deschutes National Forest in Deschutes County, Oregon, United States. The source is a spring approximately 2 miles (3 km) northwest of Pringle Falls. The river flows to the northeast and is about 12 miles (19 km) long. Fly fishing is permitted.

There is a trail along the river, and also a campground about one mile downstream from the head of the river; a guard station at the head of the river can be rented.

Fall River Falls is on the river within La Pine State Park.

The Fall River also hosts the Fall River Hatchery, a state-run fish hatchery which raises rainbow trout, brook trout and cutthroat trout fingerling for stocking programs throughout the state. The river has one named tributary, Indian Creek, which enters from the left above the hatchery.

== See also ==
- List of rivers of Oregon
