= Benham Falls =

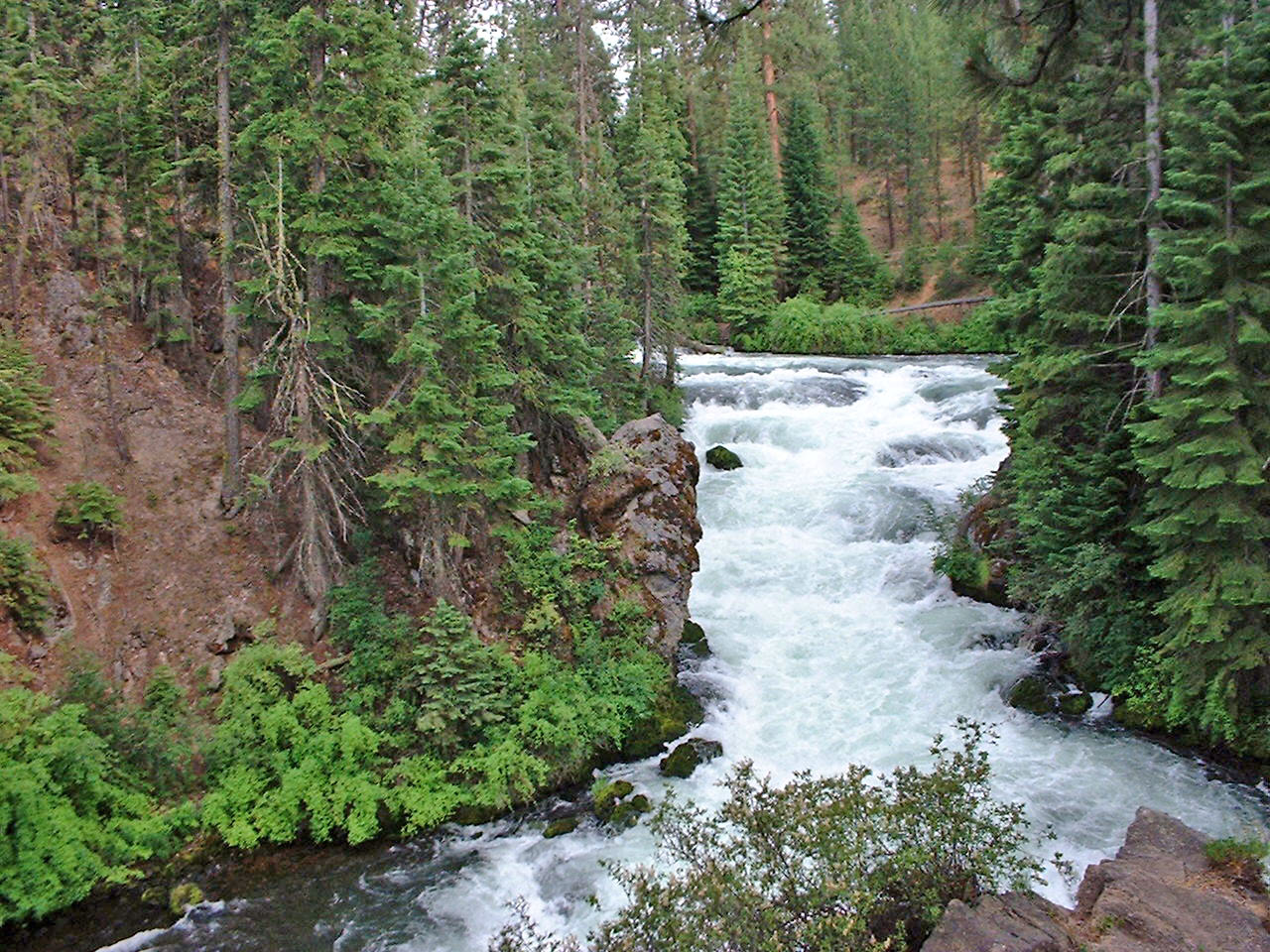
- Interactive map of Benham Falls
- Location: 3.5 miles north of Sunriver, Oregon
- Coordinates: 43°56′15″N 121°24′44″W
- Type: Cascade
- Elevation: 4,153 ft (1,266 m)
- Total height: 25 ft (7.6 m)
- Total width: 40 ft (12 m)

Benham Falls are rapids of the Deschutes River located between the resort community of Sunriver and the town of Bend, Oregon, United States. With a pitch of 22.5°, they are rated Class 5 for watercraft, and are the largest falls on the upper Deschutes.

The falls were created by the eruption of nearby Lava Butte approximately 6,000 years ago, as the lava flow dammed the Deschutes, forming a lake known as Lake Benham. The river eventually flowed over the dam, draining the lake and thus forming Benham Falls. Around 1885, J. R. Benham attempted and failed to file a land claim near the falls, though they were later named for him.

Today, there are forest roads connecting Benham Falls to Lava Butte, Lava River Cave, and Sunriver Resort. A footbridge connects the forest road to an easy-to-navigate trail near the river and falls. The shady area has much wildlife and flowers. Because of this, the area also has mosquitoes. The United States Forest Service has established a few lookouts over the gorge for viewers. Hikers and mountain bikers who continue on this trail pass Dillon Falls, Lava Island Falls, and eventually, the city of Bend. Benham Falls is relatively easier to see compared to the falls downstream, because it is not surrounded by lava flow from Lava Butte, but surrounded by forest. Because of its location, it is also much more popular.

Benham Falls is also in the Deschutes National Forest and the Newberry National Volcanic Monument. Benham Falls Recreation Site and Benham Falls West Recreation Site are located nearby.
