= Pelton Dam =

Dam on the Deschutes River in Jefferson County, Oregon, U.S.

Coordinates: 44°41′39″N 121°13′51″W

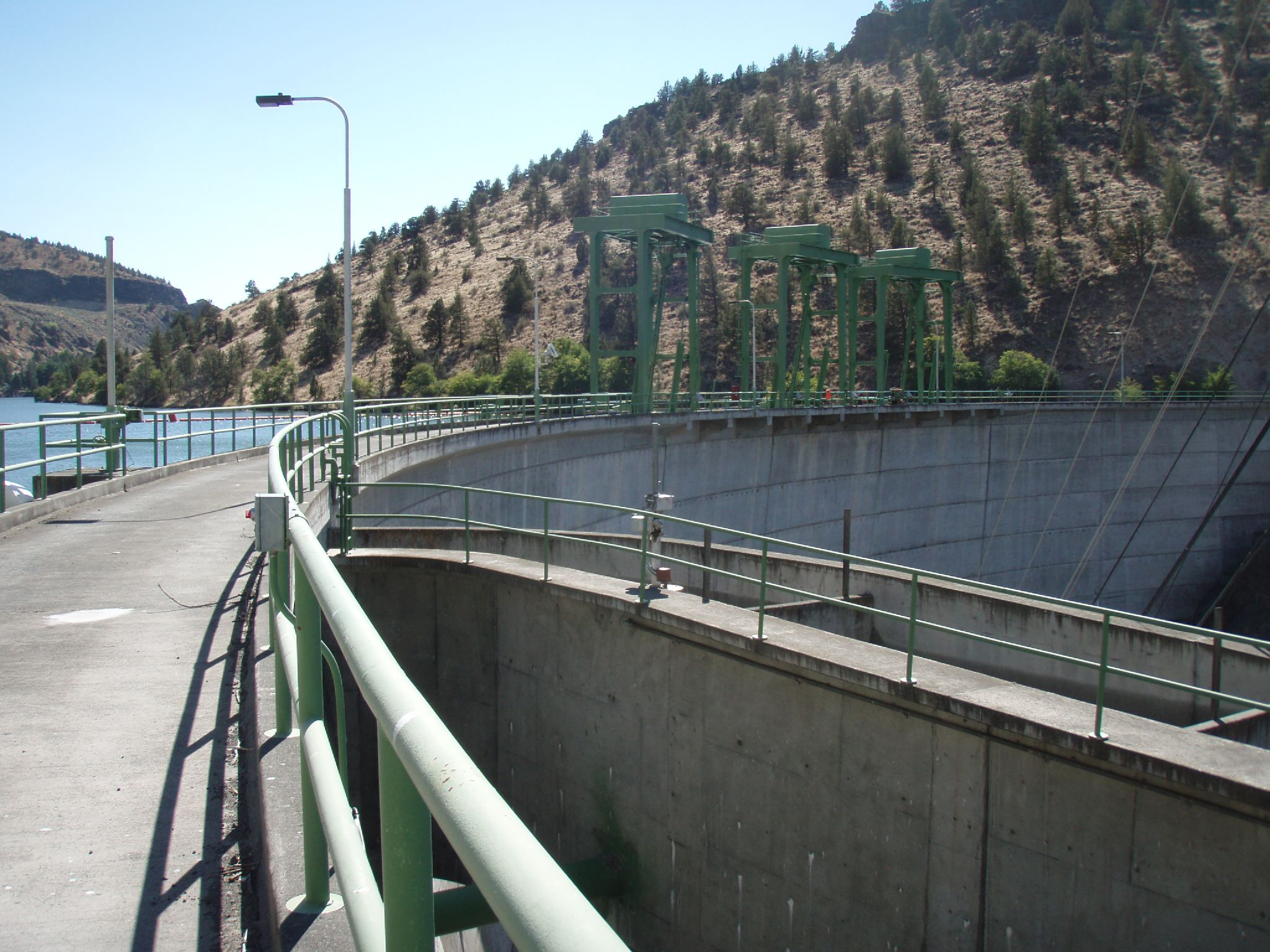
Pelton Dam

Pelton Dam is a major dam on the Deschutes River in Jefferson County, Oregon, owned and operated as a hydroelectric facility by Portland General Electric, one element of its Pelton Round Butte Project on the Deschutes.

The concrete arch dam at Pelton dates from 1958, has a height of 204 feet (62 m) from bedrock, a width of 965 feet (294 m) at its crest, and generates 110 megawatts of electricity.

Upstream, to the south, Pelton Dam impounds the waters of the Deschutes to create the deep Lake Simtustus in a relatively narrow canyon about 7 miles (11 km) back to the 1964 Round Butte Dam. The lake has a surface area of about 540 acres (220 ha) and holds 33,190 acre-feet (40,940,000 m^{3}) of water. The name "Simtustus" honors a native who scouted for the U.S. Army during the 1867–68 campaign against the Paiutes.

Downstream, 2.5 miles (4 km) north, a regulating dam controls the river flow. The area between is called the Pelton Regulating Reservoir. In 1982 the Confederated Tribes of Warm Springs installed a hydroelectric turbine unit in the regulating dam for additional power. Between 2000 and 2005 the CTWS also asserted itself as a stakeholder in the project's re-licensing negotiations between Portland General Electric and the Federal Energy Regulatory Commission, winning key environmental, cultural, and water rights concessions.

On June 29, 2021, Pelton Dam recorded a temperature of 119°F (48.3°C), making it the third time Oregon’s highest temperature was recorded. Prineville recorded a temperature of 119°F on July 28, 1898, and Pendleton recorded the same temperature shortly after on August 10 that same year.

== Climate ==
Climate data for Pelton Dam (extremes 1958-present)
Month	Jan	Feb	Mar	Apr	May	Jun	Jul	Aug	Sep	Oct	Nov	Dec	Year
Record high °F (°C)	71 (22)	78 (26)	86 (30)	95 (35)	108 (42)	119 (48)	114 (46)	117 (47)	108 (42)	103 (39)	79 (26)	71 (22)	119 (48)
Mean daily maximum °F (°C)	57.2 (14.0)	61.0 (16.1)	65.7 (18.7)	71.8 (22.1)	82.0 (27.8)	91.9 (33.3)	99.9 (37.7)	98.1 (36.7)	92.3 (33.5)	79.4 (26.3)	64.4 (18.0)	56.0 (13.3)	76.6 (24.8)
Daily mean °F (°C)	47.5 (8.6)	50.5 (10.3)	54.4 (12.4)	59.4 (15.2)	68.2 (20.1)	77.1 (25.1)	83.4 (28.6)	81.0 (27.2)	75.3 (24.1)	64.8 (18.2)	52.9 (11.6)	46.6 (8.1)	63.4 (17.4)
Mean daily minimum °F (°C)	37.7 (3.2)	40.1 (4.5)	43.2 (6.2)	47.0 (8.3)	54.3 (12.4)	62.4 (16.9)	67.0 (19.4)	63.9 (17.7)	58.2 (14.6)	50.2 (10.1)	41.5 (5.3)	37.2 (2.9)	50.2 (10.1)
Mean minimum °F (°C)	27.0 (−2.8)	28.8 (−1.8)	32.0 (0.0)	34.5 (1.4)	42.6 (5.9)	51.3 (10.7)	58.0 (14.4)	56.1 (13.4)	48.9 (9.4)	39.1 (3.9)	29.7 (−1.3)	25.7 (−3.5)	23.5 (−4.7)
Record low °F (°C)	−10 (−23)	−11 (−24)	9 (−13)	17 (−8)	24 (−4)	29 (−2)	35 (2)	36 (2)	25 (−4)	9 (−13)	0 (−18)	−15 (−26)	−15 (−26)
Average precipitation inches (mm)	6.04 (153)	5.48 (139)	4.62 (117)	2.41 (61)	1.81 (46)	0.75 (19)	0.07 (1.8)	0.13 (3.3)	0.45 (11)	1.92 (49)	3.53 (90)	6.31 (160)	33.52 (851)
Average snowfall inches (cm)	1.1 (2.8)	0.8 (2.0)	0.0 (0.0)	0.0 (0.0)	0.0 (0.0)	0.0 (0.0)	0.0 (0.0)	0.0 (0.0)	0.0 (0.0)	0.0 (0.0)	0.0 (0.0)	0.7 (1.8)	2.6 (6.6)
Average precipitation days (≥ 0.01 in)	12.2	10.9	11.7	8.1	6.1	2.9	0.5	0.6	1.4	4.7	8.8	12.6	80.6
Average snowy days (≥ 0.1 in)	0.4	0.3	0.0	0.0	0.0	0.0	0.0	0.0	0.0	0.0	0.0	0.1	0.8
Source 1: NOAA
Source 2: WRCC
