= White River (Oregon) =

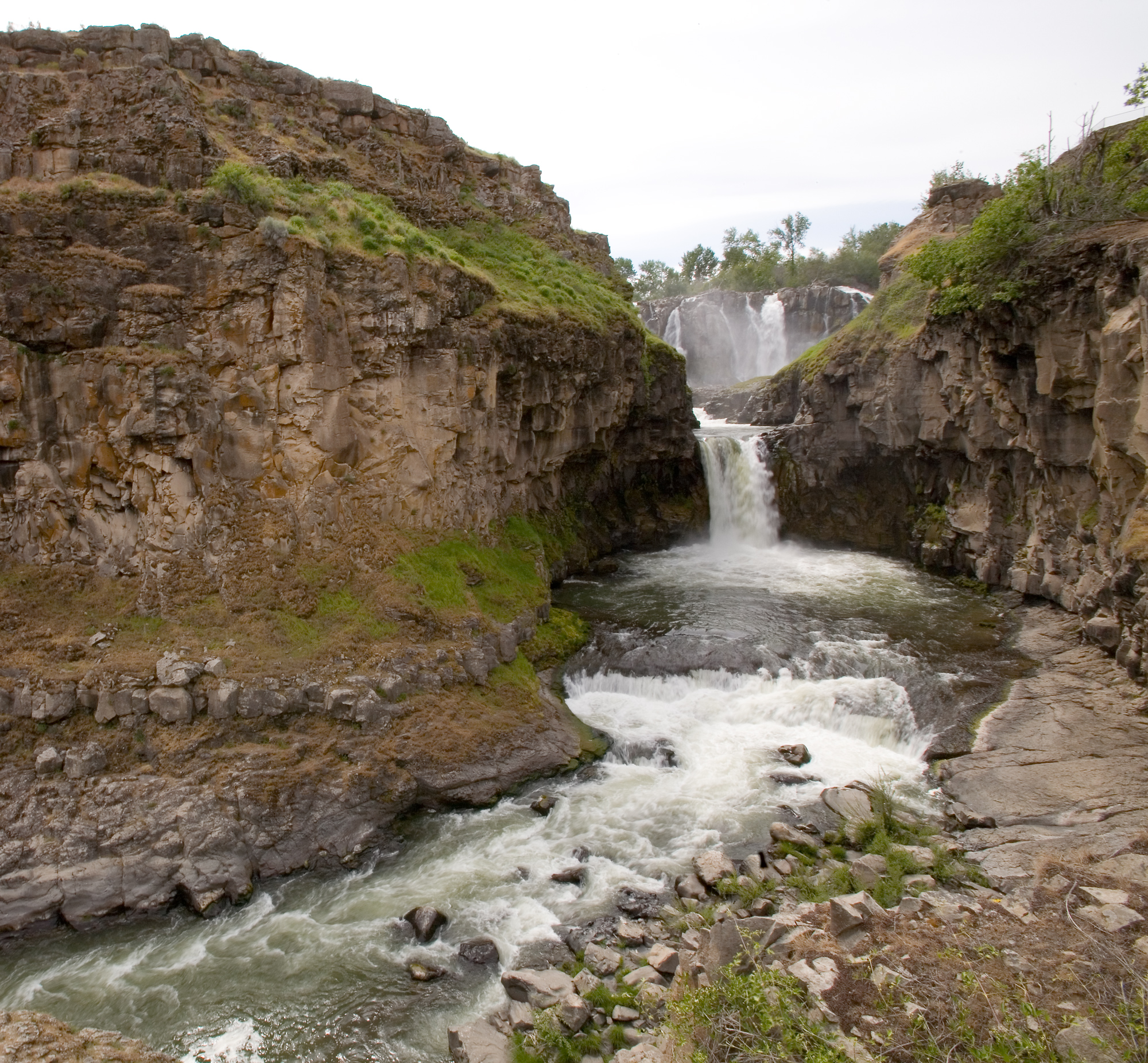
- White River Falls

- Location of the mouth of the White River in Oregon
- Etymology: The color of the river when it carries glacial sediments

Location
- Country: United States
- State: Oregon
- County: Hood River and Wasco

Physical characteristics
- Source: Mount Hood
  - location: Mount Hood Wilderness, Cascade Range
  - coordinates: 45°20′47″N 121°41′40″W
  - elevation: 6,722 ft (2,049 m)
- Mouth: Deschutes River
  - location: near Maupin
  - coordinates: 45°14′01″N 121°04′03″W
  - elevation: 761 ft (232 m)
- Length: 50 mi (80 km)
- Basin size: 409 sq mi (1,060 km^{2})
- Discharge
  - average: 423 cu ft/s (12.0 m^{3}/s)

National Wild and Scenic River
- Type: Scenic, Recreational
- Designated: October 28, 1988

The White River is a tributary of the Deschutes River, approximately 50 miles (80 km) long, in north-central Oregon in the United States. It drains a scenic mountainous area of the Columbia Plateau on the east side of the Cascade Range southeast of Mount Hood. In the 1840s, a section of the Oregon Trail called the Barlow Road passed through the river corridor. This section of the road is listed on the National Register of Historic Places.

== Geography ==
The White River originates in the high Cascades in eastern Hood River County, in the Mount Hood National Forest on the southeast flank of Mount Hood. The headwaters are just below White River Glacier in White River Canyon, the steep canyon between Timberline Lodge and Mount Hood Meadows ski areas. It flows southeast, under Oregon Route 35, another 12 miles (19 km) southeast then east for 8 miles (13 km) before turning east-northeast past Tygh Valley. It enters the Deschutes River from the west approximately 20 miles (32 km) southeast of The Dalles.

In its lower course near Tygh Valley in Wasco County, the river plunges over a 90-foot (27 m) basalt shelf in White River Falls State Park. The falls were used for hydroelectricity in the surrounding counties from 1910 until the completion of The Dalles Dam on the Columbia River in 1960.

== Wild and Scenic ==
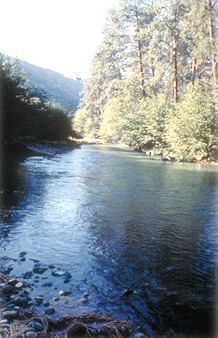
A Wild and Scenic stretch of the White River

In 1988, 46.8 miles (75.3 km) of the river were designated Wild and Scenic by the United States Congress. Of this, 24.3 miles (39.1 km) of the river are designated "scenic" and 22.5 miles (36.2 km) are designated "recreational." In its resource assessment, the White River plan identified geology, hydrology, botany, habitat, historic resources, recreation, and scenery as being outstandingly remarkable values (ORVs). To qualify as an ORV, each value must be a unique, rare, or exemplary feature that is significant at a regional or national level. The unique geological features include examples of recent volcanic activity, ghost forests, an active fumarole field, and glacial activity.

The river has unique hydrological features, such as its color in late summer and early fall and its isolation from other rivers. During the late summer and early fall, glacial outflow from Mount Hood turns the river milky white due to suspended sediment concentrations. It is hydrologically isolated from other river systems, which provides an environment where unique species can evolve.

Because of the diverse environments that the White River flows through, as well as its isolation from other rivers, there are a wide variety of life zones within its corridor. Many sensitive and unique plant species are found only in this area, including a genetically unique population of Columbia River redband trout.

== Recreation ==
The White River offers opportunities for a wide variety of recreational activities, including whitewater kayaking, Nordic skiing, photography, camping, fishing, hiking, and wildlife watching. The lower river is rated class III (intermediate), the upper river is III - IV (intermediate to advanced), and Celestial Gorge at flood is rated VI (extreme/exploratory).

Many fly fishermen who fish the lower Deschutes River watch the White River. On hot early summer days the glacial meltoff can cause the Deschutes to become unfishable.

== See also ==
- List of rivers of Oregon
- List of National Wild and Scenic Rivers
