= Agency Plains =

Plateau north of Madras, Oregon, United States

Agency Plains is a plateau just north of the city of Madras, Oregon, United States. It extends approximately 10 miles (16 km) north to south and 5 miles (8.0 km) east to west some 250 feet (76 m) in elevation above the east side of the Deschutes River. The area is composed of arable land and was the homestead area of the Gard, Campbell, and Ramsey families. A variety of seed crops are raised on the farmland, and before irrigation came to the area it was covered in dryland wheat. The area is roughly bisected by U.S. Route 26.

To the south is another GNIS-recognized area known as Little Agency Plains at 44.6270648°N 121.1683771°W which is separated from Agency Plains by Willow Creek.
