= Pringle Falls =

- Interactive map of Pringle Falls
- Location: Deschutes County, Oregon, United States
- Coordinates: 43°44′35″N 121°36′30″W
- Type: Rapids
- Elevation: 4,232 feet (1,290 m)
- Total height: 25 feet (7.6 m)
- Number of drops: multiple
- Watercourse: Deschutes River

Pringle Falls is a series of rapids or drops on the upper Deschutes River in the U.S. state of Oregon. From just downstream of Wyeth Campground, the rapids begin with about 600 feet (180 m) of whitewater rated class II (novice) on the International Scale of River Difficulty. The next 300 feet (91 m) is class III (intermediate] ending in a class IV (advanced) drop. Soggy Sneakers: A Paddler's Guide to Oregon's Rivers says, "Only expert kayakers should consider this drop, and only after scouting. It is definitely not a rapids for open canoes."

The Northwest Waterfall Survey describes the rapids as "the first major waterfall along the Deschutes River" but qualifies this by adding that the waterfall has been reported to be a cascade series with a total vertical drop of 25 feet (7.6 m) spread over a horizontal distance of 850 feet (260 m). The survey notes that the falls cannot be seen from nearby roadways or other public property.

Most boaters portage 1.5 miles (2.4 km) around the falls, taking out of the river at Wyeth Campground and putting back in below the falls at Pringle Falls Campground. Shorter portages are not feasible because the land on both sides of the rapids is private. The two campgrounds, one upstream and one downstream of the private land, are within the Deschutes National Forest.

== Name ==
The falls were named for O. M. Pringle, who bought 160 acres (65 ha) of government land here in 1902 under provisions of the Timber and Stone Act. The falls were also known as the Fish Trap, a reference to its use by Native Americans, who caught fish by the gills as they swam upriver through shallow channels. A post office named Pringlefalls operated from 1916 to 1918.
