= Deschutes River State Recreation Area =

Park in Oregon, United States

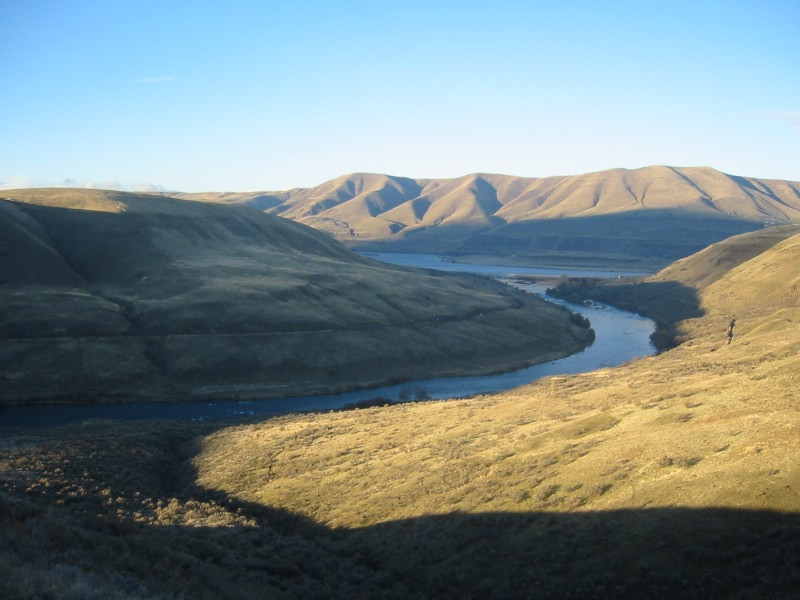
- Confluence of the Deschutes and the Columbia, as viewed from near the hiking trail on December 25, 2003

- Location within Oregon Location within the United States
- Type: Public, state
- Location: Sherman County, Oregon
- Nearest city: The Dalles
- Coordinates: 45°38′01″N 120°54′35″W
- Area: 35.1 acres (14.2 ha)
- Operator: Oregon Parks and Recreation Department
- Status: Open

The Deschutes River State Recreation Area is a park at the confluence of the Deschutes and Columbia rivers in the U.S. state of Oregon. It is a few miles east of The Dalles. The 35.1-acre (14.2 ha) park offers opportunities for camping, fishing, hiking, mountain biking, and equestrian trail riding.

== History ==
The chamber of commerce in The Dalles pushed for a state park at the location beginning in 1955. After years of studies, the state acquired the first tract of land in 1963, when it purchased 30 acres (12 ha) from the Columbia-Deschutes Power Company. In 1963, an additional 5.1 acres (2.1 ha) were purchased from the Miller family and added to the park.

== Details ==
Deschutes River is one of 28 state parks in Oregon with year-round campgrounds although water is turned off during the winter. There are 34 campsites suitable for recreational vehicles, with electricity and water available. An additional 25 primitive sites with drinking water and facilities nearby are available. The park is along the Oregon Trail and offers a covered wagon to rent for camping. The park includes showers, mowed lawns, and wildlife viewing. Hiking and biking opportunities include a trail named for former governor Victor G. Atiyeh that runs along the Deschutes. Hunting is also available for pheasant, chukar, and Hungarian partridge during designated seasons for each. Located on the west shore of the Deschutes River, Heritage Landing boat ramp is on the opposite shore from the main access to the park, with the Lower Deschutes Wildlife Area about one mile (1.6 km) upriver.
