= Lava River Cave =

Cave near Bend, Oregon

Coordinates: 43.895396°N 121.368917°W

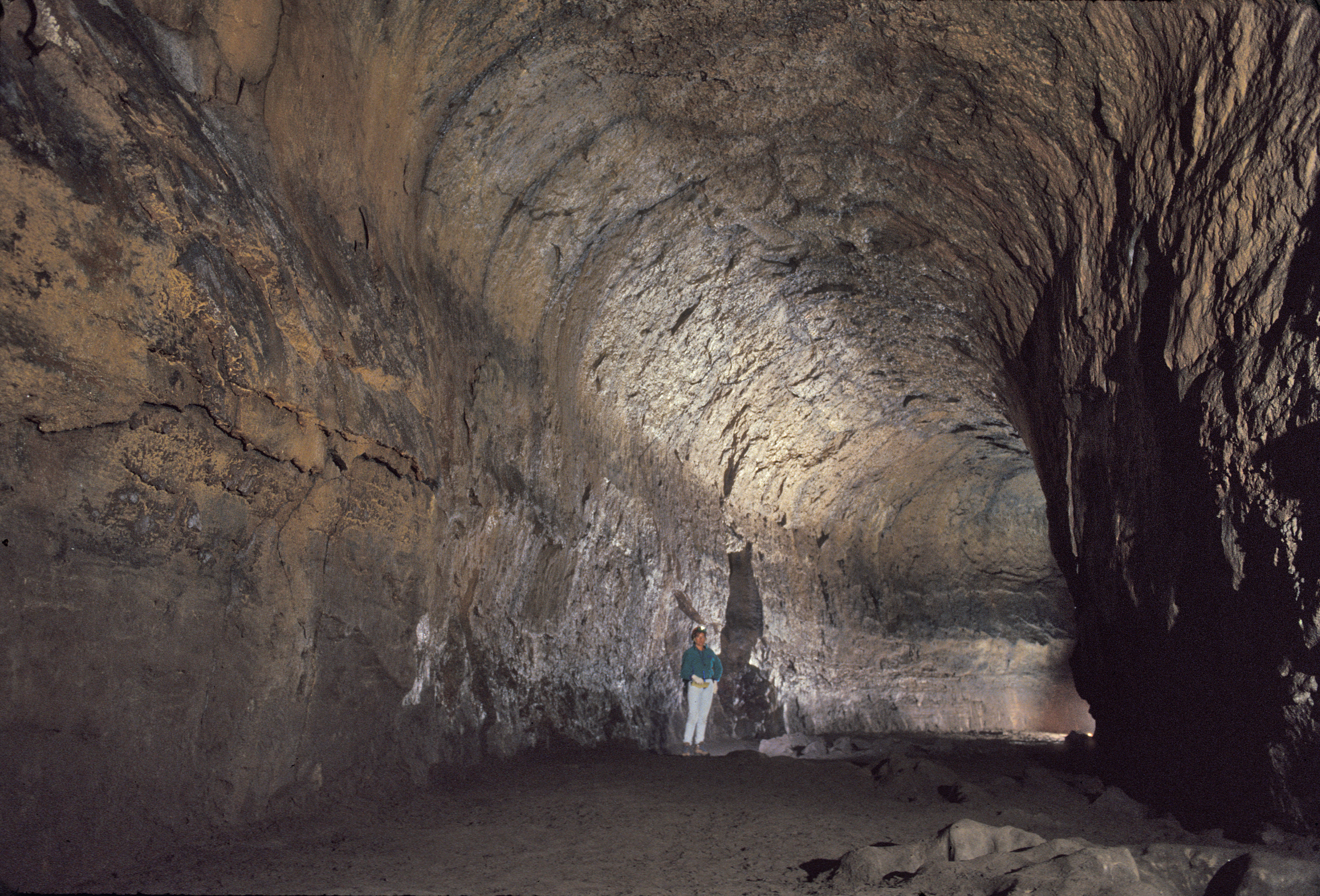
- High arched ceiling in Lava River Cave
- Interactive map of Lava River Cave
- Location: Deschutes County, Oregon, United States
- Length: 5,211 feet (1,588 m)
- Geology: Basalt of Bend
- Entrances: 2
- Access: Public

The Lava River Cave near Bend, Oregon, is part of the Newberry National Volcanic Monument, which is managed by the United States Forest Service. At 5,211 feet (1,588 m) in length, the northwest section of the cave is the longest continuous lava tube in Oregon. While the cave's discovery in 1889 was officially credited to a pioneer hunter, the presence of obsidian flakes near the cave has led archaeologists to conclude that Native Americans knew about the cave long before settlers arrived in central Oregon.

== Geology ==
The eruption which formed the Lava River Cave occurred about 80,000 years ago. The source is believed to be near Mokst Butte southeast of the entrance. The same volcanic flow that formed the cave underlies much of the Bend area and almost reaches Redmond, Oregon. However, the specific vent that created the cave has been buried by several younger flows.

The Lava River Cave was created by lava flowing downhill from a volcanic vent. The lava flowed northwest from the vent toward the Deschutes River. The flow began as a river of lava flowing in an open channel. Eventually, a lava crust solidified over the top of the flowing lava. This formed a roof over the river, enclosing it in a lava tunnel or tube. When the eruption from the vent stopped, the lava drained out of the tube leaving a lava tube cave behind. After the cave cooled, a section of its roof collapsed. This collapsed section provided the entrance to both the uphill (southeast) and downhill (northwest) cave sections.

The area around the Lava River Cave receives about 18 inches (46 cm) of precipitation per year. Over the centuries, water from rainfall and snow melt has seeped down through the soil and cracks in the cave roof depositing sand on the cave floor. Small rivulets of water carry the sand downhill, plugging the far end of the cave with sediment. As a result, it is unknown how far the cave actually extends beyond the sand plug.

== Environment ==
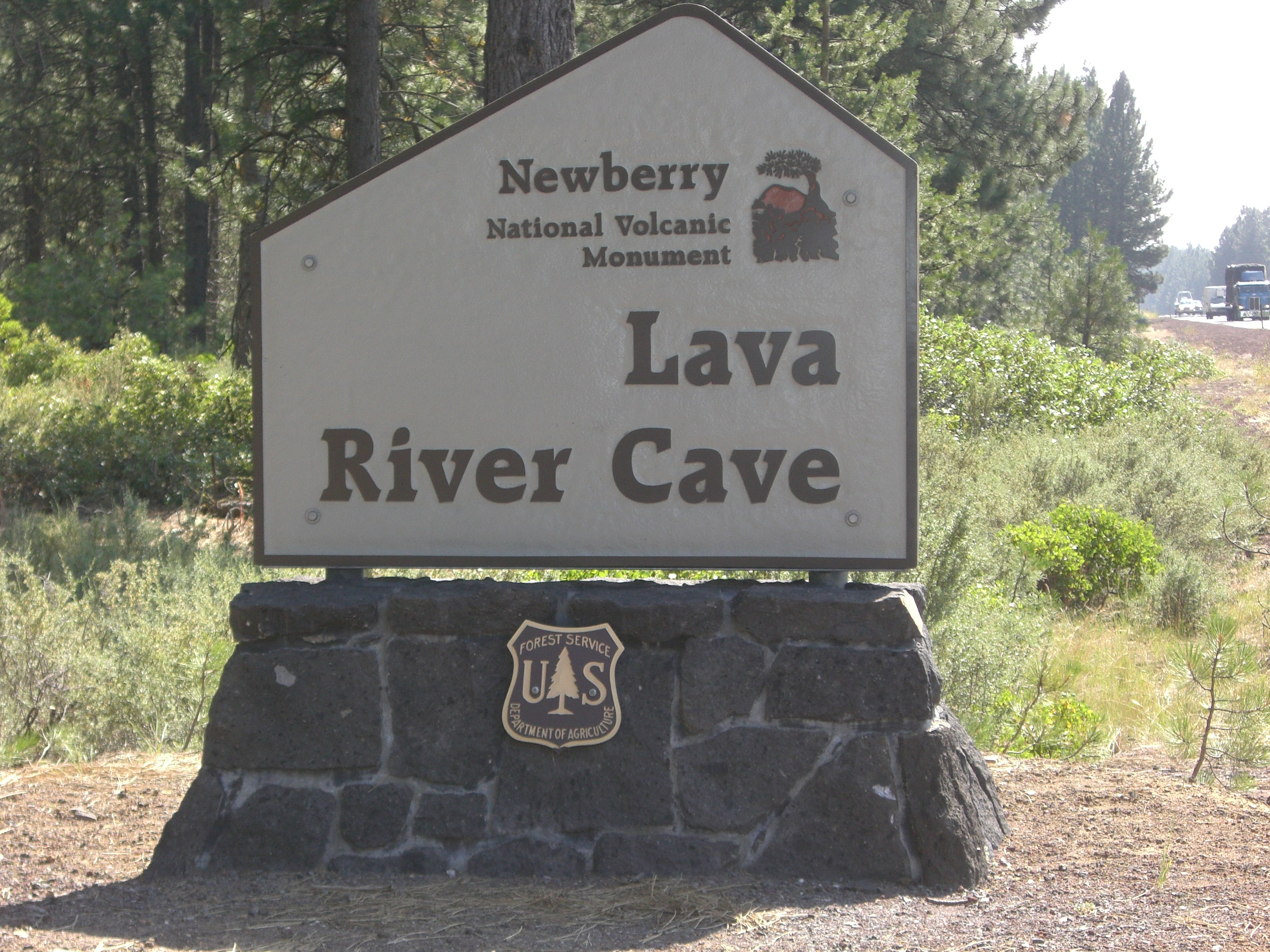
The cave is south of Bend just off Highway 97

The Lava River Cave is located 12 miles (19 km) south of Bend on the east side of Highway 97. It is part of the Newberry National Volcanic Monument, which is managed by the Forest Service as part of the Deschutes National Forest.

The forest surrounding the cave entrance is dominated by large ponderosa pine trees with sagebrush, manzanita, bitterbrush, snowbrush, and chokecherries as the main ground cover. Along the short path leading from the forest floor down to the cave entrance, visitors will also find serviceberry, false Solomon seal, squaw currant, Oregon grape, and small willow trees.

Animals common in the forest around the cave include golden-mantled ground squirrels, chipmunks, western gray squirrels, porcupines, weasels, pine martens, and mule deer. In 1991, park personnel observed a full-grown cougar run out of the cave entrance area, but that was a single sighting. There is also a wide range of resident and migratory bird species common to the area. Small resident birds include wrens, robins, juncos, thrushes, woodpeckers, sapsuckers, red-shafted flickers, and ruby-crowned kinglets. Larger birds include great horned owls, red-tailed hawks, vultures, and a few golden eagles.

Forest Service biologists have identified several species of harvestmen, worms, centipedes, and millipedes that live inside the cave. The harvestmen within the cave are Taracus marchingtoni, a newly described species endemic to the region.

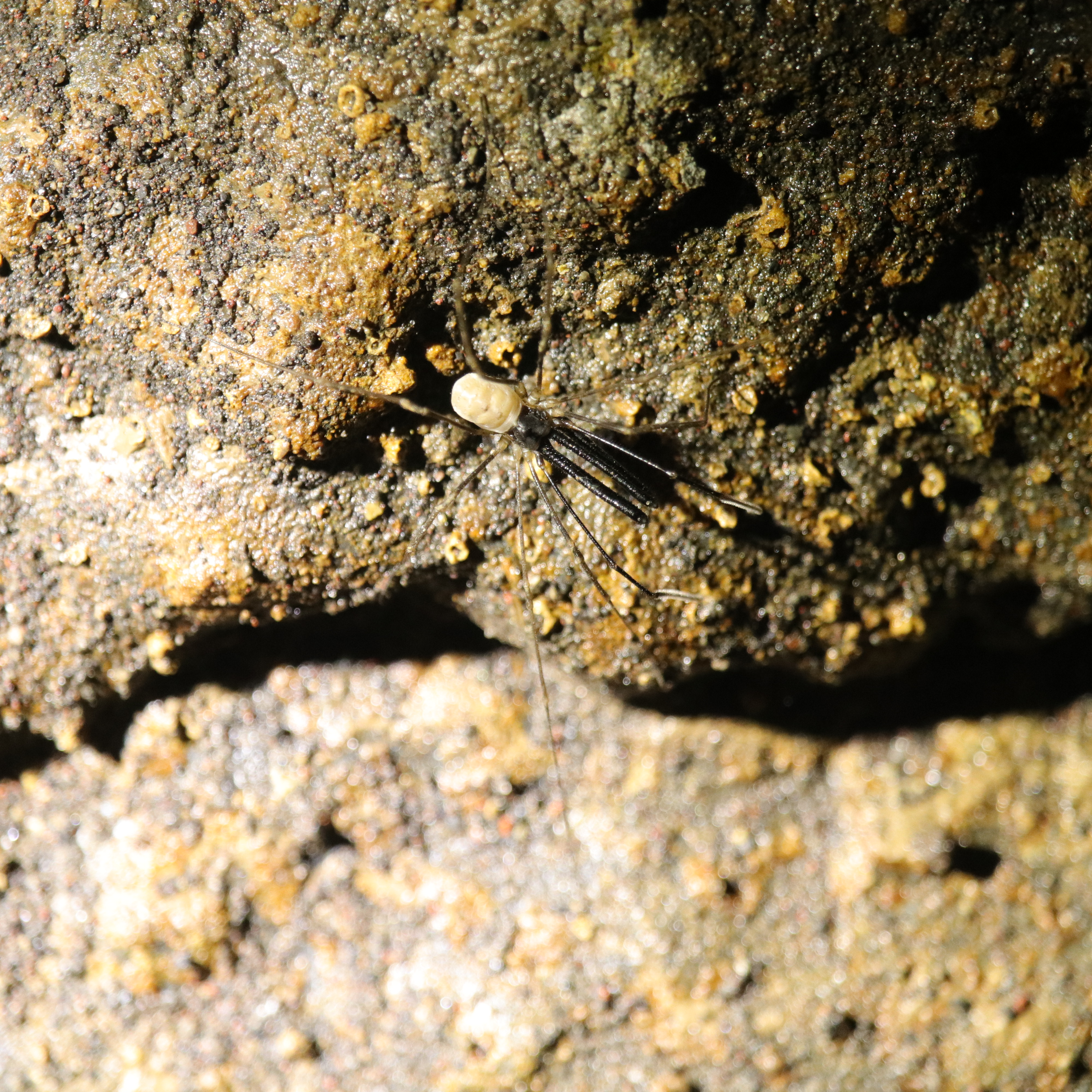
T. marchingtoni can be seen on the cave floor or walls.

There are also mice and bats that live in the cave year around. The cave's bat population is relatively small and the bats are very shy so visitors rarely see them. In fact, bats usually remain in hibernation until July, and when active they are nocturnal so they are asleep during the day when the cave is open. If a bat is sighted, the Forest Service recommends that it be left undisturbed. Waking it from hibernation is extremely stressful, and can cause the bat to die from the sudden expenditure of energy.

== History ==
The presence of obsidian flakes near the cave has led archaeologists to conclude that Native Americans knew about the caves long before any pioneers arrived in the Oregon Country. The first recorded discovery is credited to a local settler named Leander Dillman, who found the cave opening on a hunting trip in 1889. Legend has it that Dillman found the cave entrance while following a wounded deer. After its discovery, he used the cave to cool his venison. The cave acquired its name from a 1923 geology study published by Ira A. Williams. The study also provided the first map of the cave. In 1938, the highway department announced an effort to resume digging efforts originally started by Emil Long to extend the cave beyond the dirt choke. It was speculated the cave could go all the way to Benham Falls.

In 1926, the Shevlin-Hixon Lumber Company donated the 22.5-acre (91,000 m^{2}) site around the cave entrance to the State of Oregon for a park. In 1981, the cave and above ground park area were acquired by the Forest Service as part of a land exchange with the State government. In November 1990, the cave was incorporated into the Newberry National Volcanic Monument. However, it is still managed by the Forest Service along with the rest of the Newberry monument area.

== Cave tour ==
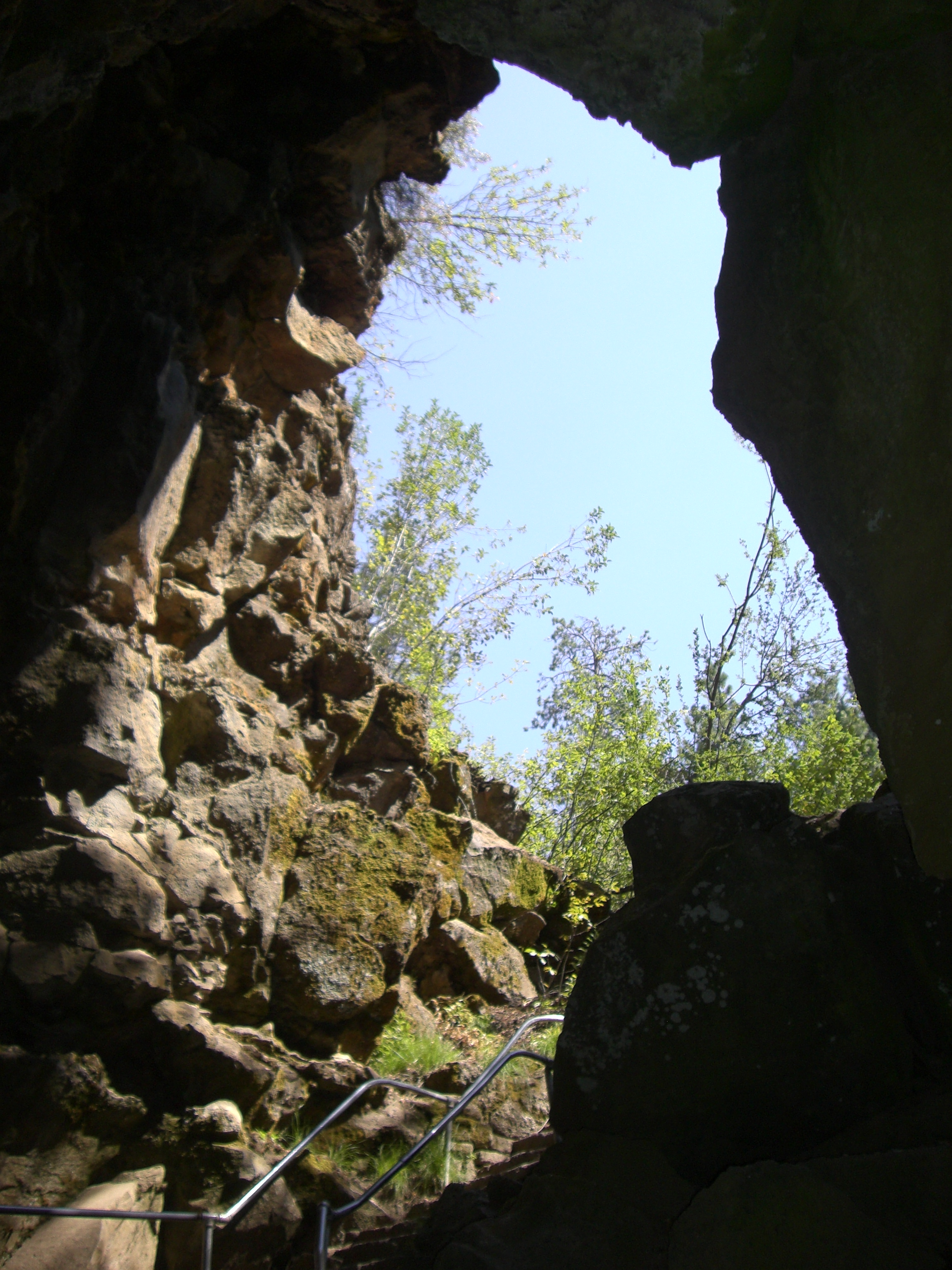
Cave mouth seen from the Collapsed Corridor

Lava River Cave runs in two directions from the entrance cleft. The main section runs gradually downhill 5,211 feet (1,588 m) in a northwesterly direction from the entrance, passing under Highway 97. This section of the cave is the longest known uncollapsed lava tube in Oregon. The other section extends 1,560 feet (480 m) southeast from the entrance. This section runs toward the source of the flow so it has a slight uphill grade. This section is not open to the public because of loose rocks in the ceiling. The mouth of the cave is at an elevation of 4,500 feet (1,400 m) above sea level. At its deepest point the cave is 4,350 feet (1,330 m) above sea level.

The cave's entrance appears as a large hole in the ground. At its mouth, the entrance trail drops suddenly over a jumble of volcanic rocks. This area is known as the Collapsed Corridor. It is the result of ground water freezing in rock cracks in the ceiling. Loosened rocks eventually fall. Over the centuries, the fallen rocks have accumulated into a large boulder pile. Since freezing temperatures occurs only near the mouth of the cave, most rock-falls are in this area. To get down the rock pile, visitor must descend 126 steps with handrails for safety. At the bottom of the stairs is a large cool chamber where winter ice fills cracks in the floor and ice stalactites often cling to the ceiling until June.

After a short walk, the ceiling reaches a height of 58 feet (18 m). At this point, the width of the cave is 50 feet (15 m). This massive volcanic archway is called Echo Hall. The smooth walls are remarkably symmetrical so sounds echo in the huge chamber. In this section, remnants of the ancient lava flow's current can be seen molded in the tunnel walls. They appear as rounded over-hanging shelves and lateral markings etched in the walls. The end of this hall is about 1,500 feet (460 m) into the cave. At that point, the cave passes under Highway 97. The underground crossing is marked by a small sign post.

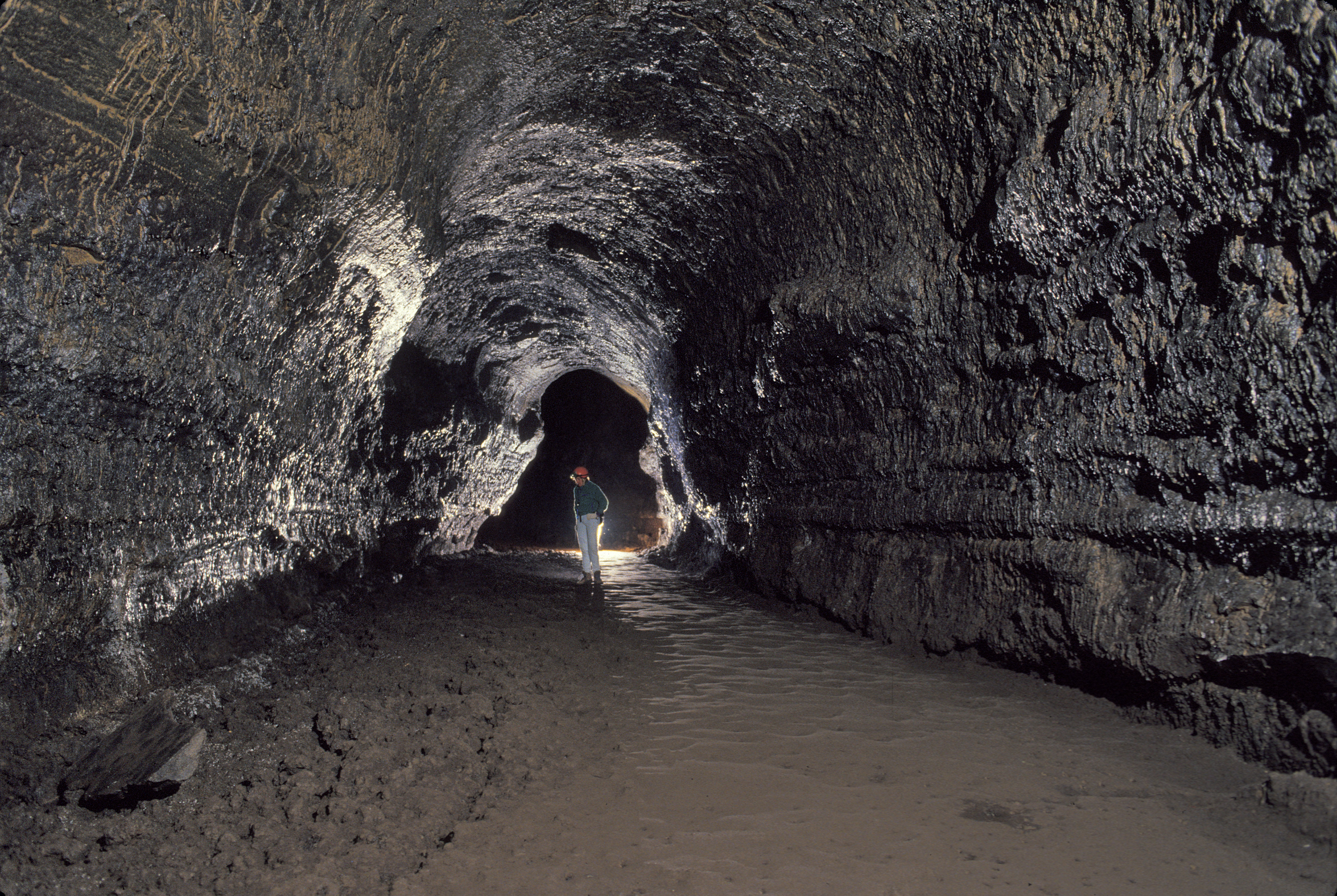
Good view of the interior of Lava River Cave in Oregon showing intact wall linings.

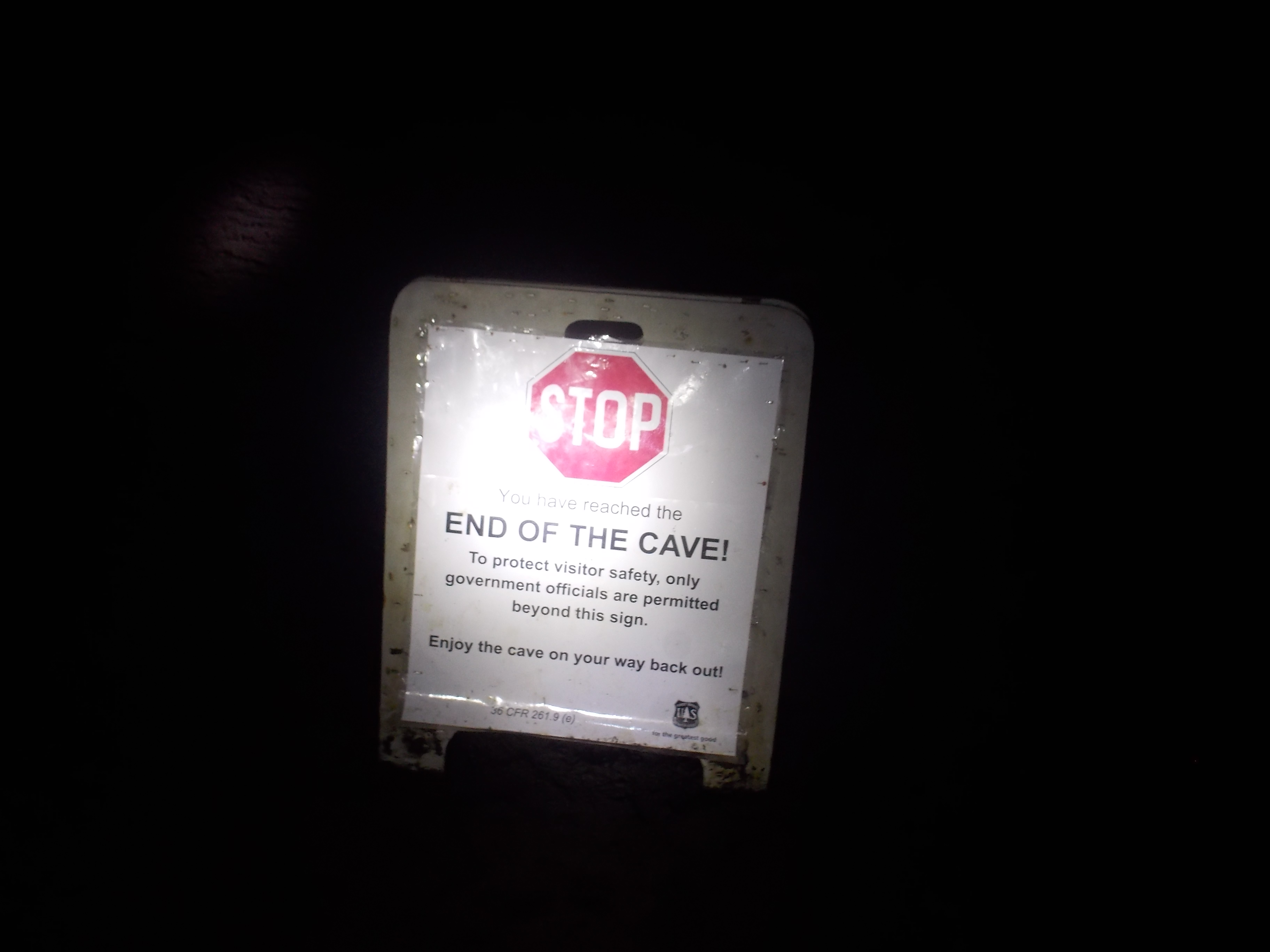
Sign towards the end of the cave warning visitors not to continue any farther.

Beyond the Highway 97 marker, visitors enter an area called Low Bridge Lane. In this area, the ceiling drops to less than six feet (1.8 m). This section of the cave was created after most of the molten lava had drained out of the cave leaving hot gases trapped in the interior of the tube. These gases re-heated the lava tube causing the tunnel walls to re-melt. As re-melted rocks cooled, the walls were left with a shiny, glazed surface. There are also volcanic stalactites in this area of the cave. These formations are sometimes called lavacicles. They are found in two forms. Some are hollow cylindrically shaped soda straws, formed by escaping gases. The others are cone shaped drip pendants formed when re-melted lava dripped from the ceiling. At the end of Low Bridge area, the tube begins to narrow and the cave is divided into two tunnels with intermittent connecting passages. This is the Two Tube Tunnel section of the cave. Both tubes were probably active lava channels at the same time; however, the upper channel eventually drained into the lower tube as the flow subsided.

One of the most unusual parts of the cave is the Sand Garden, located about 3,000 feet (910 m) from the entrance. Here the floor of the cave is covered with sand. The sand was carried into the cave by dripping water. The sand is fine volcanic ash from the eruption of Mount Mazama 6,600 years ago. Rain and melting snow carried the ash down from the surface through cracks in the rock and deposited it on the floor of the cave one grain at a time. Occasionally, enough water leaks into the cave to create a pool. This allows the sand to spread out across the floor. At the Sand Garden, the constant dripping of water has carved spires and pinnacles in the sand. Since it takes hundreds of years to build these delicate sand forms, the Forest Service has fenced off the garden area to protect it. The 2,211 feet (674 m) of cave trail beyond the Sand Garden has a sandy floor. Along the way, the ceiling descends lower and lower until the sand fills the cave. The last 310 feet (94 m) of the cave was dug out of the sand plug by two men in the 1930s. Exploring this section of the cave requires visitors to crawl on hands and knees for much of the distance to the cave's end, and usually takes at least thirty minutes.

The air temperature at the mouth of the cave ranges from about 32 degrees to around 45 degrees Fahrenheit (-1 degrees to around 7 degrees Celsius) depending on the time of year. Inside the cave, it is a constant 42 degrees (5.6 degrees Celsius). As a result, the Forest Service strongly recommends that visitors wear a warm jacket while exploring the cave. Lanterns can be rented at the visitor center above the cave entrance. Personal lanterns are also permitted; however, in order to protect the cave's fragile environment, they cannot have glass globes or use kerosene or white gas. Battery powered lights are best, but they must provide reliable illumination for at least one hour.
