= Marce Herz =

American educator and athlete (1911–1964)

- Born: Marcelle Helen Barkley; December 7, 1911; Madras, Oregon
- Died: January 9, 1964 (aged 52); Reno, Nevada
- Occupations: Educator, skier
- Known for: Establishing the Sky Tavern Junior Ski Program
- Spouse: Walter Herz
- Children: 1

Marce Herz (December 7, 1911 – January 9, 1964) was an American educator and professional skier. Herz is known for establishing the Sky Tavern Junior Ski Program at Sky Tavern Ski Area and educating children in preschool and elementary school. A middle school in Reno, Nevada, is named after her.

== Early life and education ==
Marcelle Helen Barkley was born in Madras, Oregon, on December 7, 1911. She was one of eleven children of James Barkley from Kentucky and Viola Barkley, his second wife. In 1916 they moved to Nevada City, Nevada and then to Fairview. A few years later, they later moved to Rocklin and later Sacramento, California.

She set the world record for the 440-yard run in May 1927, and in 1929 at Sacramento High School, she won a U.S. track championship in 800 meter. Herz graduated University of Nevada, Reno with a Bachelor of Science in zoology. She earned a teaching credential for high school in 1933.

== Career ==
Herz began teaching elementary school in rural Nevada communities. She later moved to Mt. Rose Elementary School until World War II, when she began teaching in Hawthorne. She quickly moved to South Lake Tahoe, California, where she ran a one-room school. Towards the end of World War II, Herz opened Fenway School, a preschool in Reno near Mt. Rose Elementary that was in operation between 1945 and at least 1951. In its latter years, the school likely served third through sixth grade and encouraged outdoor education. In 1953 she established Reno Pre-School Inc. in the same location as the Fenway School.

Between 1948 and 1949, Herz, along with Hal Codding and Keaton Ramsey started the Sky Tavern Junior Ski Program for children in Reno. The Nevada State Journal, now known as the Reno Gazette-Journal, reported in October 1953 between 2,500 and 3,000 children were skiing in the program. The program taught several notable athletes, including Dick Dorworth.

Herz also wrote the Slalom Column for what was then the Reno Evening Gazette (now the Reno Gazette-Journal) from 1949 to the early 1960s. She was part of the press corps for the 1960 Winter Olympics.

Herz won the Nevada State Ski Championship in 1949 and 1950.

== Personal life ==
Herz married Howard Herz on January 2, 1946 and they skied together in the Reno Ski Club. They had one child, Howard Herz. She was an avid golfer.

== Death and legacy ==
Herz died on January 9, 1964, due to metastatic carcinoma. The Sky Tavern Junior Ski Program is now the largest nonprofit skiing and snowboarding organization in the United States. Marce Herz Middle School in Reno, Nevada, is named after her.
