= Round Butte Dam =

- Location: Jefferson County, Oregon, U.S.
- Coordinates: 44°36′11″N 121°16′40″W
- Opening date: 1964
- Construction cost: $62 million
- Operator(s): Portland General Electric Co

Dam and spillways
- Impounds: Deschutes River
- Height: 440 feet (130 m)
- Length: 1,450 feet (442 m)
- Width (base): 1,570 feet (480 m)

Reservoir
- Creates: Lake Billy Chinook
- Total capacity: 535,000 acre-feet (0.660 km^{3})
- Catchment area: 7,514 square miles (19,500 km^{2})
- Surface area: 4,000 acres (16.2 km^{2})

Power Station
- Installed capacity: 367 MW

Round Butte Dam is a rockfill-type hydroelectric dam on the Deschutes River, in the U.S. state of Oregon.

Located in Jefferson County and owned by the power company Portland General Electric, its reservoir is called Lake Billy Chinook.

The dam was completed in 1965 after three years of construction. More than 10 million tons of earth-fill were used to create this 440-foot tall, 1,320-foot wide, and 1,570-foot thick at the base storage dam.

== See also ==
- List of lakes in Oregon
