= Lake Billy Chinook Airport =

Lake Billy Chinook Airport Lake Billy Chinook State Airport
- IATA: none; ICAO: none; FAA LID: 5S5

Summary
- Airport type: Public use
- Owner: Lake Billy Chinook Airport Dev. Corp.
- Serves: Culver, Oregon
- Elevation AMSL: 2,695 ft / 821 m
- Coordinates: 44°31′09″N 121°19′14″W

Map
- Location of airport in Oregon

Runways
Direction	Length		Surface
Direction	ft	m	Surface
16/34	2,500	762	Asphalt

Statistics (2010)
- Aircraft operations: 560
- Based aircraft: 10
- Source: Federal Aviation Administration

Lake Billy Chinook Airport, also known as Lake Billy Chinook State Airport, (FAA LID: 5S5) is a public use airport located six nautical miles (7 mi, 11 km) west of the central business district of Culver, a city in Jefferson County, Oregon, United States. The airport is privately owned, despite the name which might give the impression that it was owned by the state.

== Facilities and aircraft ==
Lake Billy Chinook Airport covers an area of 29 acres (12 ha) at an elevation of 2,695 feet (821 m) above mean sea level. It has one runway designated 16/34 with an asphalt surface measuring 2,500 by 32 feet (762 x 10 m).

For the 12-month period ending April 13, 2010, the airport had 560 general aviation aircraft operations, an average of 46 per month. At that time there were 10 aircraft based at this airport: 90% single-engine and 10% multi-engine.
