= Lava Island Falls =

- Interactive map of Lava Island Falls
- Location: near Bend, Oregon
- Coordinates: 43°59′12″N 121°23′53″W
- Type: Segmented/Cascade
- Elevation: 3,900 ft (1,200 m)
- Total height: 15 feet (4.6 m)
- Number of drops: 2
- Average width: 75 feet (23 m)

Lava Island Falls are rapids on the Deschutes River. Rated a Class 5 for watercraft, they are difficult to navigate because of an island of lava from Lava Butte that blocked part of the river.
