= Deschutes River =

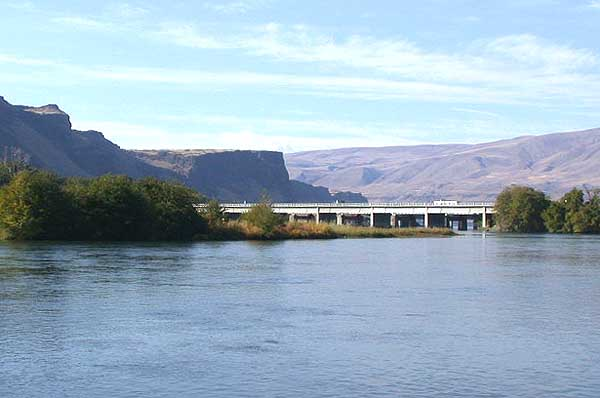
- The Deschutes River near its mouth on the Columbia. Pioneers camped on the bluff to the left.

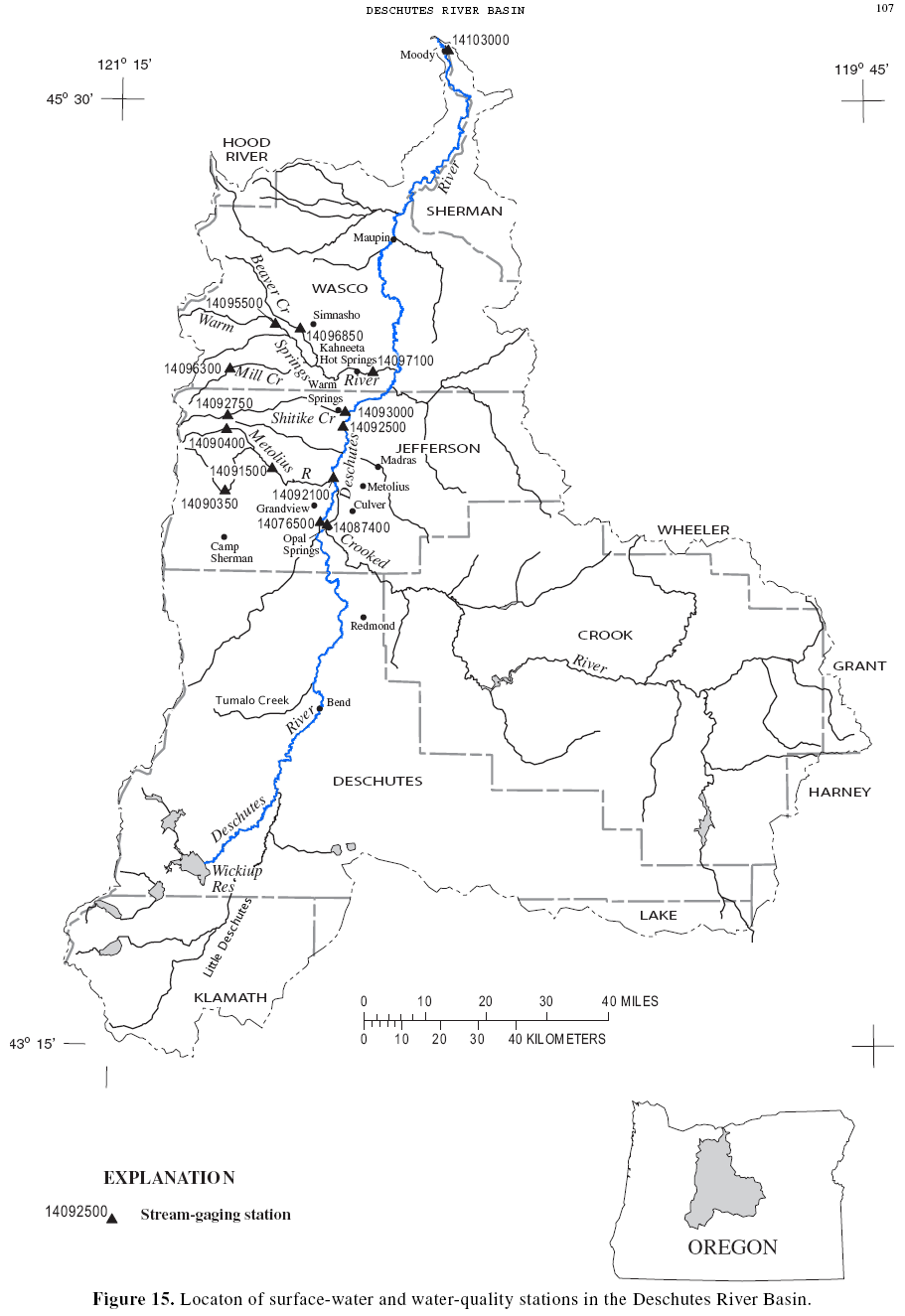
- Map of the Deschutes watershed

- Location of the mouth of the Deschutes River in Oregon Deschutes River (the United States)
- Etymology: From Rivière des Chutes, used by early-19th-century fur traders

Location
- Country: United States
- State: Oregon
- County: Deschutes, Jefferson, Sherman, and Wasco

Physical characteristics
- Source: Little Lava Lake
  - location: Cascade Range, Deschutes County, Oregon
  - coordinates: 43°54′33″N 121°45′40″W
  - elevation: 4,747 ft (1,447 m)
- Mouth: Columbia River
  - location: between Fairbanks and Biggs Junction, on border between Wasco and Sherman counties, Oregon
  - coordinates: 45°38′07″N 120°54′52″W
  - elevation: 164 ft (50 m)
- Length: 252 mi (406 km)
- Basin size: 10,500 sq mi (27,000 km^{2})
- Discharge
  - location: Moody, 1.4 miles (2.3 km) from mouth
  - average: 5,824 cu ft/s (164.9 m^{3}/s)
  - minimum: 2,400 cu ft/s (68 m^{3}/s)
  - maximum: 70,300 cu ft/s (1,990 m^{3}/s)

National Wild and Scenic River
- Type: Scenic, Recreational
- Designated: October 28, 1988

The Deschutes River (/dəˈʃuːts/ də-SHOOTS) in central Oregon is a major tributary of the Columbia River. The river provides much of the drainage on the eastern side of the Cascade Range in Oregon, gathering many of the tributaries that descend from the drier, eastern flank of the mountains. The Deschutes provided an important route to and from the Columbia for Native Americans for thousands of years, and then in the 19th century for pioneers on the Oregon Trail. The river flows mostly through rugged and arid country, and its valley provides a cultural heart for central Oregon. Today the river supplies water for irrigation and is popular in the summer for whitewater rafting and fishing.

The Deschutes flows generally north, as do several other large Oregon tributaries of the Columbia River, including the Willamette and John Day.

== Course ==
The headwaters of the Deschutes River are at Little Lava Lake, a natural lake in the Cascade Range approximately 26 miles (42 km) northwest of the city of La Pine. The river flows south into Crane Prairie Reservoir, then into Wickiup Reservoir, from where it heads in a northeasterly direction past the resort community of Sunriver and into the city of Bend, about 170 miles (270 km) from the river mouth on the Columbia.

In central Bend, the river enters Mirror Pond, an impoundment behind Newport hydroelectric dam. The pond extends upstream to the Galveston Bridge and is a feature of Drake Park as well as Harmon, Pageant, and Brooks parks. From April through October, diversions to Central Oregon Irrigation District canals reduce the river flow between Bend and Pelton Reregulating Dam, at river mile (RM) 100 (river kilometer (RK) 160).

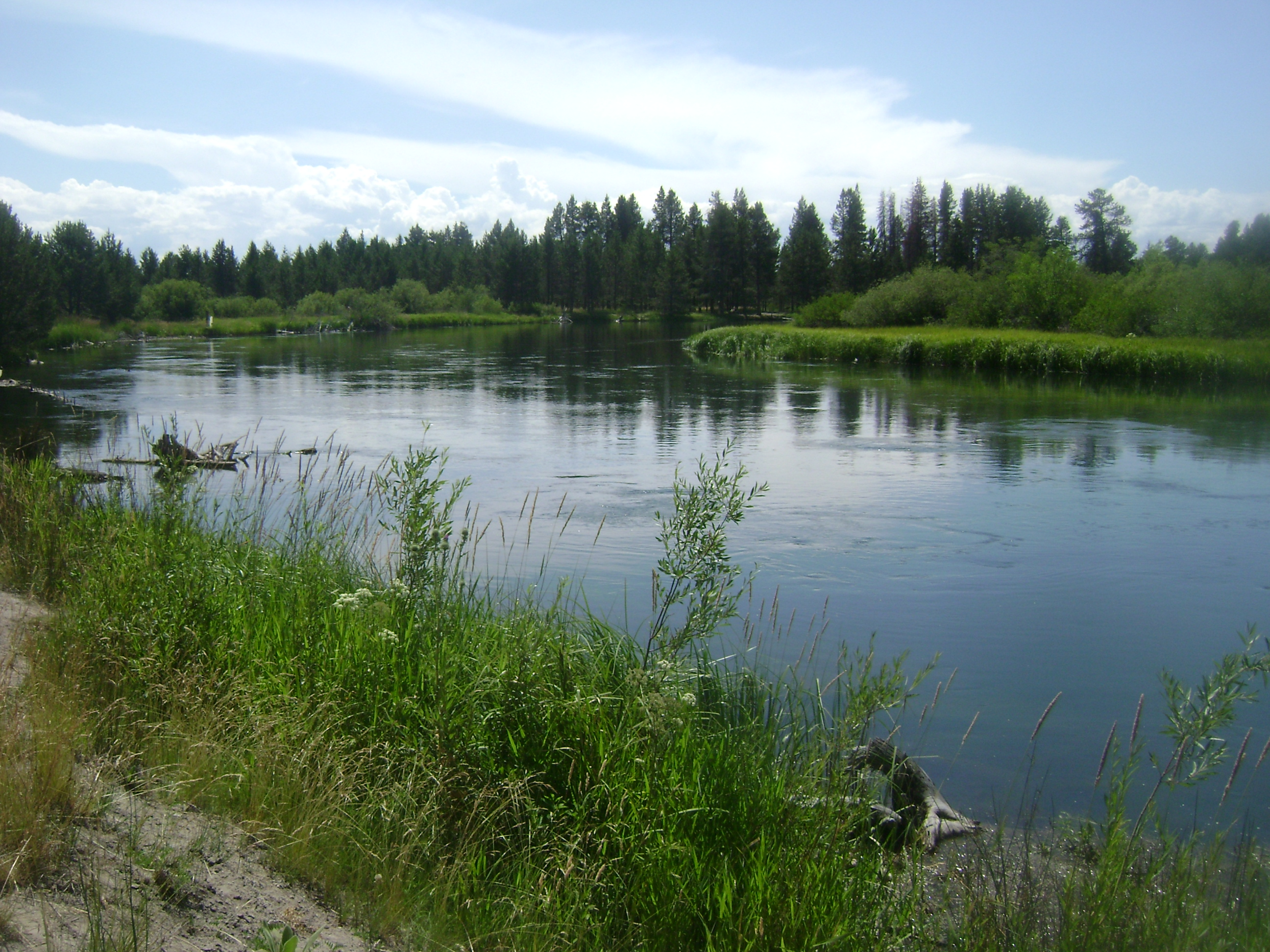
The river as it passes Sunriver, near Benham Falls

The river continues north from Bend, and just west of Redmond, Oregon. Here it passes by Eagle Crest Resort and Cline Falls State Scenic Viewpoint. As it heads north through the central Oregon high desert, the river carves a gorge bordered by large basalt cliffs. By the time it reaches Lake Billy Chinook, a reservoir west of Madras, the river is approximately 300 feet (91 m) below the surrounding plateau, the Little Agency Plains and Agency Plains. At Lake Billy Chinook the river is joined by the Crooked and Metolius rivers.

Beyond the dam, the river continues north in a gorge well below the surrounding countryside. It passes through the Warm Springs Indian Reservation, which includes the city of Warm Springs and the Kah-Nee-Ta resort. The river ends at its confluence with the Columbia River, 5 miles (8 km) southwest of Biggs Junction and 204 miles (328 km) from the Columbia's mouth on the Pacific Ocean.

=== Tributaries ===
Named tributaries of the Deschutes River from source to mouth include Snow Creek then the Cultus River, Cultus Creek and Deer Creek, which enter at Crane Prairie Reservoir. Further downstream come the Fall River, the Little Deschutes River, and the Spring River followed by Tumalo Creek and Whychus Creek.

The Metolius River and the Crooked River are next, both entering at Lake Billy Chinook. Then come Seekseequa Creek and Willow Creek followed by Dry Hollow and Campbell, Shitike and Trout creeks, after which comes the Warm Springs River. Further downstream are Swamp, Skookum, Oak, Antoken, Cove, Eagle, Nena, Wapinitia and Bakeoven creeks. Spring Creek is next, followed by Oak Springs Creek and the White River. Below that are Winterwater and Elder creeks.

== History ==
Prior to 80,000 years ago, the river ran along the east side of Pilot Butte and a lava flow from Lava Top Butte filled in this ancient channel. Previously, the basalt of the Bend lava flow, associated with the Lava River Cave, had diverted the river westward to its present-day location.

The river was named Rivière des Chutes or Rivière aux Chutes, French for River of the Falls, during the period of fur trading. The waterfall it referred to was the Celilo Falls on the Columbia River, near where the Deschutes flowed into it. (These falls no longer exist, having been inundated by the lake behind The Dalles Dam).

Lewis and Clark encountered the river on October 22, 1805, and referred to it by the Native American name Towarnehiooks; on their return journey they gave it the new name Clarks River. Variant names include Clarks River, River of the Falls, Riviere des Chutes, Chutes River, and Falls River.

During the middle 19th century, the river was a major obstacle for immigrants on the Oregon Trail. The major crossing point on the river was near its mouth in present-day Deschutes River State Recreation Area. Many immigrants camped on the bluff on the west side of the river after making the crossing. The remains of the trail leading up to the top of the bluff are still visible.

In 1910, Mirror Pond was created by the construction of the Bend Water, Light & Power Company dam on the river in Bend. The dam provided the city with its initial source of electricity. The dam has been owned by Pacific Power since 1930 and still produces electricity that supplies approximately 400 Bend households.

In 1908, two competing railroad companies, the Deschutes Railroad and the Oregon Trunk Railway, raced to build a line from the mouth of the river to Bend. The Deschutes Railroad, a Union Pacific subsidiary, was owned by Edward H. Harriman and the Oregon Trunk was owned by James J. Hill.

In 1964, on the Deschutes River, Portland General Electric (PGE) built, what was at the time, the largest hydroelectric dam in Oregon. This dam, named Round Butte Dam, stands 440 feet (130 m) above Lake Simtustus, a 611-acre (247 ha) reservoir impounded by Pelton Dam.

== Fishing ==
The Deschutes River is world-renowned for its fly fishing. It is home to Columbia River redband trout (Oncorhynchus mykiss gairdneri) known locally as "redsides", which are a subspecies of rainbow trout. The redsides are known for their large spots and a distinct dark red stripe. The average Deschutes redside is 8 to 15 inches (20 to 38 cm), though some fish are much larger. Redside trout can be found throughout the river from the river's headwaters section to the lower reaches near the Deschutes confluence with the Columbia River.

The 100-mile (160 km) stretch of the river from the Pelton Round Butte Dam complex to the river mouth is considered by some to be one of America's most productive wild trout waters, along with a top producer of summer steelhead. This stretch of river drops 1,233 feet (376 m), carving a volcanic rock canyon 700 to 2,200 feet (213 to 671 m) deep.

Fishing for Deschutes redsides is most popular in the lower Deschutes River, with many anglers focusing their efforts from Warm Springs down to Macks Canyon. The Warm Springs Reservation owns the entire Deschutes west bank from 16 miles (26 km) south of Maupin, upstream to Lake Billy Chinook and on up to Jefferson Creek on the Metolius River arm. Fishing from Tribal lands requires special permits.

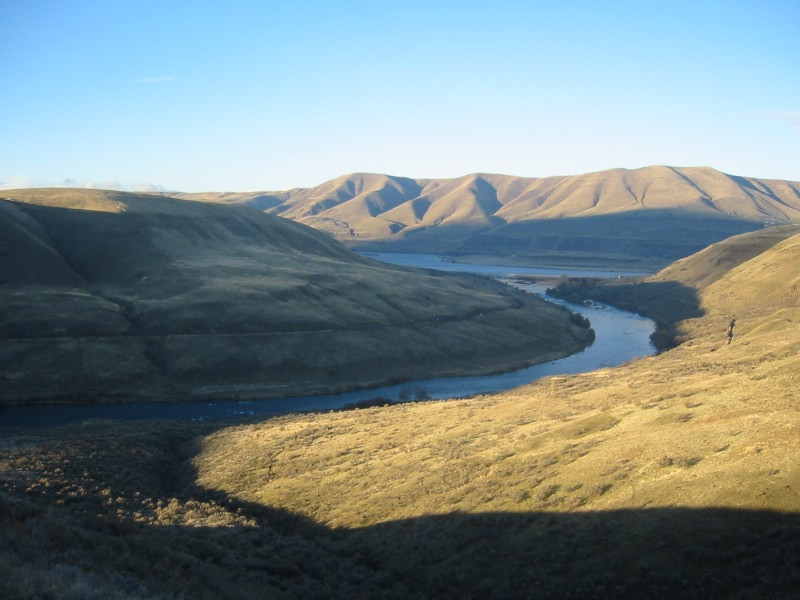
The Deschutes in winter at its confluence with the Columbia

The most popular time to fly fish for trout on the Deschutes River begins in May through the first two weeks in June to take advantage of hatching salmonflies and golden stoneflies.

Sport fishing for Steelhead occurs in the river from the mouth to the Pelton Round Butte Dam Complex, while sport fishing for spring and fall Chinook salmon occurs from the mouth to Sherars Falls. Tribal fishing for Chinook and steelhead occurs at Sherars Falls.

Deschutes River anglers fishing for steelhead primarily utilize tactics including fly fishing with floating lines and dry flies, swinging wet flies, and fishing hardware such as spinners, spoons, and plugs. Lower steelhead returns in some recent years have resulted in steelhead fishing closures on the Deschutes, including in 2026.

One unique feature of fishing the lower Deschutes River is that fishing from a floating device is strictly prohibited. Anglers must be standing in the river or from the bank to fish legally. However, disabled anglers may fish from a boat in this section of river with the appropriate permit.

Additional sport fishing opportunities are available in what is referred to as the middle Deschutes River, stretching from Lake Billy Chinook, upstream through Bend, Sunriver and all the way up to Wickiup Dam. Fishing in this section is subject to river flows, which can vary dramatically due to irrigation needs.

The Upper Deschutes River, from its source at Little Lava Lake before emptying into Crane Prairie Reservoir 12 miles downstream, is a small, meandering mountain stream with populations of native rainbow trout, mountain whitefish, along with introduced brook trout. The Oregon state record brook trout, weighing over 9 pounds, was caught in this headwaters section of the Deschutes. The headwaters section of the river features a forested landscape, meadows, and smaller, easily wadeable riffles stand in stark contrast to the wild, fast-moving lower river which flows through desert canyons.

The four major reservoirs on the river, Crane Prairie Reservoir, Wickiup Reservoir, Lake Billy Chinook, and Lake Simtustus, all offer a variety of sport fishing opportunities as well.

== River use ==
Much of the flow of the upper Deschutes River is diverted into canals to irrigate farmland; irrigation districts take nearly 98% of the river's flow in the summer months. The growth of cities like Bend and Redmond also increased demand on the river's water, which is over-allocated. Because the existing canals lose about half of their water due to seepage, there is pressure to convert these canals into pipelines, a move that is resisted by many locals for historic and aesthetic reasons. Golf courses have also been an issue with water allocation. There are 13 golf courses throughout Bend, Redmond, and Sunriver.

There are primarily two sections of the river popular for whitewater rafting and kayaking. The upstream section known as the Big Eddy is a short segment upriver from the city of Bend between Dillon and Lava Island falls. The lower and more heavily used section is from the town of Warm Springs downstream to just above Sherars Falls. The densest use is from RM 56—about 4 miles (6.4 km) above Maupin—to RM 44, just above Sherars Falls.

== See also ==
- List of longest streams of Oregon
- List of National Wild and Scenic Rivers
- List of rivers of Oregon
