= Madras, Oregon =

- City
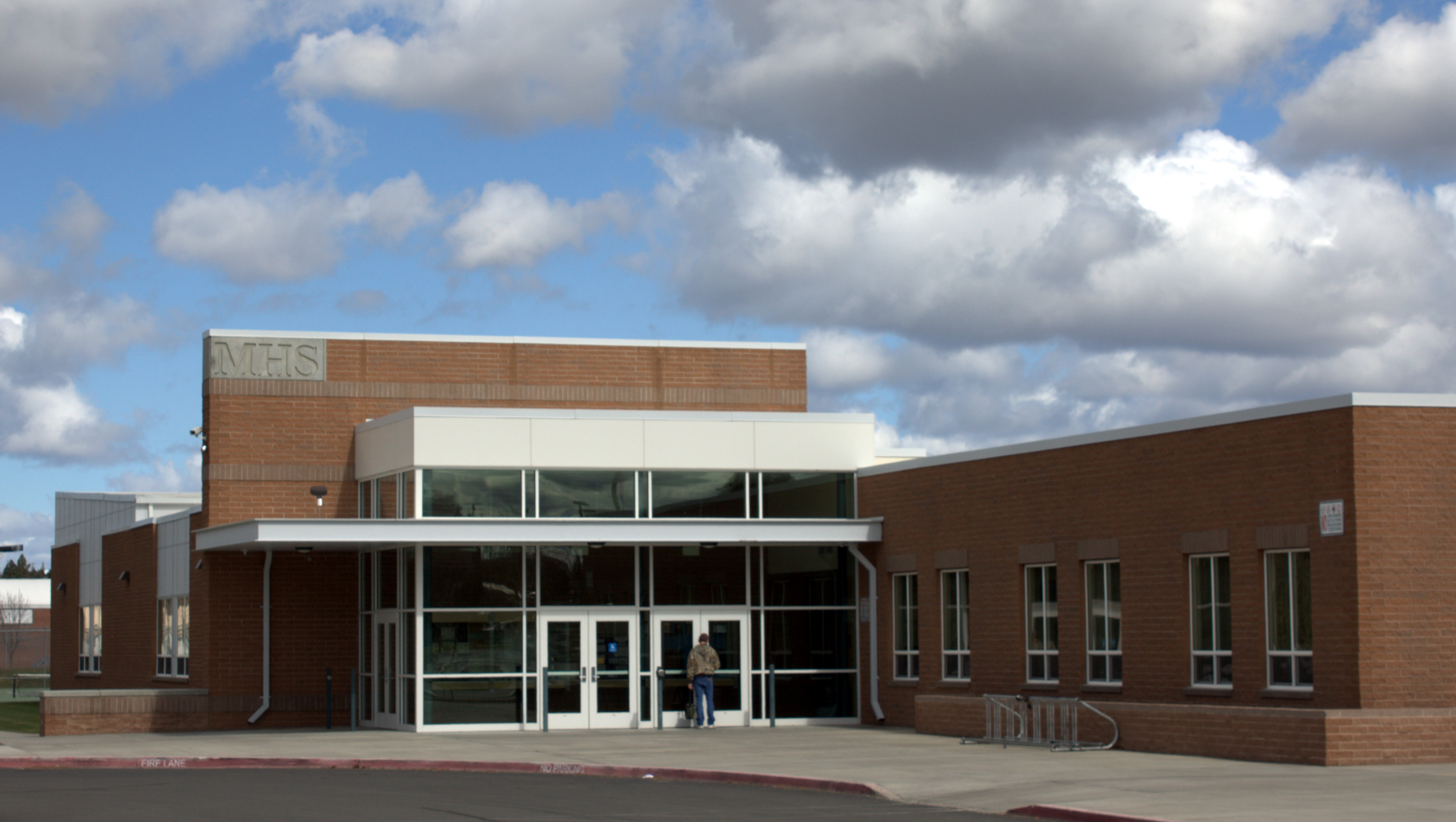
- High school in Madras

- Location in Oregon
- Coordinates: 44°37′50″N 121°7′45″W
- Country: United States
- State: Oregon
- County: Jefferson
- Incorporated: 1911

Government
  - Mayor: Mike Lepin

Area
  - Total: 8.16 sq mi (21.13 km^{2})
  - Land: 8.16 sq mi (21.13 km^{2})
  - Water: 0 sq mi (0.00 km^{2})
- Elevation: 2,241 ft (683 m)

Population (2020)
  - Total: 7,456
  - Density: 914.0/sq mi (352.88/km^{2})
- Time zone: UTC-8 (Pacific)
  - Summer (DST): UTC-7 (Pacific)
- ZIP code: 97741
- Area code: 541
- FIPS code: 41-45250
- GNIS feature ID: 1145724
- Website: www.madras.gov

Madras (/ˈmædrʌs/ MAD-russ) is a city in and the county seat of Jefferson County, Oregon, United States. Situated in Central Oregon, it is located where US Route 26 and US Route 97 intersect, with the latter serving as the main north-south road in the city with traffic split into a one-way pair. Originally called "The Basin" after the circular valley the city is in, it is unclear whether Madras was named in 1903 for the cotton fabric called "Madras" that originated in the city of Madras (now Chennai) in Tamil Nadu, India, or the city itself. The population was 7,456 at the 2020 census.

== History ==
The original plat for Madras was filed on July 18, 1902, by Scandinavian immigrant John A. Palmehn, for whom the town was originally named "Palmain". The name was rejected by the U.S. Postal Service over its similarity to a post office named Parmen, and the name "Madras" was adopted, inspired by the cloth fabric of the same name, itself named for the city of Madras (now Chennai) in India.

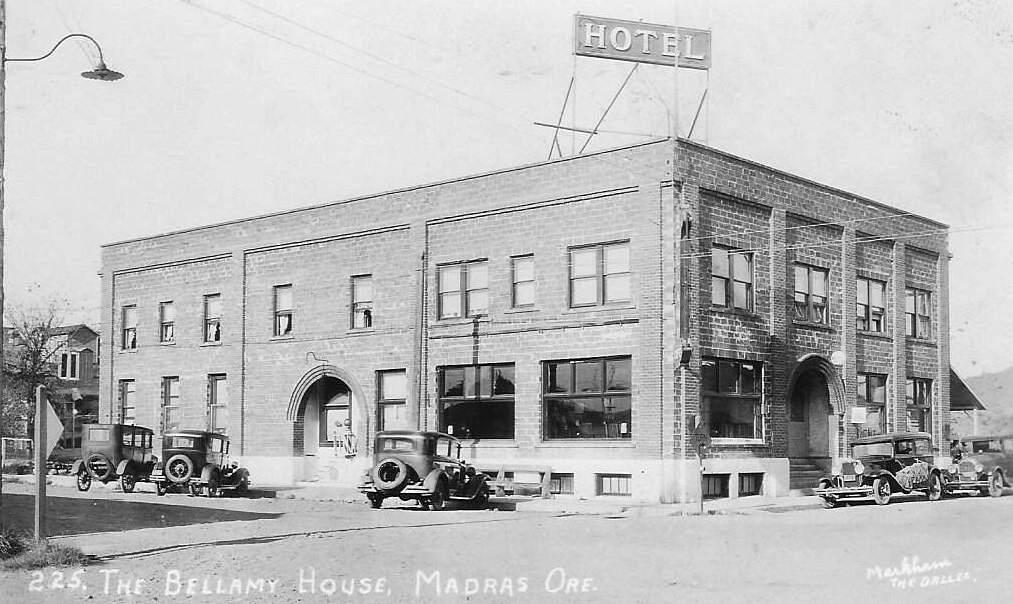
Bellamy House in Madras, seen in a real photo postcard c. 1920

Madras was incorporated as a city in 1911. An Army Air Corps base, Madras Army Air Field, was built nearby during World War II. This airfield now serves as the Madras Municipal Airport. Homesteads approximately 5 miles (8 km) north of the city on Agency Plains were based on dryland wheat.

=== GMO incident ===
In 2003, a Scotts Company large field trial of GMO bentgrass near Madras resulted in pollen spreading the transgene, which is Roundup-resistant, over an area of 120 square miles (310 km^{2}). Because the grower could not remove all genetically engineered plants, the U.S. Department of Agriculture fined the grower $500,000 for non-compliance with regulations in 2007.

=== 2017 solar eclipse ===
The centerline of the path of totality of the solar eclipse of August 21, 2017, ran through the center of Madras. Because the city is located in a high desert environment and has consistently clear skies in August, it was considered a prime eclipse viewing location. All of the hotel and motel rooms in the area had been reserved for several years. The town had prepared for an influx of about 100,000 visitors for the eclipse.

== Sights ==
Madras is home to the Erickson Aircraft Collection, a privately owned collection of airworthy vintage aircraft. The collection is open to the public Tuesday through Sunday, 10 a.m. to 5 p.m. The Jefferson County Fair is held on county property along Fairgrounds Road in Madras. The annual fair takes place in late July.

== Geography and climate ==
According to the United States Census Bureau, the city has a total area of 5.02 square miles (13 km^{2}), all land.

Madras has a steppe climate (BSk) according to the Köppen climate classification system, also known as semi-arid.

Climate data for Madras
Month	Jan	Feb	Mar	Apr	May	Jun	Jul	Aug	Sep	Oct	Nov	Dec	Year
Record high °F (°C)	70 (21)	76 (24)	82 (28)	91 (33)	101 (38)	111 (44)	112 (44)	109 (43)	104 (40)	93 (34)	80 (27)	68 (20)	112 (44)
Mean daily maximum °F (°C)	41.7 (5.4)	47.6 (8.7)	55.2 (12.9)	62.2 (16.8)	70.3 (21.3)	77.7 (25.4)	87.1 (30.6)	86.0 (30.0)	77.9 (25.5)	65.3 (18.5)	50.6 (10.3)	42.5 (5.8)	63.7 (17.6)
Mean daily minimum °F (°C)	22.1 (−5.5)	25.0 (−3.9)	27.3 (−2.6)	30.0 (−1.1)	35.9 (2.2)	41.6 (5.3)	45.1 (7.3)	43.6 (6.4)	38.0 (3.3)	31.2 (−0.4)	27.1 (−2.7)	23.2 (−4.9)	32.5 (0.3)
Record low °F (°C)	−40 (−40)	−34 (−37)	−7 (−22)	6 (−14)	11 (−12)	19 (−7)	26 (−3)	21 (−6)	9 (−13)	−2 (−19)	−15 (−26)	−45 (−43)	−45 (−43)
Average precipitation inches (mm)	1.15 (29)	0.82 (21)	0.74 (19)	0.7 (18)	0.95 (24)	0.8 (20)	0.34 (8.6)	0.33 (8.4)	0.48 (12)	0.71 (18)	1.28 (33)	1.26 (32)	9.56 (243)
Average snowfall inches (cm)	4.8 (12)	2.1 (5.3)	0.7 (1.8)	0.1 (0.25)	0 (0)	0 (0)	0 (0)	0 (0)	0 (0)	0 (0)	1.4 (3.6)	3 (7.6)	12.1 (31)
Average precipitation days	9	8	7	6	7	5	2	2	3	5	9	9	72

== Demographics ==
=== 2020 census ===
As of the 2020 census, Madras had a population of 7,456. The median age was 33.8 years. 27.6% of residents were under the age of 18 and 14.8% were 65 years of age or older. For every 100 females there were 94.2 males, and for every 100 females age 18 and over there were 91.4 males age 18 and over.

97.9% of residents lived in urban areas, while 2.1% lived in rural areas.

There were 2,706 households in Madras, of which 37.3% had children under the age of 18 living in them. Of all households, 40.4% were married-couple households, 18.3% were households with a male householder and no spouse or partner present, and 31.6% were households with a female householder and no spouse or partner present. About 27.4% of all households were made up of individuals and 13.5% had someone living alone who was 65 years of age or older.

There were 2,878 housing units, of which 6.0% were vacant. Among occupied housing units, 50.4% were owner-occupied and 49.6% were renter-occupied. The homeowner vacancy rate was 1.5% and the rental vacancy rate was 4.0%.

Racial composition as of the 2020 census
Race	Number	Percent
White	4,262	57.2%
Black or African American	20	0.3%
American Indian and Alaska Native	597	8.0%
Asian	72	1.0%
Native Hawaiian and Other Pacific Islander	8	0.1%
Some other race	1,501	20.1%
Two or more races	996	13.4%
Hispanic or Latino (of any race)	2,795	37.5%

=== 2010 census ===
As of the census of 2010, there were 6,046 people, 2,198 households, and 1,430 families residing in the city. The population density was 1,204.4 inhabitants per square mile (465.0/km^{2}). There were 2,569 housing units at an average density of 511.8 per square mile (197.6/km^{2}). The racial makeup of the city was 66.4% White, 0.7% African American, 6.9% Native American, 0.8% Asian, 0.2% Pacific Islander, 19.7% from other races, and 5.4% from two or more races. Hispanic or Latino of any race were 38.5% of the population.

There were 2,198 households, of which 41.2% had children under the age of 18 living with them, 42.5% were married couples living together, 15.9% had a female householder with no husband present, 6.6% had a male householder with no wife present, and 34.9% were non-families. 28.5% of all households were made up of individuals, and 11.2% had someone living alone who was 65 years of age or older. The average household size was 2.69 and the average family size was 3.31.

The median age in the city was 31.2 years. 30.8% of residents were under the age of 18; 10.4% were between the ages of 18 and 24; 27.1% were from 25 to 44; 21.6% were from 45 to 64; and 10.3% were 65 years of age or older. The gender makeup of the city was 49.3% male and 50.7% female.

=== 2000 census ===
As of the census of 2000, there were 5,078 people, 1,801 households, and 1,251 families residing in the city. The population density was 2,326.9 inhabitants per square mile (898.4/km^{2}). There were 1,952 housing units at an average density of 894.5 per square mile (345.4/km^{2}). The racial makeup of the city was 63.55% White, 0.59% African American, 6.14% Native American, 0.55% Asian, 0.35% Pacific Islander, 24.56% from other races, and 4.25% from two or more races. Hispanic or Latino of any race were 35.74% of the population.

There were 1,801 households, out of which 41.0% had children under the age of 18 living with them, 49.2% were married couples living together, 12.9% had a female householder with no husband present, and 30.5% were non-families. 25.3% of all households were made up of individuals, and 9.2% had someone living alone who was 65 years of age or older. The average household size was 2.78 and the average family size was 3.32.

In the city, the population was spread out, with 33.1% under the age of 18, 10.6% from 18 to 24, 29.7% from 25 to 44, 16.1% from 45 to 64, and 10.5% who were 65 years of age or older. The median age was 29 years. For every 100 females, there were 95.3 males. For every 100 females age 18 and over, there were 94.8 males.

The median income for a household in the city was $29,103, and the median income for a family was $33,275. Males had a median income of $27,656 versus $19,464 for females. The per capita income for the city was $12,937. About 15.2% of families and 19.6% of the population were below the poverty line, including 26.3% of those under age 18 and 10.0% of those age 65 or over.

== Infrastructure ==
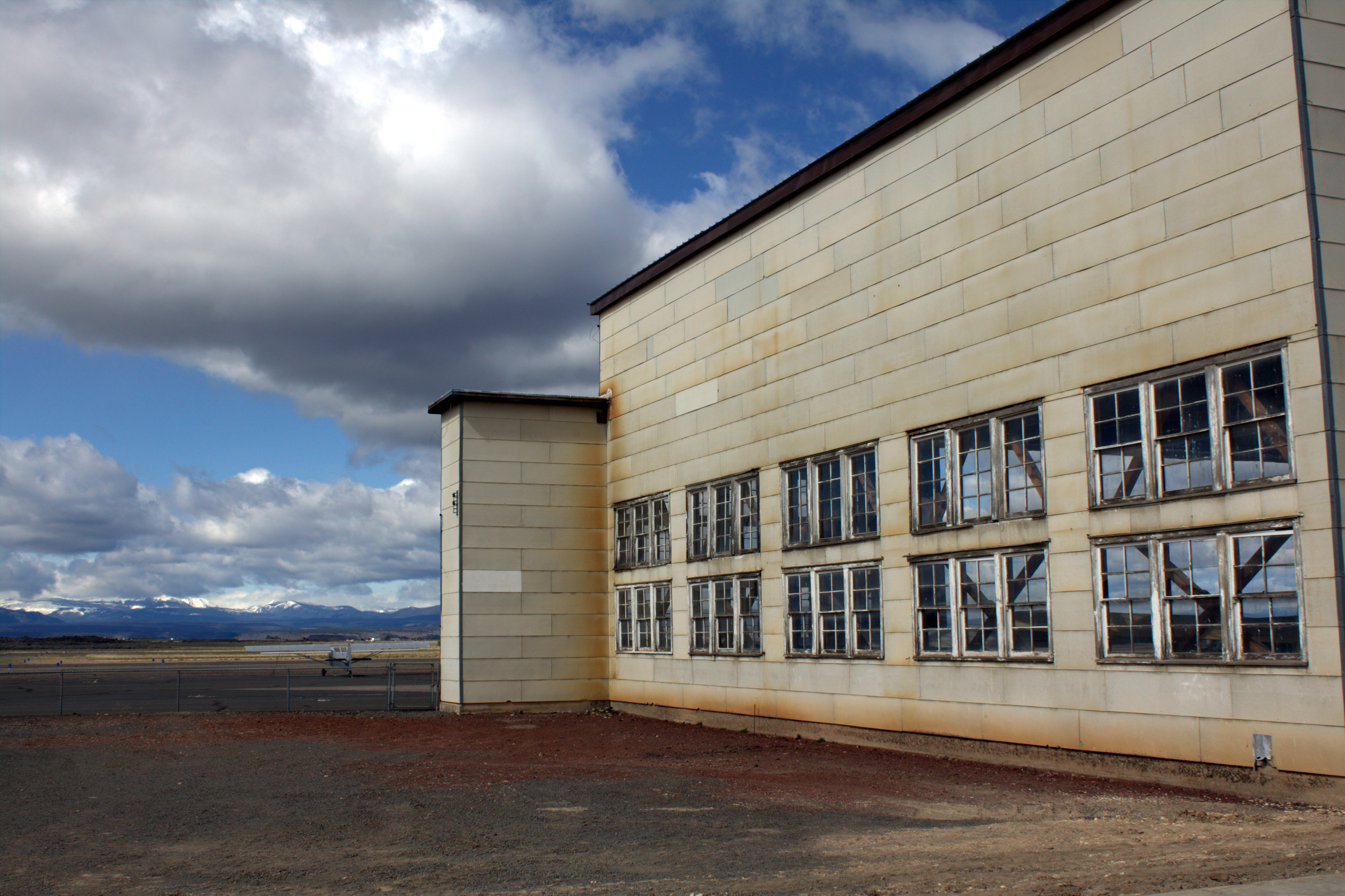
Hangar at the airport

=== Transportation ===
Highway

- U.S. Route 26
- U.S. Route 97

Rail

- BNSF Railway (formerly Oregon Trunk Railway)
- Union Pacific Railroad shares operations on the same tracks

Air

In addition to the public City-County Airport, Madras has several private-use airports in the area:

- Bombay Farms Airport
- St. Charles Madras Heliport
- Ochs Private Airport
- Six Springs Ranch Airport

== Notable people ==
- Jacoby Ellsbury (b. 1983) — Major League Baseball player
- Marce Herz (1911–1964) — educator and professional skier
- Boyd R. Overhulse (1909–1966) — attorney and state legislator
- River Phoenix (1970–1993) — actor born in Madras

== Sister city ==
Madras has one sister city, as designated by Sister Cities International:

- Tōmi, Nagano, Japan (Tōmi was formed in 2004 by merger of Kitamimaki, which was already twinned with Madras, and Tōbu.)

== See also ==
- Madras High School
