= List of National Wild and Scenic Rivers =

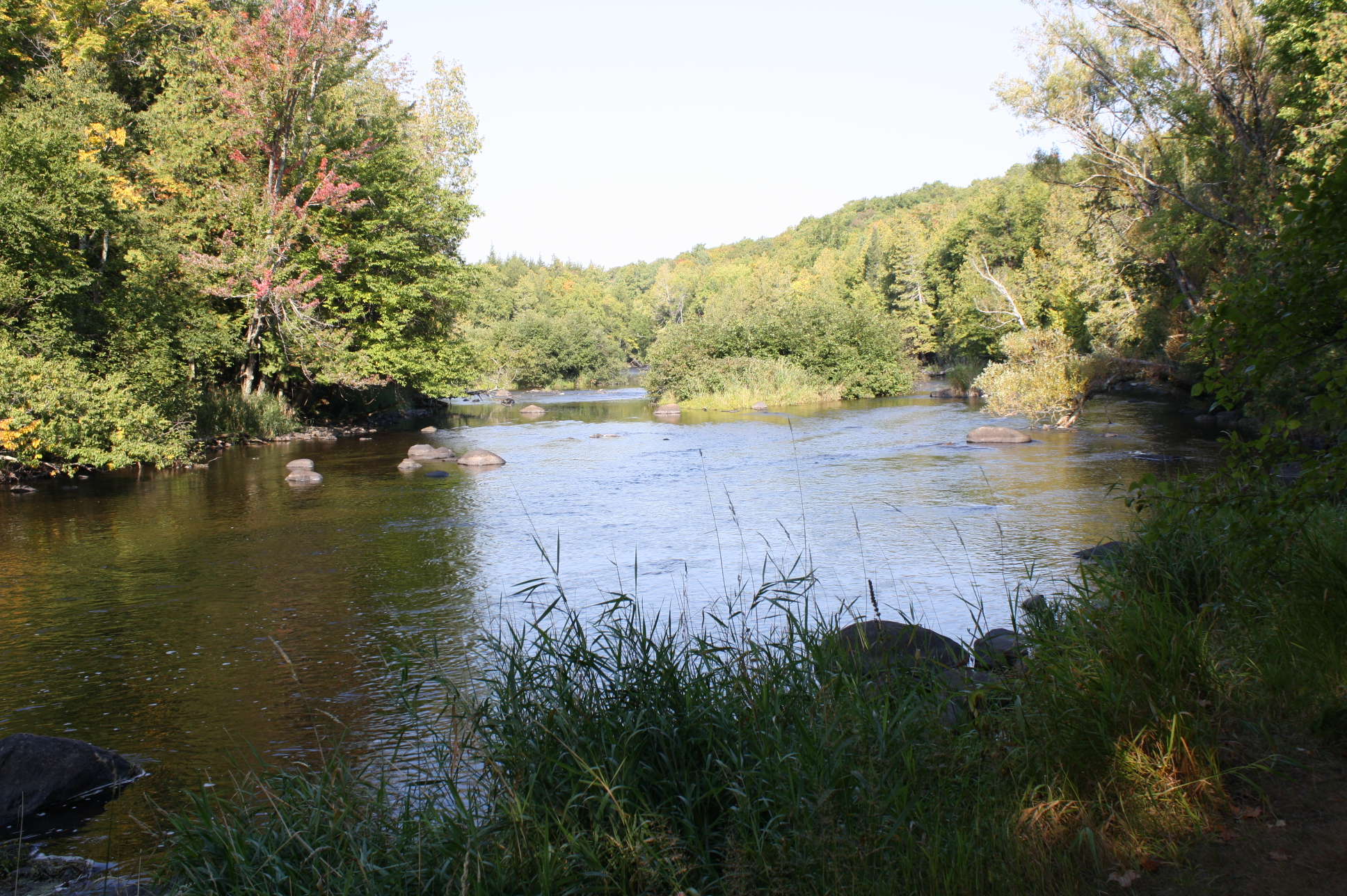
The Wolf River in Wisconsin

This is a list of the designated National Wild and Scenic Rivers in the United States. Each river has been designated by Congress, or, if certain requirements were met, the Secretary of the Interior. A designation may include multiple watercourses; for example, the Saint Croix National Scenic Riverway includes the Namekagon River as well as the St. Croix River.

Rivers are managed by one or more federal, state, local government agencies. Only federal agencies are listed in this table. Abbreviations used are:

- USACE = U.S. Army Corps of Engineers
- BLM = Bureau of Land Management
- NPS = National Park Service
- USFS = United States Forest Service
- USFWS = United States Fish and Wildlife Service

Name	Image	Watercourse(s)	State	Agency	First Designated	Length			
Name	Image	Watercourse(s)	State	Agency	First Designated	Wild	Scenic	Recreational	
Alagnak Wild River		Alagnak River	AK	NPS	Dec 2, 1980	67 mi (108 km)	0	0	
Alatna Wild River		Alatna River, Nonvianuk River	AK	NPS	Dec 2, 1980	83 mi (134 km)	0	0	83 mi (134 km)
Allagash Wilderness Waterway		Allagash River	ME		Jul 19, 1970	92.5 mi (148.9 km)	0	0	92.5 mi (148.9 km)
Allegheny River		Allegheny River	PA	USFS	Apr 20, 1992	0	0	86.6 mi (139.4 km)	86.6 mi (139.4 km)
Amargosa River		Amargosa River	CA	BLM	Mar 30, 2009	7.9 mi (12.7 km)	15.5 mi (24.9 km)	6.3 mi (10.1 km)	29.7 mi (47.8 km)
American River (Lower)		American River	CA		Jan 19, 1981	0	0	23 mi (37 km)	23 mi (37 km)
American River (North Fork)		North Fork American River	CA	BLM, USFS	Nov 10, 1978	38.3 mi (61.6 km)	0	0	38.3 mi (61.6 km)
Andreafsky River		Andreafsky River, East Fork Andreafsky River	AK	USFWS	Dec 2, 1980	262 mi (422 km)	0	0	262 mi (422 km)
Aniakchak Wild River		Aniakchak River, Hidden Creek, Mystery Creek, Albert Johnson Creek, North Fork Aniakchak River	AK	NPS	Dec 2, 1980	63 mi (101 km)	0	0	63 mi (101 km)
Au Sable River		Au Sable River	MI	USFS	Oct 4, 1984	0	23 mi (37 km)	0	23 mi (37 km)
Battle Creek		Battle Creek	ID	BLM	Mar 30, 2009	23.4 mi (37.7 km)	0	0	23.4 mi (37.7 km)
Bautista Creek		Bautista Creek	CA	USFS	Mar 30, 2009	0	0	9.8 mi (15.8 km)	9.8 mi (15.8 km)
Bear Creek		Bear Creek	MI	USFS	Mar 3, 1992	0	6.5 mi (10.5 km)	0	6.5 mi (10.5 km)
Beaver Creek		Beaver Creek	AK	BLM, USFWS	Dec 2, 1980	127 mi (204 km)	0	0	127 mi (204 km)
Big and Little Darby Creek		Big Darby Creek, Little Darby Creek	OH		Mar 10, 1994	0	85.9 mi (138.2 km)	0	85.9 mi (138.2 km)
Big Jacks Creek		Big Jacks Creek	ID	BLM	Mar 30, 2009	35 mi (56 km)	0	0	35 mi (56 km)
Big Marsh Creek		Big Marsh Creek	OR	USFS	Oct 28, 1988	0	0	15 mi (24 km)	15 mi (24 km)
Big Piney Creek		Big Piney Creek	AR	USFS	Apr 22, 1992	0	45.2 mi (72.7 km)	0	45.2 mi (72.7 km)
Big Sur River		Big Sur River, North Fork Big Sur River, South Fork Big Sur River	CA	USFS	Jun 19, 1992	19.5 mi (31.4 km)	0	0	19.5 mi (31.4 km)
Birch Creek		Birch Creek	AK	BLM	Dec 2, 1980	126 mi (203 km)	0	0	126 mi (203 km)
Black Butte River		Black Butte River, Cold Creek	CA	USFS	Oct 17, 2006	17.5 mi (28.2 km)	3.5 mi (5.6 km)	0	21 mi (34 km)
Black Creek		Black Creek	MS	USFS	Oct 30, 1986	0	21 mi (34 km)	0	21 mi (34 km)
Black River		Black River	MI	USFS	Mar 3, 1992	0	14 mi (23 km)	0	14 mi (23 km)
Bluestone National Scenic River		Bluestone River	WV	NPS	Oct 26, 1988	0	10 mi (16 km)	0	10 mi (16 km)
Bruneau River		Bruneau River	ID	BLM	Mar 30, 2009	38.7 mi (62.3 km)	0	0.6 mi (0.97 km)	39.3 mi (63.2 km)
Bruneau River (West Fork)		West Fork Bruneau River	ID	BLM	Mar 30, 2009	0.4 mi (0.64 km)	0	0	0.4 mi (0.64 km)
Buffalo River		Buffalo River	AR	NPS	Apr 22, 1992	9.4 mi (15.1 km)	6.4 mi (10.3 km)	0	15.8 mi (25.4 km)
Cache la Poudre Wild and Scenic River		Cache la Poudre River, South Fork Cache la Poudre River	CO	NPS, USFS	Oct 30, 1986	30 mi (48 km)	0	46 mi (74 km)	76 mi (122 km)
Carp River		Carp River	MI	USFS	Mar 3, 1992	12.4 mi (20.0 km)	9.3 mi (15.0 km)	6.1 mi (9.8 km)	27.8 mi (44.7 km)
Charley Wild River		Charley River, Copper Creek, Bonanza Creek, Hosford Creek, Derwent Creek, Flat-Orthmer Creek, Crescent Creek, Moraine Creek	AK	NPS	Dec 2, 1980	208 mi (335 km)	0	0	208 mi (335 km)
Chattooga River		Chattooga River, West Fork Chattooga River	GA, NC, SC	USFS	May 10, 1974	41.6 mi (66.9 km)	2.5 mi (4.0 km)	14.6 mi (23.5 km)	58.7 mi (94.5 km)
Chetco River		Chetco River	OR	USFS	Oct 28, 1988	17.5 mi (28.2 km)	7.5 mi (12.1 km)	9.5 mi (15.3 km)	44.5 mi (71.6 km)
Chilikadrotna Wild River		Chilikadrotna River	AK	NPS	Dec 2, 1980	11 mi (18 km)	0	0	11 mi (18 km)
Clackamas River		Clackamas River	OR	USFS	Oct 28, 1988	0	20 mi (32 km)	27 mi (43 km)	47 mi (76 km)
Clackamas River (South Fork)		South Fork Clackamas River	OR	USFS	Mar 30, 2009	4.2 mi (6.8 km)	0	0	4.2 mi (6.8 km)
Clarion River		Clarion River	PA	USFS	Oct 19, 1996	0	17.1 mi (27.5 km)	34.6 mi (55.7 km)	51.7 mi (83.2 km)
Clearwater River (Middle Fork)		Middle Fork Clearwater River, Lochsa River, Selway River	ID	USFS	Oct 2, 1968	54 mi (87 km)	0	131 mi (211 km)	185 mi (298 km)
Collawash River		Collawash River	OR	USFS	Mar 30, 2009	0	11 mi (18 km)	6.8 mi (10.9 km)	17.8 mi (28.6 km)
Cossatot River		Cossatot River, Brushy Creek	AR	USACE, USFS	Apr 22, 1992	0	26.6 mi (42.8 km)	4.2 mi (6.8 km)	30.8 mi (49.6 km)
Cottonwood Creek (California)		Cottonwood Creek	CA	USFS	Mar 30, 2009	17.4 mi (28.0 km)	0	4.1 mi (6.6 km)	21.5 mi (34.6 km)
Cottonwood Creek (Idaho)		Cottonwood Creek	ID	BLM	Mar 30, 2009	2.6 mi (4.2 km)	0	0	2.6 mi (4.2 km)
Crescent Creek		Crescent Creek	OR	USFS	Oct 28, 1988	0	0	10 mi (16 km)	10 mi (16 km)
Crooked River		Crooked River	OR	BLM, USFS	Oct 28, 1988	0	0	14.8 mi (23.8 km)	14.8 mi (23.8 km)
Crooked River (North Fork)		North Fork Crooked River	OR	BLM, USFS	Oct 28, 1988	12.2 mi (19.6 km)	8.2 mi (13.2 km)	13.3 mi (21.4 km)	33.7 mi (54.2 km)
Deep Creek (California)		Deep Creek, Holcomb Creek	CA	USFS	Mar 12, 2019	22.5 mi (36.2 km)	1 mi (1.6 km)	11 mi (18 km)	34.5 mi (55.5 km)
Deep Creek (Idaho)		Deep Creek	ID	BLM	Mar 30, 2009	13.1 mi (21.1 km)	0	0	13.1 mi (21.1 km)
Lower Delaware National Wild and Scenic River		Delaware River, Paunnacussing Creek, Tohickon Creek, Tinicum Creek, Rapp Creek, Beaver Creek	NJ, PA	NPS	Nov 1, 2000	0	25.4 mi (40.9 km)	41.9 mi (67.4 km)	67.3 mi (108.3 km)
Middle Delaware National Scenic River		Delaware River	NJ, PA	NPS	Nov 10, 1978	0	35 mi (56 km)	5 mi (8.0 km)	40 mi (64 km)
Upper Delaware Scenic and Recreational River		Delaware River	NY, PA	NPS	Nov 10, 1978	0	23.1 mi (37.2 km)	50.3 mi (81.0 km)	73.4 mi (118.1 km)
Delta River		Delta River	AK	BLM	Dec 2, 1980	20 mi (32 km)	24 mi (39 km)	18 mi (29 km)	62 mi (100 km)
Deschutes River		Deschutes River	OR	BLM, USFS	Oct 28, 1988	0	31 mi (50 km)	143.4 mi (230.8 km)	174.4 mi (280.7 km)
Dickshooter Creek		Dickshooter Creek	ID	BLM	Mar 30, 2009	9.3 mi (15.0 km)	0	0	9.3 mi (15.0 km)
Donner und Blitzen River		Donner und Blitzen River, Little Blitzen River, South Fork Blitzen River, Indian Creek, Big Indian Creek, Little Indian Creek, Fish Creek, Mud Creek, Ankle Creek, South Ankle Creek, Deep Creek	OR	BLM, USFS	Oct 28, 1988	87.5 mi (140.8 km)	0	0	87.5 mi (140.8 km)
Duncan Creek		Duncan Creek	ID	BLM	Mar 30, 2009	0.9 mi (1.4 km)	0	0	0.9 mi (1.4 km)
Eagle Creek (Mt. Hood National Forest)		Eagle Creek	OR	USFS	Mar 30, 2009	8.3 mi (13.4 km)	0	0	8.3 mi (13.4 km)
Eagle Creek (Wallowa–Whitman National Forest)		Eagle Creek	OR	USFS	Oct 28, 1988	4.5 mi (7.2 km)	6 mi (9.7 km)	18.4 mi (29.6 km)	28.9 mi (46.5 km)
East Rosebud Creek		East Rosebud Creek	MT	USFS	Aug 2, 2018	13 mi (21 km)	0	7 mi (11 km)	20 mi (32 km)
Eel River		Eel River, Middle Fork Eel River, South Fork Eel River, North Fork Eel River, Van Duzen River	CA	BLM, USFS	Jan 19, 1981	97 mi (156 km)	28 mi (45 km)	237 mi (381 km)	398 mi (641 km)
Eightmile National Wild and Scenic River		Eightmile River, East Branch Eightmile River, Harris Brook, Beaver Brook, Falls Brook	CT	NPS	May 8, 2008	0	25.3 mi (40.7 km)	0	25.3 mi (40.7 km)
Eleven Point National Wild and Scenic River		Eleven Point River	MO	USFS	Oct 2, 1968	0	44.4 mi (71.5 km)	0	44.4 mi (71.5 km)
Elk Creek		Elk Creek	OR	BLM	Mar 12, 2019	0	7.3 mi (11.7 km)	0	7.3 mi (11.7 km)
Elk River		Elk River, Bald Mountain Creek, South Fork Bald Mountain Creek, Bear Creek, Blackberry Creek, East Fork Blackberry Creek, Butler Creek, East Fork Butler Creek, Lost Creek, McCurdy Creek, Milbury Creek, Panther Creek, East Fork Panther Creek, West Fork Panther Creek, Platinum Creek, Purple Mountain Creek, Rock Creek	OR	USFS	Oct 28, 1988	39.3 mi (63.2 km)	8.4 mi (13.5 km)	26.5 mi (42.6 km)	74.2 mi (119.4 km)
Elkhorn Creek		Elkhorn Creek	OR	BLM, USFS	Sep 30, 1996	5.8 mi (9.3 km)	0.6 mi (0.97 km)	0	6.4 mi (10.3 km)
Lower Farmington and Salmon Brook Wild and Scenic Rivers		Farmington River, Salmon Brook, East Branch Salmon Brook, West Branch Salmon Brook	CT	NPS	Mar 12, 2019	0	0	61.7 mi (99.3 km)	61.7 mi (99.3 km)
Farmington National Wild and Scenic River		West Branch Farmington River	CT	NPS	Aug 26, 1994	0	0	15.1 mi (24.3 km)	15.1 mi (24.3 km)
Feather River		Feather River	CA	USFS	Oct 2, 1968	32.9 mi (52.9 km)	9.7 mi (15.6 km)	35 mi (56 km)	77.6 mi (124.9 km)
Fifteenmile Creek		Fifteenmile Creek	OR	USFS	Mar 30, 2009	10.5 mi (16.9 km)	0.6 mi (0.97 km)	0	11.1 mi (17.9 km)
Fish Creek		Fish Creek	OR	USFS	Mar 30, 2009	0	0	13.5 mi (21.7 km)	13.5 mi (21.7 km)
Flathead River		Flathead River, North Fork Flathead River, Middle Fork Flathead River, South Fork Flathead River	MT	NPS, USFS	Oct 12, 1976	97.9 mi (157.6 km)	40.7 mi (65.5 km)	80.4 mi (129.4 km)	219 mi (352 km)
Fortymile River		Fortymile River, O'Brien Creek, South Fork Fortymile River, Middle Fork Fortymile River, North Fork Fortymile River, Napoleon Creek, Franklin Creek, Uhler Creek, Walker Fork, Wade Creek, Mosquito Fork, Dennison Fork, West Fork Dennison Fork, Logging Cabin Creek, Hutchison Creek, Champion Creek, Joseph Creek	AK	BLM	Dec 2, 1980	179 mi (288 km)	203 mi (327 km)	10 mi (16 km)	392 mi (631 km)
Fossil Creek		Fossil Creek	AZ	USFS	Mar 30, 2009	9.3 mi (15.0 km)	0	7.5 mi (12.1 km)	16.8 mi (27.0 km)
Franklin Creek		Franklin Creek	OR	USFS	Mar 12, 2019	4.5 mi (7.2 km)	0	0	4.5 mi (7.2 km)
Fuller Mill Creek		Fuller Mill Creek	CA	USFS	Mar 30, 2009	0	2.6 mi (4.2 km)	0.9 mi (1.4 km)	3.5 mi (5.6 km)
Grande Ronde River		Grande Ronde River	OR	BLM, USFS	Oct 28, 1988	26.4 mi (42.5 km)	0	17.4 mi (28.0 km)	43.8 mi (70.5 km)
Great Egg Harbor Scenic and Recreational River		Great Egg Harbor River, Squankum Branch, Big Bridge Branch, Penny Pot Stream Branch, Deep Run, Mare Run, Babcock Creek, Gravelly Run, Miry Run, South River, Stephen Creek, Gibson Creek, English Creek, Lakes Creek, Middle River, Patcong Creek, Tuckahoe River, Cedar Swamp Creek	NJ	NPS	Oct 27, 1992	0	30.6 mi (49.2 km)	98.4 mi (158.4 km)	129 mi (208 km)
Green River		Green River	UT	BLM	Mar 12, 2019	5.3 mi (8.5 km)	49.2 mi (79.2 km)	8.5 mi (13.7 km)	63 mi (101 km)
Gulkana River		Gulkana River, Middle Fork Gulkana River, West Fork Gulkana River, South Branch West Fork Gulkana River, North Branch West Fork Gulkana River	AK	BLM	Dec 2, 1980	181 mi (291 km)	0	0	181 mi (291 km)
Hood River (East Fork)		East Fork Hood River	OR	USFS	Mar 30, 2009	0	0	13.5 mi (21.7 km)	13.5 mi (21.7 km)
Hood River (Middle Fork)		Middle Fork Hood River	OR	USFS	Mar 30, 2009	0	3.7 mi (6.0 km)	0	3.7 mi (6.0 km)
Horsepasture River		Horsepasture River	NC	USFS	Oct 26, 1986	0	3.6 mi (5.8 km)	0.6 mi (0.97 km)	4.2 mi (6.8 km)
Hurricane Creek		Hurricane Creek	AR	USFS	Apr 22, 1992	2.4 mi (3.9 km)	13.1 mi (21.1 km)	0	15.5 mi (24.9 km)
Illabot Creek		Illabot Creek	WA	USFS	Dec 19, 2014	4.3 mi (6.9 km)	0	10 mi (16 km)	14.3 mi (23.0 km)
Illinois River		Illinois River	OR	USFS	Oct 19, 1984	28.7 mi (46.2 km)	17.9 mi (28.8 km)	3.8 mi (6.1 km)	50.4 mi (81.1 km)
Imnaha River		Imnaha River, South Fork Imnaha River	OR	USFS	Oct 28, 1988	15 mi (24 km)	4 mi (6.4 km)	58 mi (93 km)	77 mi (124 km)
Indian River		Indian River	MI	USFS	Mar 3, 1992	0	12 mi (19 km)	39 mi (63 km)	51 mi (82 km)
Ivishak River		Ivishak River, unnamed tributary from Porcupine Lake	AK	USFWS	Dec 2, 1980	80 mi (130 km)	0	0	80 mi (130 km)
Jarbidge River		Jarbidge River	ID	BLM	Mar 30, 2009	28.8 mi (46.3 km)	0	0	28.8 mi (46.3 km)
Jemez River (East Fork)		East Fork Jemez River	NM	USFS	Jun 6, 1990	4 mi (6.4 km)	5 mi (8.0 km)	2 mi (3.2 km)	11 mi (18 km)
Jenny Creek		Jenny Creek	OR	BLM	Mar 12, 2019	0	17.6 mi (28.3 km)	0	17.6 mi (28.3 km)
John Wild River		John River	AK	NPS	Dec 2, 1980	52 mi (84 km)	0	0	52 mi (84 km)
John Day River		John Day River	OR	BLM, USFS	Oct 28, 1988	0	0	147.5 mi (237.4 km)	147.5 mi (237.4 km)
John Day River (North Fork)		North Fork John Day River	OR	USFS	Oct 28, 1988	27.8 mi (44.7 km)	10.5 mi (16.9 km)	15.8 mi (25.4 km)	54.1 mi (87.1 km)
John Day River (South Fork)		South Fork John Day River	OR	BLM	Oct 28, 1988	0	0	47 mi (76 km)	47 mi (76 km)
Joseph Creek		Joseph Creek	OR	USFS	Oct 28, 1988	8.6 mi (13.8 km)	0	0	8.6 mi (13.8 km)
Kern River		North Fork Kern River, South Fork Kern River	CA	NPS, USFS	Nov 24, 1987	123.1 mi (198.1 km)	7 mi (11 km)	20.9 mi (33.6 km)	151 mi (243 km)
Kings River		Kings River, Middle Fork Kings River, South Fork Kings River	CA	USFS	Nov 3, 1987	65.5 mi (105.4 km)	0	15.5 mi (24.9 km)	81 mi (130 km)
Klamath River (California)		Klamath River, Salmon River, North Fork Salmon River, South Fork Salmon River, Scott River, Wooley Creek	CA	BLM, USFS	Jan 19, 1981	11.7 mi (18.8 km)	23.5 mi (37.8 km)	250.8 mi (403.6 km)	286 mi (460 km)
Klamath River (Oregon)		Klamath River	OR	BLM	Sep 22, 1994	0	11 mi (18 km)	0	11 mi (18 km)
Klickitat River		Klickitat River	WA	USFS	Nov 17, 1986	0	0	10.8 mi (17.4 km)	10.8 mi (17.4 km)
Kobuk Wild River		Kobuk River	AK	NPS	Dec 2, 1980	110 mi (180 km)	0	0	110 mi (180 km)
North Fork of the Koyukuk Wild River		North Fork Koyukuk River	AK	NPS	Dec 2, 1980	102 mi (164 km)	0	0	102 mi (164 km)
Lamprey Wild and Scenic River		Lamprey River	NH	NPS	Nov 12, 1996	0	0	23.5 mi (37.8 km)	23.5 mi (37.8 km)
Little Beaver Creek		Little Beaver Creek, North Fork Little Beaver Creek, Middle Fork Little Beaver Creek, West Fork Little Beaver Creek	OH		Oct 23, 1975	0	33 mi (53 km)	0	33 mi (53 km)
Little Deschutes River		Little Deschutes River	OR	USFS	Oct 28, 1988	0	0	12 mi (19 km)	12 mi (19 km)
Little Jacks Creek		Little Jacks Creek	ID	BLM	Mar 30, 2009	12.4 mi (20.0 km)	0	0	12.4 mi (20.0 km)
Little Miami River		Little Miami River, Caesars Creek	OH		Aug 20, 1973	28.7 mi (46.2 km)	18 mi (29 km)	76 mi (122 km)	94 mi (151 km)
Little Missouri River		Little Missouri River	AR	USFS	Apr 22, 1992	4.4 mi (7.1 km)	11.3 mi (18.2 km)	0	15.7 mi (25.3 km)
Lobster Creek		Lobster Creek	OR	BLM	Mar 12, 2019	0	0	5 mi (8.0 km)	5 mi (8.0 km)
Lostine River		Lostine River	OR	USFS	Oct 28, 1988	5 mi (8.0 km)	0	11 mi (18 km)	16 mi (26 km)
Loxahatchee River		Loxahatchee River	FL		May 17, 1985	1.3 mi (2.1 km)	5.8 mi (9.3 km)	0.5 mi (0.80 km)	7.6 mi (12.2 km)
Lumber River		Lumber River	NC		Sep 25, 1998	0	60 mi (97 km)	21 mi (34 km)	81 mi (130 km)
Malheur River		Malheur River	OR	USFS	Oct 28, 1988	6.7 mi (10.8 km)	7 mi (11 km)	0	13.7 mi (22.0 km)
Malheur River (North Fork)		North Fork Malheur River	OR	USFS	Oct 28, 1988	0	25.5 mi (41.0 km)	0	25.5 mi (41.0 km)
Manistee River		Manistee River	MI	USFS	Mar 3, 1992	0	0	26 mi (42 km)	26 mi (42 km)
Maurice Scenic and Recreational River		Maurice River, Menantico Creek, Manumuskin River, Muskee Creek	NJ	NPS	Dec 1, 1993	0	28.9 mi (46.5 km)	6.5 mi (10.5 km)	35.4 mi (57.0 km)
McKenzie River		McKenzie River	OR	USFS	Oct 28, 1988	0	0	12.7 mi (20.4 km)	12.7 mi (20.4 km)
Merced River		Merced River, Red Peak Fork, Merced Peak Fork, Triple Peak Fork, Lyell Fork Merced River, South Fork Merced River	CA	BLM, NPS, USFS	Nov 2, 1987	71 mi (114 km)	16 mi (26 km)	35.5 mi (57.1 km)	122.5 mi (197.1 km)
Metolius River		Metolius River	OR	USFS	Oct 28, 1988	0	17.1 mi (27.5 km)	11.5 mi (18.5 km)	28.6 mi (46.0 km)
Minam River		Minam River	OR	USFS	Oct 28, 1988	41.9 mi (67.4 km)	0	0	41.9 mi (67.4 km)
Missisquoi and Trout National Wild and Scenic River		Missisquoi River, Trout River	VT		Dec 19, 2014	0	0	46.1 mi (74.2 km)	46.1 mi (74.2 km)
Missouri National Recreational River		Missouri River	NE, SD	NPS	Nov 10, 1978	0	0	0	98 mi (158 km)
Upper Missouri River		Missouri River	MT	BLM	Oct 12, 1976	64 mi (103 km)	26 mi (42 km)	59 mi (95 km)	149 mi (240 km)
Molalla River		Molalla River, Table Rock Fork	OR	BLM	Mar 12, 2019	0	0	21.3 mi (34.3 km)	21.3 mi (34.3 km)
Mulberry River		Mulberry River	AR	USFS	Apr 22, 1992	0	19.4 mi (31.2 km)	36.6 mi (58.9 km)	56 mi (90 km)
Mulchatna Wild River		Mulchatna River	AK	NPS	Dec 2, 1980	0	0	24 mi (39 km)	24 mi (39 km)
Musconetcong National Wild and Scenic River		Musconetcong River	NJ		Dec 22, 2006	0	3.5 mi (5.6 km)	25 mi (40 km)	28.5 mi (45.9 km)
Nashua, Squannacook, and Nissitissit Wild and Scenic Rivers		Nashua River, Squannacook River, Nissitissit River	MA, NH	NPS	Mar 12, 2019	0	52.8 mi (85.0 km)	0	52.8 mi (85.0 km)
Nestucca River		Nestucca River	OR	BLM	Mar 12, 2019	0	0	15.5 mi (24.9 km)	15.5 mi (24.9 km)
New River		New River	NC		Apr 13, 1976	0	26.5 mi (42.6 km)	0	26.5 mi (42.6 km)
Niobrara National Scenic River		Niobrara River, Verdigre Creek	NE	NPS, USFWS	May 24, 1991	0	76 mi (122 km)	28 mi (45 km)	104 mi (167 km)
Noatak Wild River		Noatak River	AK	NPS	Dec 2, 1980	330 mi (530 km)	0	0	330 mi (530 km)
North Powder River		North Powder River	OR	USFS	Oct 28, 1988	0	6.4 mi (10.3 km)	0	6.4 mi (10.3 km)
North Sylamore Creek		North Sylamore Creek	AR	USFS	Apr 22, 1992	0	14.5 mi (23.3 km)	0	14.5 mi (23.3 km)
North Umpqua River		North Umpqua River	OR	BLM, USFS	Oct 28, 1988	0	0	33.8 mi (54.4 km)	33.8 mi (54.4 km)
Nowitna River		Nowitna River	AK	USFWS	Dec 2, 1980	225 mi (362 km)	0	0	225 mi (362 km)
Obed Wild and Scenic River		Obed River, Clear Creek, Daddys Creek, Emory River	TN	NPS	Oct 12, 1976	43.3 mi (69.7 km)	0	2 mi (3.2 km)	45.3 mi (72.9 km)
Ontonagon River		East Branch Ontonagon River, Middle Branch Ontonagon River, Cisco Branch Ontonagon River, West Branch Ontonagon River	MI	USFS	Mar 3, 1992	43 mi (69 km)	35 mi (56 km)	92 mi (148 km)	170 mi (270 km)
Owens River Headwaters		Owens River, Deadman Creek, Glass Creek	CA	USFS	Mar 30, 2009	6.3 mi (10.1 km)	6.6 mi (10.6 km)	6.2 mi (10.0 km)	19.1 mi (30.7 km)
Owyhee River (Idaho)		Owyhee River	ID	BLM	Mar 30, 2009	67.3 mi (108.3 km)	0	0	67.3 mi (108.3 km)
Owyhee River (Oregon)		Owyhee River	OR	BLM	Oct 19, 1984	120 mi (190 km)	0	0	120 mi (190 km)
Owyhee River (North Fork) (Idaho)		North Fork Owyhee River	ID	BLM	Mar 30, 2009	15.1 mi (24.3 km)	0	5.7 mi (9.2 km)	20.8 mi (33.5 km)
Owyhee River (North Fork) (Oregon)		North Fork Owyhee River	OR	BLM	Oct 28, 1988	9.6 mi (15.4 km)	0	0	9.6 mi (15.4 km)
Owyhee River (South Fork)		South Fork Owyhee River	ID	BLM	Mar 30, 2009	30.2 mi (48.6 km)	0	1.2 mi (1.9 km)	31.4 mi (50.5 km)
Paint River		Paint River, North Branch Paint River, South Branch Paint River	MI	USFS	Mar 3, 1992	52 mi (84 km)	0	0	52 mi (84 km)
Palm Canyon Creek		Palm Canyon Creek	CA	USFS	Mar 30, 2009	8.1 mi (13.0 km)	0	0	8.1 mi (13.0 km)
Pecos River		Pecos River	NM	USFS	Jun 6, 1990	13.5 mi (21.7 km)	0	7 mi (11 km)	20.5 mi (33.0 km)
Pere Marquette River		Pere Marquette River	MI	USFS	Nov 10, 1978	0	66 mi (106 km)	0	66 mi (106 km)
Pine River		Pine River	MI	USFS	Mar 3, 1992	0	26 mi (42 km)	0	26 mi (42 km)
Piru Creek		Piru Creek	CA	USFS	Mar 30, 2009	4.3 mi (6.9 km)	0	3 mi (4.8 km)	7.3 mi (11.7 km)
Powder River		Powder River	OR	BLM	Oct 28, 1988	0	11.7 mi (18.8 km)	0	11.7 mi (18.8 km)
Pratt River		Pratt River	WA	USFS	Dec 19, 2014	9.5 mi (15.3 km)	0	0	9.5 mi (15.3 km)
Presque Isle River		Presque Isle River, East Branch Presque Isle River, South Branch Presque Isle River, West Branch Presque Isle River	MI	USFS	Mar 3, 1992	0	24 mi (39 km)	48 mi (77 km)	72 mi (116 km)
Quartzville Creek		Quartzville Creek	OR	BLM	Oct 28, 1988	0	0	12 mi (19 km)	12 mi (19 km)
Rapid River		Rapid River, West Fork Rapid River	ID	USFS	Dec 31, 1975	26.8 mi (43.1 km)	0	0	26.8 mi (43.1 km)
Red Canyon		Red Canyon	ID	BLM	Mar 30, 2009	4.6 mi (7.4 km)	0	0	4.6 mi (7.4 km)
Red River		Red River	KY	USFS	Dec 2, 1993	9.1 mi (14.6 km)	0	10.3 mi (16.6 km)	19.4 mi (31.2 km)
Richland Creek		Richland Creek	AR	USFS	Apr 22, 1992	5.3 mi (8.5 km)	11.2 mi (18.0 km)	0	16.5 mi (26.6 km)
Rio Chama		Rio Chama	NM	BLM, USFS	Nov 7, 1988	21.6 mi (34.8 km)	3 mi (4.8 km)	0	24.6 mi (39.6 km)
Rio de la Mina		Rio de la Mina	PR	USFS	Dec 19, 2002	0	1.2 mi (1.9 km)	0.9 mi (1.4 km)	2.1 mi (3.4 km)
Rio Grande Wild and Scenic River		Rio Grande	TX	NPS	Nov 10, 1978	95.2 mi (153.2 km)	96 mi (154 km)	0	191.2 mi (307.7 km)
Rio Grande del Norte		Rio Grande, Red River	NM	BLM, USFS	Oct 2, 1968	54.9 mi (88.4 km)	12.5 mi (20.1 km)	0.8 mi (1.3 km)	68.2 mi (109.8 km)
Rio Icacos		Rio Icacos	PR	USFS	Dec 19, 2002	0	2.3 mi (3.7 km)	0	2.3 mi (3.7 km)
Rio Mameyes		Rio Mameyes	PR	USFS	Dec 19, 2002	2.1 mi (3.4 km)	1.4 mi (2.3 km)	1 mi (1.6 km)	4.5 mi (7.2 km)
River Styx Wild and Scenic River		River Styx (subterranean portion of Cave Creek)	OR	NPS	Dec 19, 2014	0	0.4 mi (0.64 km)	0	0.4 mi (0.64 km)
Roaring River		Roaring River	OR	USFS	Oct 28, 1988	13.5 mi (21.7 km)	0	0.2 mi (0.32 km)	13.7 mi (22.0 km)
Roaring River (South Fork)		South Fork Roaring River	OR	USFS	Mar 30, 2009	4.6 mi (7.4 km)	0	0	4.6 mi (7.4 km)
Rogue River		Rogue River, Alder Creek, Anna Creek, Bailey Creek, Big Windy Creek, East Fork Big Windy Creek, Booze Creek, Bronco Creek, Bunker Creek, Copsey Creek, Cowley Creek, Ditch Creek, Dulog Creek, Francis Creek, Hewitt Creek, Howard Creek, Jenny Creek, Kelsey Creek, East Fork Kelsey Creek, Little Windy Creek, Long Gulch, Meadow Creek, Missouri Creek, Montgomery Creek, Mule Creek, Quail Creek, Rum Creek, East Fork Rum Creek, Russian Creek, Shady Creek, Slide Creek, Whisky Creek, East Fork Whisky Creek, West Fork Whisky Creek, Wildcat Creek	OR	BLM, USFS	Oct 2, 1968	125 mi (201 km)	33.2 mi (53.4 km)	45.3 mi (72.9 km)	203.5 mi (327.5 km)
Rogue River (Upper)		Rogue River	OR	USFS	Oct 28, 1988	6.1 mi (9.8 km)	34.2 mi (55.0 km)	0	40.3 mi (64.9 km)
Saint Croix National Scenic Riverway		St. Croix River, Namekagon River	MN, WI	NPS	Oct 2, 1968	0	191 mi (307 km)	59 mi (95 km)	252 mi (406 km)
Saint Joe River		Saint Joe River	ID	USFS	Nov 10, 1978	26.6 mi (42.8 km)	0	39.7 mi (63.9 km)	66.3 mi (106.7 km)
Saline Bayou		Saline Bayou	LA	USFS	Oct 30, 1986	0	19 mi (31 km)	0	19 mi (31 km)
Salmon Wild River		Salmon River	AK	NPS	Dec 2, 1980	70 mi (110 km)	0	0	70 mi (110 km)
Salmon River (Idaho)		Salmon River	ID	USFS	Jul 23, 1980	79 mi (127 km)	0	46 mi (74 km)	125 mi (201 km)
Salmon River (Middle Fork)		Middle Fork Salmon River	ID	USFS	Oct 2, 1968	103 mi (166 km)	1 mi (1.6 km)	0	104 mi (167 km)
Salmon River (Oregon)		Salmon River	OR	BLM, USFS	Oct 28, 1988	15 mi (24 km)	4.8 mi (7.7 km)	13.7 mi (22.0 km)	33.5 mi (53.9 km)
Sandy River		Sandy River	OR	BLM, USFS	Oct 28, 1988	4.5 mi (7.2 km)	3.8 mi (6.1 km)	16.6 mi (26.7 km)	24.9 mi (40.1 km)
San Jacinto River (North Fork)		North Fork San Jacinto River	CA	USFS	Mar 30, 2009	7.2 mi (11.6 km)	2.3 mi (3.7 km)	0.7 mi (1.1 km)	10.2 mi (16.4 km)
Selawik River		Selawik River	AK	USFWS	Dec 2, 1980	160 mi (260 km)	0	0	160 mi (260 km)
Sespe Creek		Sespe Creek	CA	USFS	Jun 19, 1992	27.5 mi (44.3 km)	4 mi (6.4 km)	0	31.5 mi (50.7 km)
Sheenjek River		Sheenjek River	AK	USFWS	Dec 2, 1980	160 mi (260 km)	0	0	160 mi (260 km)
Sheep Creek		Sheep Creek	ID	BLM	Mar 30, 2009	25.6 mi (41.2 km)	0	0	25.6 mi (41.2 km)
Silver Creek (North Fork)		North Fork Silver Creek	OR	BLM	Mar 30, 2009	0	0	6 mi (9.7 km)	6 mi (9.7 km)
Sisquoc River		Sisquoc River	CA	USFS	Jun 19, 1992	33 mi (53 km)	0	0	33 mi (53 km)
Skagit River		Skagit River, Cascade River, North Fork Cascade River, South Fork Cascade River, Suiattle River, Sauk River, North Fork Sauk River	WA	USFS	Nov 10, 1978	0	100 mi (160 km)	58.5 mi (94.1 km)	158.5 mi (255.1 km)
Smith River		Smith River, North Fork Smith River, Middle Fork Smith River, Siskiyou Fork Smith River, South Siskyou Fork Smith River, South Fork Smith River, Rowdy Creek, Mill Creek, West Branch Mill Creek, East Fork Mill Creek, Little Mill Creek, Bummer Lake Creek, Dominie Creek, Savoy Creek, Myrtle Creek, Shelly Creek, Kelly Creek, Packsaddle Creek, Patrick Creek, East Fork Patrick Creek, West Fork Patrick Creek, Jones Creek, Little Jones Creek, Griffin Creek, Knopki Creek, Monkey Creek, Hardscrabble Creek, Williams Creek, Eightmile Creek, Harrington Creek, Prescott Fork, Quartz Creek, Hurdygurdy Creek, Gordon Creek, Coon Creek, Craigs Creek, Goose Creek, East Fork Goose Creek, Buck Creek, Muzzleloader Creek, Canthook Creek, Rock Creek, Blackhawk Creek, Diamond Creek, North Fork Diamond Creek, Bear Creek, Still Creek, High Plateau Creek, Stony Creek, Peridotite Creek	CA	USFS	Jan 19, 1981	78 mi (126 km)	31 mi (50 km)	216.4 mi (348.3 km)	325.4 mi (523.7 km)
Smith River (North Fork)		North Fork Smith River	OR	USFS	Oct 28, 1988	8.5 mi (13.7 km)	4.5 mi (7.2 km)	0	13 mi (21 km)
Snake River		Snake River	ID, OR	USFS	Dec 1, 1975	32.5 mi (52.3 km)	34.4 mi (55.4 km)	0	66.9 mi (107.7 km)
Snake River Headwaters Wild and Scenic River		Snake River, Bailey Creek, Blackrock Creek, Buffalo Fork Snake River, North Buffalo Fork, Soda Fork, South Buffalo Fork, Crystal Creek, Granite Creek, Gros Ventre River, Hoback River, Lewis River, Pacific Creek, Shoal Creek, Willow Creek, Wolf Creek	WY	NPS	Mar 30, 2009	229.7 mi (369.7 km)	150.4 mi (242.0 km)	33.8 mi (54.4 km)	413.5 mi (665.5 km)
Snoqualmie River (Middle Fork)		Middle Fork Snoqualmie River	WA	USFS	Dec 19, 2014	6.4 mi (10.3 km)	21 mi (34 km)	0	27.4 mi (44.1 km)
Sprague River (North Fork)		North Fork Sprague River	OR	USFS	Oct 28, 1988	0	15 mi (24 km)	0	15 mi (24 km)
Spring Creek		Spring Creek	OR	BLM	Mar 12, 2019	0	1.1 mi (1.8 km)	0	1.1 mi (1.8 km)
Sturgeon River (Hiawatha National Forest)		Sturgeon River	MI	USFS	Mar 3, 1992	0	21.7 mi (34.9 km)	22.2 mi (35.7 km)	43.9 mi (70.7 km)
Sturgeon River (Ottawa National Forest)		Sturgeon River	MI	USFS	Mar 3, 1992	20 mi (32 km)	8 mi (13 km)	0	28 mi (45 km)
Sudbury, Assabet, and Concord National Wild and Scenic Rivers		Sudbury River, Assabet River, Concord River	MA	NPS	Apr 9, 1999	0	14.9 mi (24.0 km)	14.1 mi (22.7 km)	29 mi (47 km)
Surprise Canyon Creek Wild and Scenic River		Surprise Canyon Creek	CA	BLM, NPS	Mar 12, 2019	5.3 mi (8.5 km)	0	1.8 mi (2.9 km)	7.1 mi (11.4 km)
Sycan River		Sycan River	OR	USFS	Oct 28, 1988	0	50.4 mi (81.1 km)	8.6 mi (13.8 km)	59 mi (95 km)
Tahquamenon River (East Branch)		East Branch Tahquamenon River	MI	USFS	Mar 3, 1992	0	3.2 mi (5.1 km)	10 mi (16 km)	13.2 mi (21.2 km)
Taunton Wild and Scenic River		Taunton River	MA	NPS	Mar 30, 2009	0	26 mi (42 km)	14 mi (23 km)	40 mi (64 km)
Tinayguk Wild River		Tinayguk River	AK	NPS	Dec 2, 1980	44 mi (71 km)	0	0	44 mi (71 km)
Tlikakila Wild River		Tlikakila River	AK	NPS	Dec 2, 1980	51 mi (82 km)	0	0	51 mi (82 km)
Trinity River		Trinity River, North Fork Trinity River, South Fork Trinity River, New River	CA	BLM, USFS	Jan 19, 1981	44 mi (71 km)	39 mi (63 km)	120 mi (190 km)	203 mi (327 km)
Tuolumne River		Tuolumne River	CA	BLM, NPS, USFS	Sep 28, 1984	47 mi (76 km)	23 mi (37 km)	13 mi (21 km)	83 mi (134 km)
Unalakleet River		Unalakleet River	AK	BLM	Dec 2, 1980	80 mi (130 km)	0	0	80 mi (130 km)
Verde River		Verde River	AZ	USFS	Aug 28, 1984	22.2 mi (35.7 km)	18.3 mi (29.5 km)	0	40.5 mi (65.2 km)
Vermilion River (Middle Fork)		Middle Fork Vermilion River	IL		May 11, 1989	0	17.1 mi (27.5 km)	0	17.1 mi (27.5 km)
Virgin Wild and Scenic River		North Fork Virgin River, East Fork Virgin River, LaVerkin Creek, North Creek, Left Fork North Creek, Right Fork North Creek, Taylor Creek, North Fork Taylor Creek, Middle Fork Taylor Creek, South Fork Taylor Creek, Timber Creek, Willis Creek, Beartrap Canyon, Hop Valley Creek, Current Creek, Cane Creek, Smith Creek, Wildcat Canyon (Blue Creek), Little Creek, Russell Gulch, Grapevine Wash, Pine Spring Wash, Wolf Springs Wash, Kolob Creek, Oak Creek, Goose Creek, Deep Creek, Imlay Canyon, Orderville Canyon, Mystery Canyon, Echo Canyon, Behunin Canyon, Heaps Canyon, Birch Creek, Oak Creek, Clear Creek, Pine Creek, Shunes Creek	UT	NPS	Mar 30, 2009	145.4 mi (234.0 km)	11.3 mi (18.2 km)	12.6 mi (20.3 km)	169.3 mi (272.5 km)
Walker Creek		Walker Creek	OR	BLM	Mar 12, 2019	0	0	2.9 mi (4.7 km)	2.9 mi (4.7 km)
Wallowa River		Wallowa River	OR	BLM	Jul 23, 1996	0	0	10 mi (16 km)	10 mi (16 km)
Wasson Creek		Wasson Creek	OR	BLM, USFS	Mar 12, 2019	10.1 mi (16.3 km)	0	0	10.1 mi (16.3 km)
Wekiva Wild and Scenic River		Wekiva River, Rock Springs Run, Black Water Creek	FL	NPS	Oct 13, 2000	31.4 mi (50.5 km)	2.1 mi (3.4 km)	8.1 mi (13.0 km)	41.6 mi (66.9 km)
Wenaha River		Wenaha River	OR	USFS	Oct 28, 1988	18.7 mi (30.1 km)	2.7 mi (4.3 km)	0.2 mi (0.32 km)	21.6 mi (34.8 km)
West Fork River (Sipsey Fork)		Sipsey Fork of the Black Warrior River, Hubbard Creek, Thompson Creek, Tedford Creek, Mattox Creek, Borden Creek, Montgomery Creek, Flannigan Creek, Braziel Creek, Hogood Creek	AL	USFS	Oct 28, 1988	36.4 mi (58.6 km)	25 mi (40 km)	0	61.4 mi (98.8 km)
West Little Owyhee River		West Little Owyhee River	OR	BLM	Oct 28, 1988	57.6 mi (92.7 km)	0	0	57.6 mi (92.7 km)
Westfield Wild and Scenic River		Westfield River, West Branch Westfield River, Middle Branch Westfield River, East Branch Westfield River, Drowned Land Brook, Center Brook, Windsor Jambs Brook, Shaker Mill Brook, Depot Brook, Savery Brook, Watson Brook, Center Pond Brook	MA	NPS	Nov 2, 1993	2.6 mi (4.2 km)	42.9 mi (69.0 km)	32.6 mi (52.5 km)	78.1 mi (125.7 km)
White River		White River	OR	BLM, USFS	Oct 28, 1988	0	24.3 mi (39.1 km)	22.5 mi (36.2 km)	46.8 mi (75.3 km)
White Clay Creek Wild and Scenic River		White Clay Creek, East Branch White Clay Creek, Middle Branch White Clay Creek, West Branch White Clay Creek, Middle Run, Pike Creek, Mill Creek, Walnut Run, Broad Run, Egypt Run, Lamborn Run, numerous tributaries	DE, PA	NPS	Oct 24, 2000	0	25.6 mi (41.2 km)	173.4 mi (279.1 km)	199 mi (320 km)
White Salmon River		White Salmon River, Cascade Creek	WA	USFS	Nov 17, 1986	6.7 mi (10.8 km)	21 mi (34 km)	0	27.7 mi (44.6 km)
Whitefish River		Whitefish River, East Branch Whitefish River, West Branch Whitefish River	MI	USFS	Mar 3, 1992	0	31.5 mi (50.7 km)	2.1 mi (3.4 km)	33.6 mi (54.1 km)
Whitewater River		Whitewater River, North Fork Whitewater River, Middle Fork Whitewater River, South Fork Whitewater River	CA	BLM, USFS	Mar 12, 2019	23.5 mi (37.8 km)	0	4.6 mi (7.4 km)	28.1 mi (45.2 km)
Whychus Creek		Whychus Creek, North Fork Whychus Creek, South Fork Whychus Creek, Soap Creek, Park Creek, West Fork Park Creek, East Fork Park Creek, various unnamed tributaries	OR	USFS	Oct 28, 1988	38.6 mi (62.1 km)	8.8 mi (14.2 km)	0	54 mi (87 km)
Wickahoney Creek		Wickahoney Creek	ID	BLM	Mar 30, 2009	1.5 mi (2.4 km)	0	0	1.5 mi (2.4 km)
Wildcat Brook		Wildcat Brook, Little Wildcat Brook, Bog Brook, Great Brook	NH	USFS	Oct 28, 1988	0	13.7 mi (22.0 km)	0.8 mi (1.3 km)	14.5 mi (23.3 km)
Wildhorse & Kiger Creeks		Wildhorse Creek, Kiger Creek, Little Wildhorse Creek	OR	BLM	Oct 30, 2000	13.9 mi (22.4 km)	0	0	13.9 mi (22.4 km)
Willamette River (North Fork Middle Fork)		North Fork Middle Fork Willamette River	OR	USFS	Oct 28, 1988	8.8 mi (14.2 km)	6.5 mi (10.5 km)	27 mi (43 km)	42.3 mi (68.1 km)
Wilson Creek		Wilson Creek	NC	USFS	Aug 18, 2000	4.6 mi (7.4 km)	2.9 mi (4.7 km)	15.8 mi (25.4 km)	23.3 mi (37.5 km)
Wind River		Wind River, unnamed tributary	AK	USFWS	Dec 2, 1980	140 mi (230 km)	0	0	140 mi (230 km)
Wolf River		Wolf River	WI		Oct 2, 1968	0	24 mi (39 km)	0	24 mi (39 km)
Wood–Pawtucket Watershed Wild and Scenic Rivers		Wood River, Pawcatuck River, Ashaway River, Beaver River, Chipuxet River, Green River, Queen River, Shunock River, Usquepaugh River	CT, RI	NPS	Mar 12, 2019	24 mi (39 km)	52 mi (84 km)	34 mi (55 km)	110 mi (180 km)
Yellow Dog River		Yellow Dog River	MI	USFS	Mar 3, 1992	4 mi (6.4 km)	0	0	4 mi (6.4 km)
Yellowstone River (Clarks Fork)		Clarks Fork Yellowstone River	WY	USFS	Nov 28, 1990	20.5 mi (33.0 km)	0	0	20.5 mi (33.0 km)
York River		York River, Bass Cove Creek, Cider Hill Creek, Cutts Ridge Brook, Dolly Gordon Brook, Libby Brook, Rogers Brook, Smelt Brook	ME	NPS	Dec 29, 2022	0	0	30.8 mi (49.6 km)	30.8 mi (49.6 km)
Zigzag River		Zigzag River	OR	USFS	Mar 30, 2009	4.3 mi (6.9 km)	0	0	4.3 mi (6.9 km)
Total					6,507.4 mi (10,472.6 km)	2,969.6 mi (4,779.1 km)	3,843.0 mi (6,184.7 km)	13,443.5 mi (21,635.2 km)	
