= Mount Mitchell (disambiguation) =

Mount Mitchell in North Carolina, United States, is the highest peak of the Appalachian Mountains.

Mount Mitchell may also refer to:

== Landforms ==
- Mount Mitchell (Antarctica)
- Mount Mitchell (Queensland), Australia
- Mitchell Hill, above Henry River (New South Wales), Australia
- Mount Mitchell (Alberta), in Jasper National Park of Canada
- Mount Mitchell (British Columbia) on Vancouver Island, Canada
- Mount Mitchell (Oregon), United States
- Mount Mitchell (Washington), United States

== Other uses ==
- NOAAS Mount Mitchell (S 222), an American survey ship

== See also ==
- Mount Mitchill, Monmouth County, New Jersey, United States
- Mitchell Peak (disambiguation)
- Mount Mitchell State Park, North Carolina, United States
