= South Fork Roaring River =

- Location of the mouth of the South Fork Roaring River in Oregon

Location
- Country: United States
- State: Oregon
- County: Clackamas County

Physical characteristics
- Source: Rock Lakes
  - location: Mount Hood National Forest, Cascade Range
  - coordinates: 45°08′50″N 121°58′52″W
  - elevation: 4,373 ft (1,333 m)
- Mouth: Roaring River
  - coordinates: 45°11′01″N 122°03′08″W
  - elevation: 1,732 ft (528 m)
- Length: 4.6 mi (7.4 km)

National Wild and Scenic River
- Type: Wild
- Designated: March 30, 2009

The South Fork Roaring River is a 4.6-mile (7.4 km) tributary of the Roaring River in Clackamas County in the U.S. state of Oregon. Beginning at Rock Lakes in the Mount Hood National Forest in the Cascade Range, it flows generally northwest along the base of Indian Ridge to meet the main stem. The South Fork has no named tributaries.

In 2009, the entire river was added to the National Wild and Scenic Rivers System. Designated "wild", its watershed includes old-growth forest, a deeply incised canyon, and many cascades, and provides prime habitat for northern spotted owls.

The watershed is part of the Roaring River Wilderness, a 36,500-acre (14,800 ha) federally protected area also established in 2009. The area is off-limits to commercial logging and mechanized recreation though still open to fishing, camping, hunting, hiking, and many other activities.

== See also ==
- List of National Wild and Scenic Rivers
- List of rivers of Oregon
