= Tinicum =

Tinicum may refer to:

- Tinicum Township, Bucks County, Pennsylvania
- Tinicum Township, Delaware County, Pennsylvania
- Tinicum Creek

== See also ==
- John Heinz National Wildlife Refuge at Tinicum
