= Tumblebug Complex Fire =

Wildfire

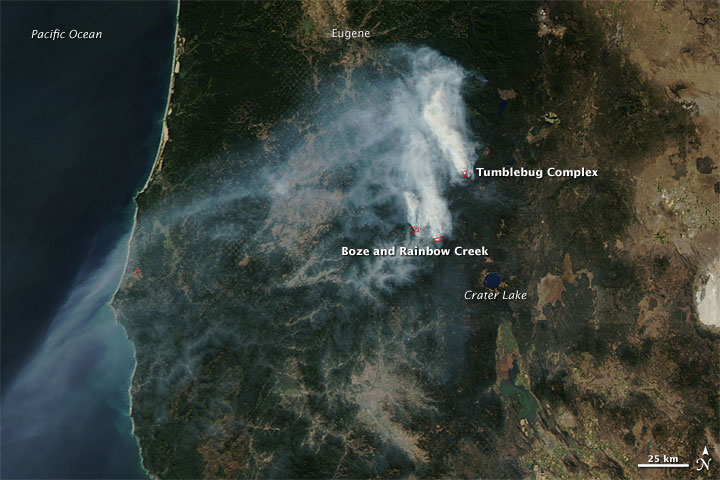
- Date: September 12, 2009 – October 2009
- Location: Willamette National Forest, Oregon
- Coordinates: 43.432°N 122.241°W

Statistics
- Burned area: 14,560 acres (59 km^{2})
- Land use: National Forest

Impacts
- Injuries: 2

Ignition
- Cause: Lightning

Map
- Location within Oregon

The Tumblebug Complex Fire burned 14,570 acres (5,900 ha) of Willamette National Forest land in Lane County, Oregon, United States, from September 12, 2009 to October 2009. The fire was located about 23 miles (37 km) southeast of Oakridge, Oregon, and roughly 5 miles (8.0 km) southwest of Crescent Lake.

== Growth and containment ==
Fed by wind gusts of up to 35 miles per hour (56 km/h) and extremely dry conditions, 25 small fires caused by lightning strikes grew and spread quickly, combining to form larger fires. Firefighters had difficulty fighting them due to the remote location and the rugged terrain, such as basalt cliffs. The fires primarily burned trees ranging from 10 to 45 years old.

By September 16, the fires had combined into three fires that were about 30 acres (12 ha) each in size. At that time, there were already 255 firefighters working to control the fires and the Willamette National Forest was forced to close several United States Forest Service roads.

Nearly 600 firefighters were working to contain the fire by September 21, as the air became drier. Two days later, on September 23, the Lane Regional Air Protection Agency rated the air quality in the "unhealthy" category for Eugene, and reported that the air quality was better in Oakridge. NASA satellite images showed that the smoke was being blown into British Columbia.

The fire grew in size to 7,700 acres (3,100 ha) by September 24, and had burned 9,228 acres (3,734 ha) by September 25. The wind blew the smoke to the north, and created a hazy sky in Bend.

Firefighters had contained five percent of the fire by September 26, although it had spread to about 10,500 acres (4,200 ha). The fire continued growing, spreading to 11,100 acres (4,500 ha) by September 27. The 1,275 firefighters then working to put out the fire had it 12 percent contained, but predicted that it would continue burning until mid-October. Two firefighters were injured as well.

By September 28, the fire had spread to 12,000 acres (4,900 ha) and was 18 percent contained. While wetter and cooler weather was forecasted, the fire continued to expand. It was finally brought under control in October after burning a total of 14,570 acres (5,900 ha).

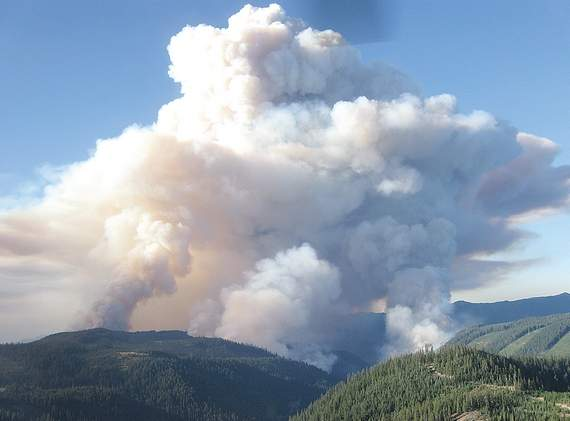
Smoke rising from the fire
