= Lower Delaware National Wild and Scenic River =

Section of river in Pennsylvania and New Jersey

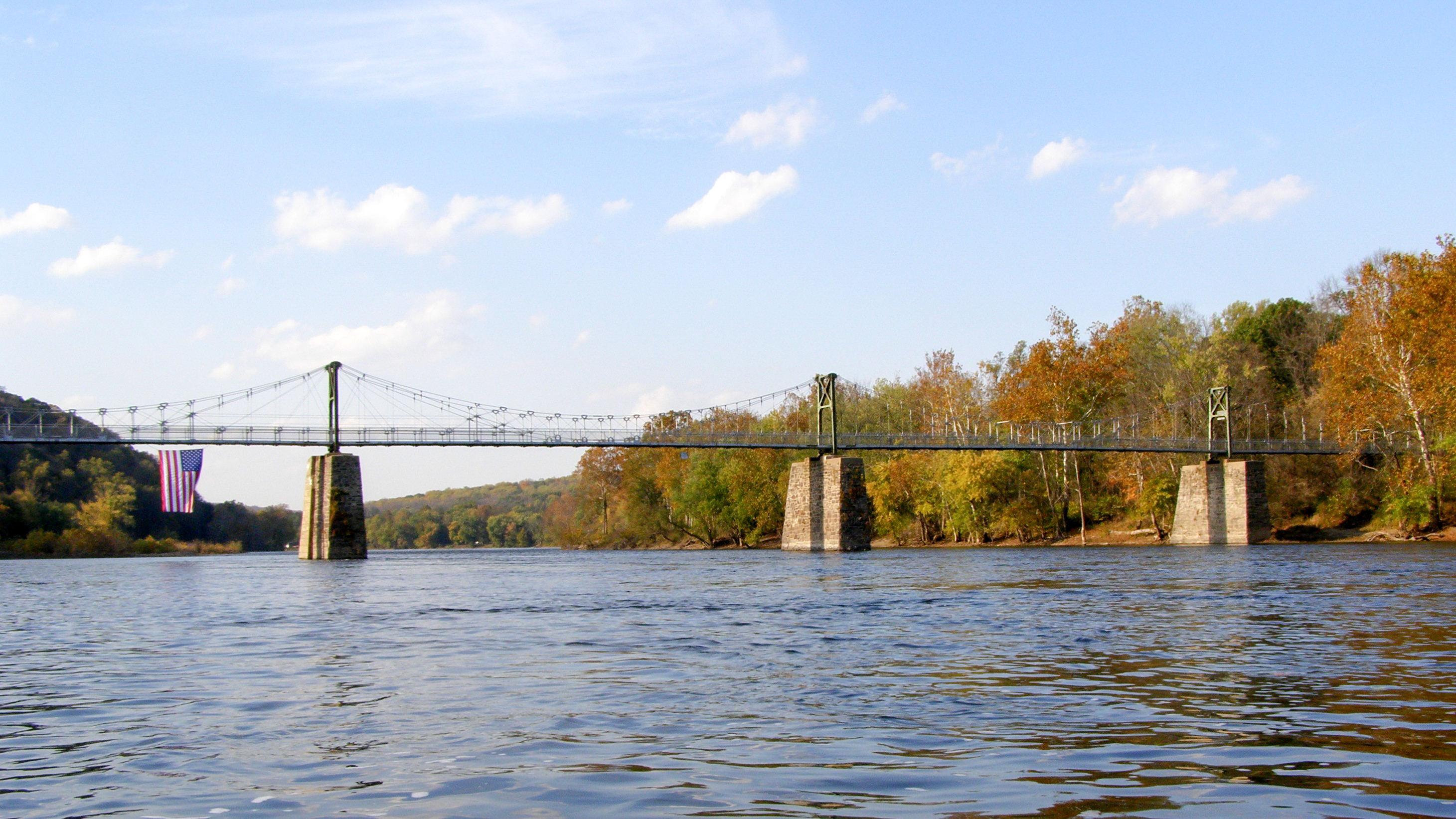
- The Lumberville–Raven Rock Bridge, located within the designated stretch of river

- Location within Pennsylvania Location within the United States
- Location: Pennsylvania & New Jersey, United States
- Coordinates: 40.5029°N 75.0650°W
- Designation: National Wild and Scenic River
- Established: November 1, 2000
- Governing body: National Park Service
- Website: Lower Delaware Scenic and Recreational River

The Lower Delaware National Wild and Scenic River is a federally designated area of the Delaware River protected under the National Wild and Scenic Rivers System in Pennsylvania and New Jersey. The designation also includes sections of Paunnacussing Creek, Tohickon Creek, Tinicum Creek, Rapp Creek, and Beaver Creek. In total, the protection covers 67.3 miles (108.3 km) miles of waterways.

Unlike the Upper Delaware and Middle Delaware scenic rivers, the Lower Delaware is not an official unit of the National Park System. The area is held by a patchwork of state, local, and private landowners, and is overseen cooperatively by the National Park Service and a number of partners including the Delaware River Greenway Partnership. Federal law protects National Wild and Scenic Rivers from significant development, preserving their free-flowing state.

The designated river segments fall within Northampton County and Bucks County in Pennsylvania and Warren County, Hunterdon County, and Mercer County in New Jersey.

== History ==
In 1992, government and regional stakeholders formed the Lower Delaware Wild & Scenic River Management Committee. This organization completed the Lower Delaware Wild & Scenic River Management Plan in August 1997. The plan's six management goals are maintaining water quality, preserving natural resources, protecting historic sites, encouraging responsible recreation, minimizing adverse development, and preserving open space.

Congress designated the scenic river with the passing of the Lower Delaware Wild and Scenic Rivers Act on November 1, 2000.

From 2002 to 2014, $1,125,277 in federal funding was awarded to over 50 partners who completed more than 60 projects related to enhancing the Lower Delaware.

In April 2016, stakeholders formed the Lower Delaware National Wild and Scenic Management Council to continue monitoring the implementation of the River Management Plan.

== Boundary ==
The portion of the Lower Delaware National Wild and Scenic River located on the Delaware River is defined in four segments. The first and northernmost starts at river mile 193.8 and ends at the northern border of Easton, Pennsylvania. The second starts south of the Gilbert Generating Station in Holland Township, New Jersey, and ends north of the intake for the pumping station in Point Pleasant, Pennsylvania. The third starts south of the pumping station and ends 1,000 feet (300 m) north of the New Hope–Lambertville Toll Bridge carrying U.S. Route 202. The fourth and southernmost starts 1,750 feet (530 m) south of the bridge and ends at Washington Crossing, Pennsylvania.

The designation also includes the portion of Paunnacussing Creek within Solebury Township, Pennsylvania; Tohickon Creek below Lake Nockamixon Dam; and all of Tinicum Creek including its main branches Rapp Creek and Beaver Creek.

A total of 67.3 miles (108.3 km) of waterways are protected: 25.4 miles (40.9 km) are classified as "Scenic" while 41.9 miles (67.4 km) are "Recreational". No river miles are classified as "Wild", despite the name "Lower Delaware National Wild and Scenic River". Classification indicates the level of development along a waterway but does not affect the level of protection.
