= East Rosebud Creek =

Creek in Carbon County, Montana, U.S.

Location
- Country: United States
- State: Montana
- County: Carbon County

Physical characteristics
- Source: Fossil Lake
  - coordinates: 45°05′46″N 109°46′47″W
- Mouth: Rosebud Creek
  - coordinates: 45°29′02″N 109°27′25″W

National Wild and Scenic Rivers System
- Type: Wild, Recreational
- Designated: August 2, 2018

East Rosebud Creek is a creek in the U.S. state of Montana. It flows from Fossil Lake in the Custer Gallatin National Forest to Rosebud Creek. Twenty miles (32 km) of the creek are protected under the National Wild and Scenic Rivers System. It is considered a Class V river for recreational purposes and there are a multitude of recreational facilities such as campgrounds and hiking trails along the creek.

== National Wild and Scenic River ==
In 2018, the East Rosebud Wild and Scenic Rivers Act protected the 20 miles (32 km) of East Rosebud Creek within the Custer Gallatin National Forest with 13 miles (21 km) designated as wild and seven designated as recreational. The creek is managed by the U.S. forest service.

== See also ==
- List of rivers of Montana
- List of National Wild and Scenic Rivers
