= Little Deschutes River =

- Location of the mouth of the Little Deschutes River in Oregon
- Etymology: From Riviere des Chutes, used by early 19th-century fur traders

Location
- Country: United States
- State: Oregon
- County: Klamath and Deschutes

Physical characteristics
- Source: Cascade Range
  - location: Mule Mountain, Klamath County
  - coordinates: 43°18′25″N 121°59′43″W
  - elevation: 6,219 ft (1,896 m)
- Mouth: Deschutes River
  - location: near Sunriver, Deschutes County
  - coordinates: 43°51′14″N 121°27′14″W
  - elevation: 4,163 ft (1,269 m)
- Length: 105 mi (169 km)
- Basin size: 1,020 sq mi (2,600 km^{2})
- Discharge
  - average: 201 cu ft/s (5.7 m^{3}/s)

National Wild and Scenic River
- Type: Recreational
- Designated: October 28, 1988

The Little Deschutes River is a tributary of the Deschutes River in the central part of the U.S. state of Oregon. It is about 105 miles (169 km) long, with a drainage basin of 1,020 square miles (2,600 km^{2}). It drains a rural area on the east side of the Cascade Range south of Bend. The Little Deschutes and two other streams in its basin are listed as parts of the National Wild and Scenic Rivers System.

== Course ==
The Little Deschutes River rises near Mule Peak in the high Cascades in the Mount Thielsen Wilderness in northwestern Klamath County, approximately 20 miles (32 km) north of Crater Lake. It flows generally north from the mountains through the Deschutes National Forest, roughly following U.S. Highway 97 past La Pine. It joins the Deschutes from the south approximately 20 miles (32 km) south of Bend in southern Deschutes County.

It passes through the small towns of Crescent and Gilchrist and joins with the Deschutes at Sunriver. The stream meanders significantly most of its course, though this is less pronounced above river mile 80 (river kilometer 130), which is near its crossing of Oregon Route 58.

== "Wild and Scenic" designation ==
In 1988, the upper 12 miles (19 km) of the river was designated part of the National Wild and Scenic Rivers System. The river's canyon and outwash plain contain eroding deposits of pumice and ash from the eruption of Mount Mazama about 7,000 years ago. Two other streams in the Little Deschutes drainage basin are also part of the system. A 10-mile (16 km) stretch of Crescent Creek, all 15 miles (24 km) of Big Marsh Creek, and the canyon section of the Little Deschutes have all been designated "recreational".

== See also ==
- List of longest streams of Oregon
- List of National Wild and Scenic Rivers
- List of rivers of Oregon
