= Mitchell Peak =

Mitchell Peak may refer to:

- Mitchell Peak (Antarctica), a mountain in Antarctica.
- Mitchell Peak (Wyoming), a mountain in the Wind River Range, Wyoming, USA

== See also ==
- Mount Mitchell (disambiguation)
