= Dickshooter =

Unincorporated community in the state of Idaho, United States

Coordinates: 42°23′30″N 116°30′06″W

Dickshooter Creek
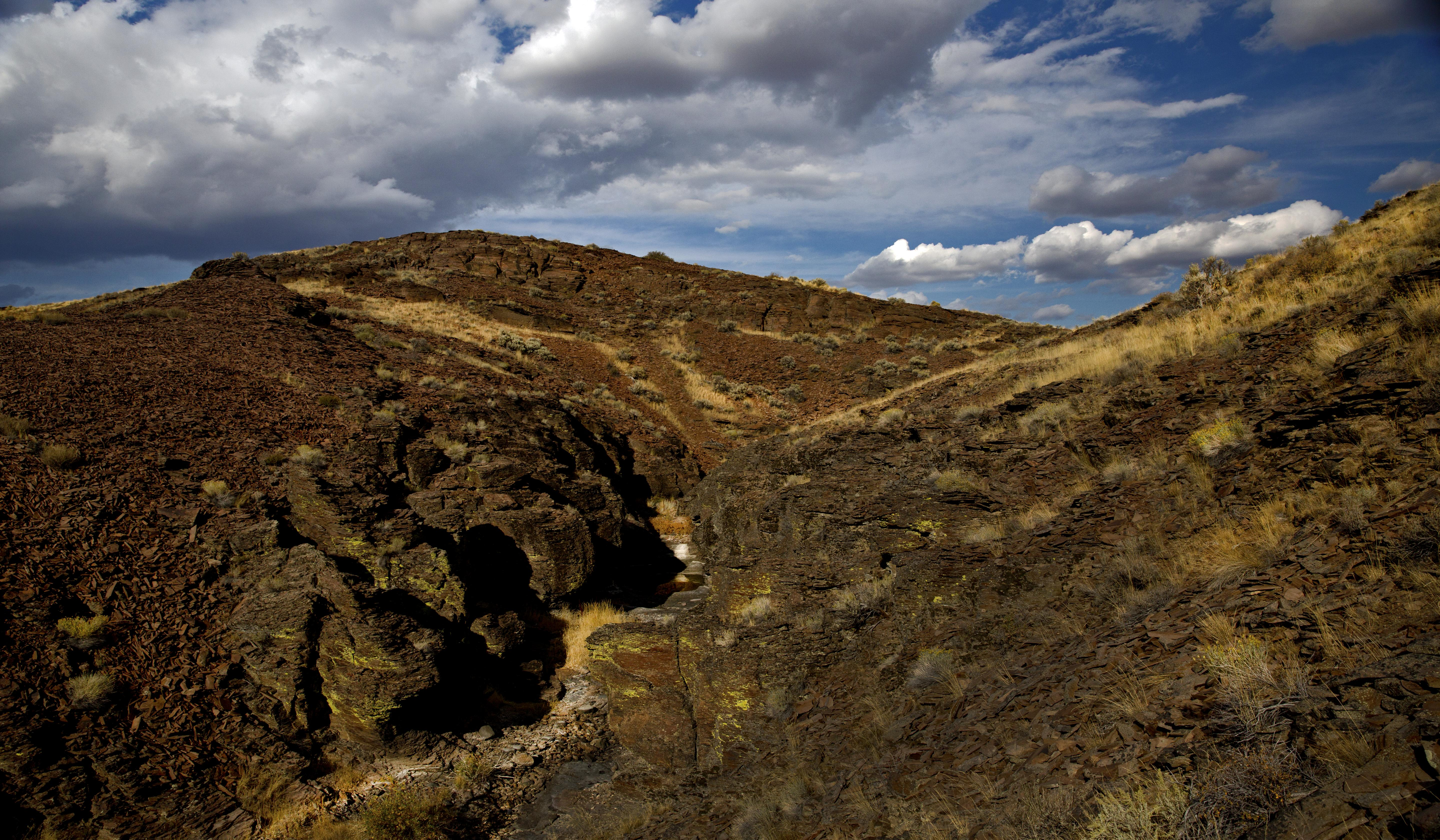

Location
- Country: United States
- State: Idaho
- County: Owyhee County, Idaho

Physical characteristics
- Mouth: Confluence with Deep Creek
- Length: 9.3 m (31 ft)

Dickshooter is the name of a trailmarker and also of at least three features in Owyhee County, Idaho: a ridge, a reservoir, and a creek. These are in close proximity to each other in the southwestern corner of the state, in a wilderness area approximately 24 miles (39 km) northwest of Riddle.

The trailmarker is between Battle Creek and Deep Creek. The area is popular for its year-round recreational activities, which include hiking, camping, hunting, fishing, swimming, bird watching, all-terrain vehicle riding, mountain biking, cross-country skiing, and snowmobiling. Surrounding areas are inhabited by bighorn sheep, elk, antelope, deer, bear, bobcat, mountain lion, grouse, and birds of prey. The place is isolated, being a few hours drive from passable roads.

Dickshooter Creek is listed in the National Wild and Scenic Rivers System. It flows south into Deep Creek and dries out in the summer months. The gorge cut by the creek is a popular site for hiking and backpacking.

Dickshooter Ridge is a wilderness area that provides a habitat for sage grouse and bighorn sheep. It was once proposed to be used as an "enemy village" target for Air Force bombing exercises. Dickshooter Ridge Road was once used to travel from Silver City, Idaho to Salt Lake City in Utah, and to Humboldt County, Nevada, and offered "spectacular views of vertical walled gorges and vistas of the surrounding desert plateaus."

The United States Congress adopted the Omnibus Public Land Management Act of 2009, which is designated to protect wilderness states and includes the area around the Creek and the Ridge.

== Origin of the name ==
Dickshooter was named for Dick Shooter, a pioneer settler. Dickshooter has frequently been noted on lists of unusual place names.
