= Mount Mitchell (Oregon) =

Mountain in Oregon, United States

- Location within Oregon Location within the United States

Highest point
- Elevation: 5,059 ft (1,542 m)
- Prominence: 360 ft (110 m)
- Coordinates: 45°06′31″N 121°58′48″W

Geography
- Location: Clackamas County, Oregon, U.S.; Mount Hood National Forest; Roaring River Wilderness
- Parent range: Cascades
- Topo map: USGS Mount Mitchell

Mount Mitchell is a mountain in Clackamas County in the U.S. state of Oregon. It is located southwest of Mount Hood in the Roaring River Wilderness on the Mount Hood National Forest.

The mountain was named for Roy Mitchell, a veteran of World War I who died fighting a wild fire. Prior to 1923 the mountain had been known as Oak Grove mountain although there were no oak trees on the mountain.
