= Big Marsh Creek =

Stream in Klamath County, United States of America

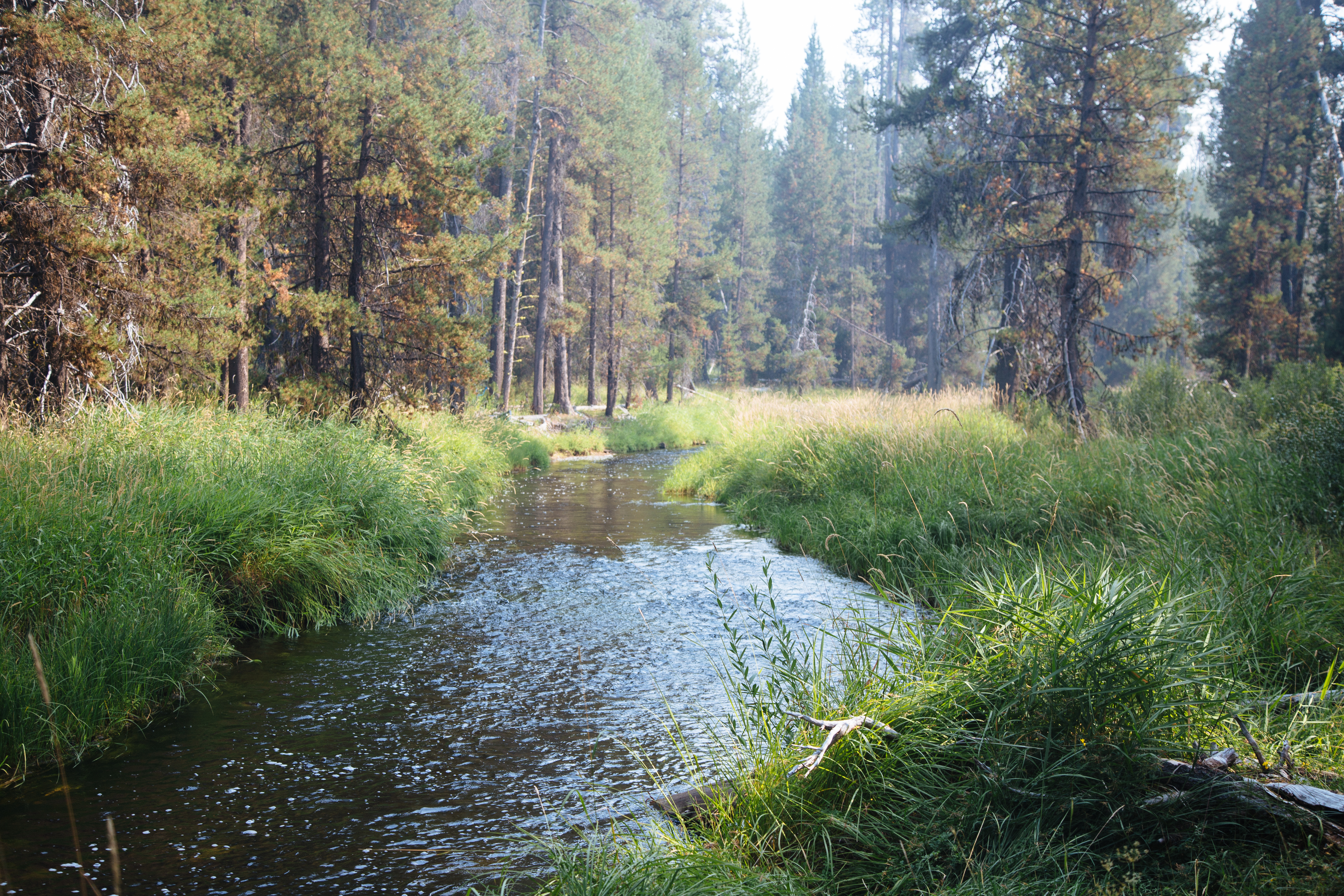

- Location of the mouth of Big Marsh Creek in Oregon

Location
- Country: United States
- State: Oregon
- County: Klamath

Physical characteristics
- Source: Big Marsh
  - location: Cascade Range, Deschutes National Forest
  - coordinates: 43°18′27″N 121°59′12″W
  - elevation: 6,797 ft (2,072 m)
- Mouth: Crescent Creek
  - location: downstream of Crescent Lake, Klamath County
  - coordinates: 43°28′56″N 121°54′35″W
  - elevation: 4,639 ft (1,414 m)
- Length: 15 mi (24 km)

National Wild and Scenic Rivers System
- Type: Recreational
- Designated: October 28, 1988

Big Marsh Creek is a 15-mile (24 km) tributary of Crescent Creek in Klamath County, in the U.S. state of Oregon. The creek flows generally north from its source upstream of Big Marsh, south of Crescent Lake on the eastern side of the Cascade Range. All of Big Marsh Creek and 10 miles (16 km) of Crescent Creek are parts of the National Wild and Scenic Rivers System. In turn, Crescent Creek is a tributary of the Little Deschutes River, of which 12 miles (19 km) in the same general area are also part of the national system.

The upper reaches of Big Marsh Creek flow through the Oregon Cascades National Recreation Area.

== See also ==
- List of rivers of Oregon
