= Roaring River (Clackamas River tributary) =

- Location of the mouth of the Roaring River in Oregon

Location
- Country: United States
- State: Oregon
- County: Clackamas County

Physical characteristics
- Source: near Signal Buttes
  - location: Cascade Range, Roaring River Wilderness, Mount Hood National Forest
  - coordinates: 45°09′40″N 121°55′36″W
  - elevation: 4,391 ft (1,338 m)
- Mouth: Clackamas River
  - coordinates: 45°09′29″N 122°07′02″W
  - elevation: 955 ft (291 m)
- Length: 13.7 mi (22.0 km)
- Basin size: 44 sq mi (110 km^{2})
- Discharge
  - average: 170 cu ft/s (4.8 m^{3}/s)

National Wild and Scenic River
- Type: Wild, Recreational
- Designated: October 28, 1988

Roaring River is a 13.7-mile (22.0 km) tributary of the Clackamas River in Clackamas County, Oregon. Beginning near Signal Buttes on the western flank of the Cascade Range, the river flows generally west through parts of Mount Hood National Forest to meet the larger river 44 miles (71 km) from its mouth on the Willamette River.

The river's watershed generally overlaps the Roaring River Wilderness, a 36,500-acre (14,800 ha) federally protected area established in 2009. The area is off-limits to commercial logging and mechanized recreation though still open to fishing, camping, hunting, hiking, and many other activities.

The entire length of Roaring River was named part of the National Wild and Scenic Rivers System in 1988. Most of this was declared wild, though the last two-tenths of a mile were designated recreational.

== Tributaries ==
Named tributaries in downstream order from source to mouth are Cougar and Splintercat creeks, which enter from the left; Plaza and Squaw creeks, from the right, and Shining Creek, South Fork Roaring River, and Grouse Creek, all from the left. The South Fork is also part of the wild and scenic rivers system.

== Recreation ==
Whitewater enthusiasts sometimes run the lowermost 3.2 miles (5.1 km) of the river, taking forest roads and a hiking trail to the put-in point and taking out at the bridge carrying Oregon Route 224 over the river near the Roaring River Campground. This run is rated Class IV (advanced), on the International Scale of River Difficulty. Dangers include ledges, boulders, and shifting wood hazards that require scouting and multiple portages.

== See also ==
- List of National Wild and Scenic Rivers
- List of rivers of Oregon
