= Frankenfield Covered Bridge =

- U.S. National Register of Historic Places
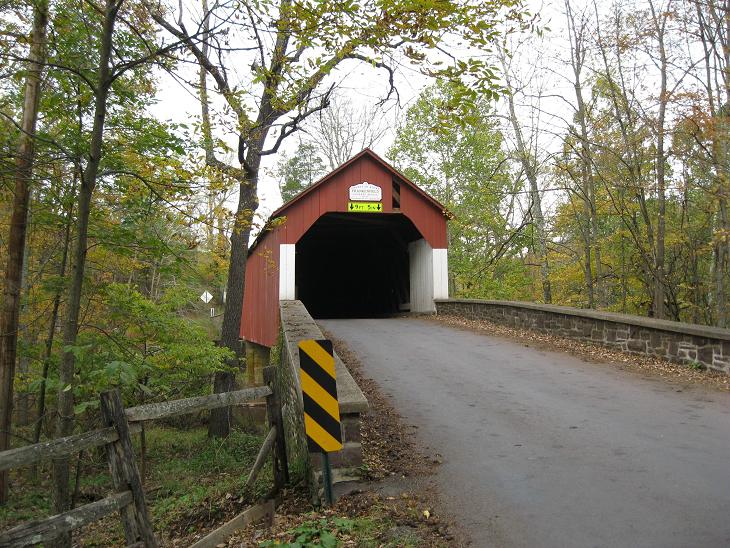
- South end of Frankenfield Covered Bridge

- Location within Pennsylvania Location within the United States
- Location: North of Tinicum on Township 421, Point Pleasant, Pennsylvania
- Coordinates: 40°28′33″N 75°5′58″W
- Built: 1872
- Architectural style: Town truss
- MPS: Covered Bridges of the Delaware River Watershed TR
- NRHP reference No.: 80003444
- Added to NRHP: December 1, 1980

The Frankenfield Covered Bridge is a wooden covered bridge that spans Tinicum Creek in Point Pleasant, Pennsylvania, United States. The bridge is located in Bucks County on Cafferty Road about 0.6 miles (1.0 km) southeast of Headquarters Road, near Vansant Airport, and a similar distance northwest of East Dark Hollow Road, near Palisades School District. Hollow Horn Road branches off from Cafferty Road a short distance from the south end of the span and goes south.

It was built in 1872, and is a town truss bridge constructed of oak. The sign on the Frankenfield covered bridge states that the structure is 130 feet (40 m) long with a clearance of 9.42 feet (2.87 m).

It was added to the National Register of Historic Places on December 1, 1980.

== Gallery ==
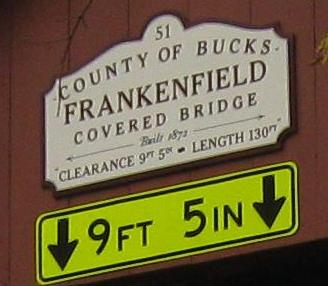
Sign on the bridge
