= Crescent Creek =

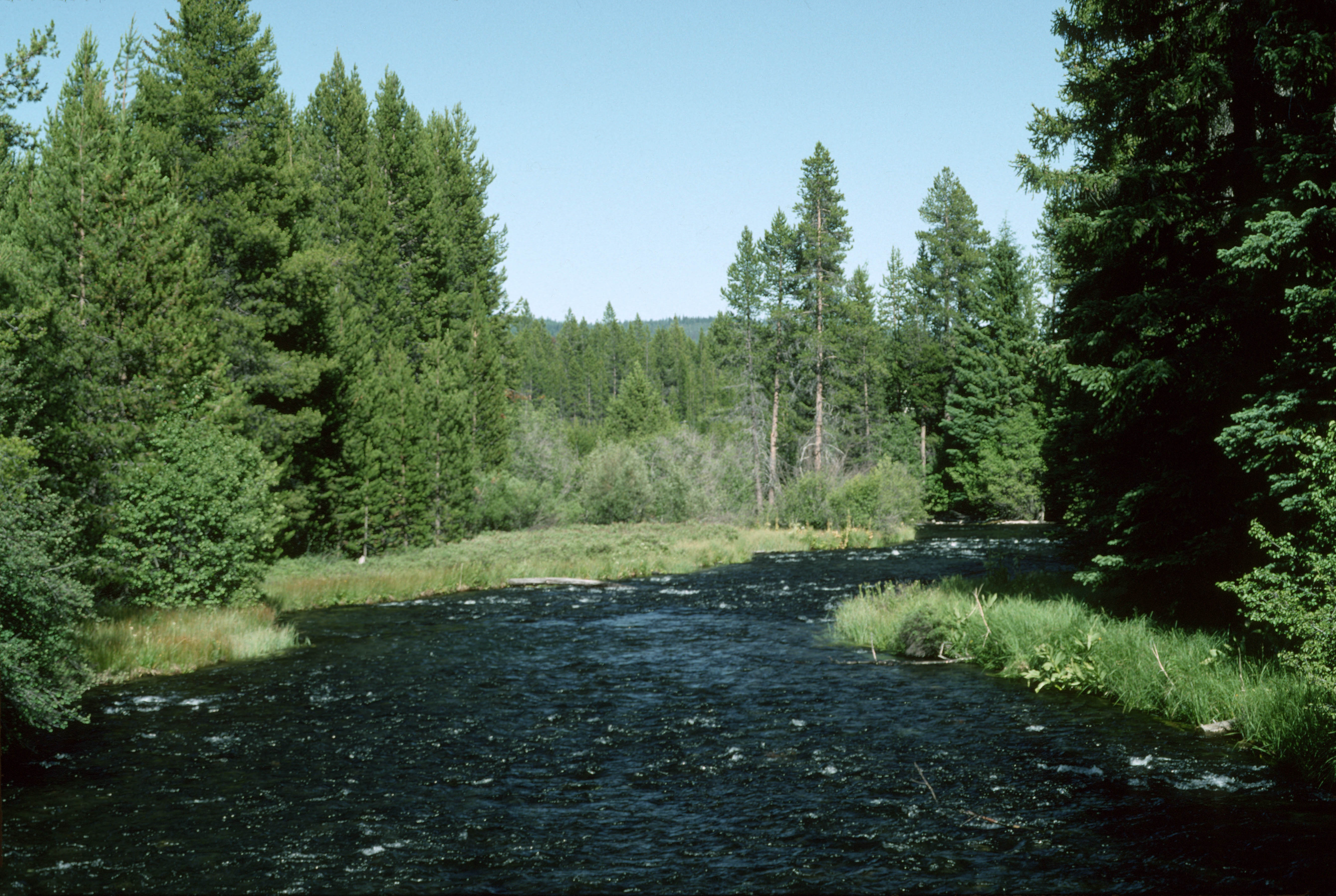
- Crescent Creek on the Deschutes National Forest

- Location of the mouth of Crescent Creek in Oregon

Location
- Country: United States
- State: Oregon
- County: Klamath

Physical characteristics
- Source: Crescent Lake
  - location: Deschutes National Forest, Cascade Range
  - coordinates: 43°30′05″N 121°58′25″W
  - elevation: 4,853 ft (1,479 m)
- Mouth: Little Deschutes River
  - coordinates: 43°31′45″N 121°39′06″W
  - elevation: 4,324 ft (1,318 m)
- Length: 30 mi (48 km)

National Wild and Scenic Rivers System
- Type: Recreational
- Designated: October 28, 1988

Crescent Creek is a 30-mile (48 km) tributary of the Little Deschutes River in Klamath County in the U.S. state of Oregon. Beginning at Crescent Lake on the eastern flank of the Cascade Range, the river flows generally east through parts of the Deschutes National Forest to meet the Little Deschutes between Crescent and La Pine.

A 10-mile (16 km) stretch of Crescent Creek was named part of the National Wild and Scenic Rivers System in 1988. Designated "recreational", the segment below Crescent Lake flows through a narrow canyon and a forest of old-growth pine. One of Crescent Creek's tributaries, Big Marsh Creek, is also part of the wild rivers system. The upper 12 miles (19 km) of the Little Deschutes is part of the system too.

The creek supports native rainbow trout, non-native brown trout and brook trout, and other species. The healthy and remote riparian zone along the upper creek supports a diversity of grasses, sedges, willows, and many species of birds, mammals, and amphibians.

Crescent Creek Campground, about 9 miles (14 km) west of Crescent, has nine individual camping sites, potable water, and a vault toilet. Open from mid-May through September, it is relatively remote and quiet, with opportunities for bird-watching and fishing.

The flow of Crescent Creek is regulated by storage and releases of water for irrigation from Crescent Lake. A stream gauge operated by the United States Bureau of Reclamation at the outlet of Crescent Lake shows an average highest discharge of about 140 cubic feet per second (4.0 m^{3}/s) to Crescent Creek in August when irrigation releases are highest. The average discharge drops to its lowest, about 10 cubic feet per second (0.28 m^{3}/s), in November when water is being stored.

== See also ==
- List of National Wild and Scenic Rivers
- List of rivers of Oregon
