= Surprise Canyon Creek =

Spring creek in Inyo County, California

Surprise Canyon Creek is a perennial spring creek in Inyo County, California, flowing out of the west side of the Panamint Mountains in Death Valley National Park. The creek runs through Panamint City, a silver-mining ghost town, before flowing through the Surprise Canyon Wilderness and exiting the canyon.

The perennial nature of the stream creates a unique ecosystem in the otherwise arid region, providing habitat for riparian trees like cottonwoods and willows. Many sensitive or protected species call the canyon home, including multiple bat species, the desert bighorn sheep, and the ringtail cat.

== National Wild and Scenic River designation ==
On March 12, 2019, a 5.3-mile (8.5 km) section of the creek, including the entire length in Death Valley National Park, was designated Wild, and a 1.8-mile (2.9 km) section in Surprise Canyon Wilderness was designated Recreational.
