= Palm Canyon Creek =

Tributary of the Whitewater River in Southern California

Location
- Country: United States
- State: California
- County: Riverside County

Physical characteristics
- Mouth
  - coordinates: 33.5867°N 116.4989°W

National Wild and Scenic River
- Type: Wild
- Designated: March 30, 2009

Palm Canyon Creek is a creek in Riverside County, Southern California, United States. The creek's headwaters are in the San Jacinto Mountains, and the creek flows underground north until it joins the Whitewater River, with only occasional surface water. 8.1 miles of the creek were designated wild as part of the national Wild and Scenic River system following the passing of the Omnibus Public Land Management Act of 2009.

The creek takes its name from the California fan palm, and it is the only river in the Wild and Scenic system with a palm tree canopy. It also supports the nation's largest fan palm oasis. The canyon the stream flows through is revered by the Agua Caliente Band of Cahuilla Indians, and many cultural sites can be seen in the canyon, including rock art and agave roasting pits.
