= Illabot Creek =

Stream in Skagit County, Washington, US

Coordinates: 48°29′42″N 121°31′48″W

Illabot Creek (Lushootseed: x̌əlabac, lit. 'hollow cedar tree') is a designated National Wild and Scenic River in Northern Washington which provides a spawning and rearing habitat for summer and fall chinook, coho, chum and pink salmon, as well as steelhead and bull trout. The creek is in the Skagit River watershed. Puget Sound Chinook, steelhead and bull trout are listed under the Endangered Species Act. Illabot Creek also supports the highest density of chum and pink salmon in the Skagit River watershed. The creek area also provides habitat for wintering bald eagles that are attracted to the salmon, part of one of the largest concentration of wintering bald eagles in the continental United States.

The creek is generally managed by the U.S. Forest Service, Mount Baker–Snoqualmie National Forest with a protected length of 14.3 miles (23.0 km) and as a reported area of 2.15 square miles (5.6 km^{2}). A 2018 project invested $4.4 million in restoration of fish habitat along the creek. The National Wild and Scenic Rivers protection was authorized by Congress in December 2014.

Illabot Creek begins at the 7,500 feet elevation in the Mount Baker–Snoqualmie National Forest and enters the Skagit River in Rockport, Washington. 262 acres (106 ha) of property around the creek was acquired in 2017 by The Nature Conservancy and placed in the Skagit Land Trust.
