= Mount Mitchell (Washington) =

Mountain in Washington (state), United States

- Location within Washington (state)

Highest point
- Elevation: 3,980 ft (1,213 m) NAVD 88
- Prominence: 1,040 ft (320 m)
- Coordinates: 46°01′51″N 122°11′35″W

Geography
- Location: Skamania County, Washington, U.S.
- Parent range: Cascades
- Topo map: USGS Mount Mitchell

Mount Mitchell is a mountain located in Skamania County in Washington state. On a clear day the summit provides excellent views of four of the Cascade's most massive volcanoes: Mount Rainier, Mount Adams, Mount Hood and Mount St. Helens, which rises 11.7 miles (18.8 km) to the north.
