= Eagle Creek (Clackamas River tributary) =

Tributary of the Clackamas River in Oregon

Location
- Country: United States
- State: Oregon
- County: Clackamas County

Physical characteristics
- Source: Mount Hood National Forest, Oregon
  - coordinates: 45°13′54.4″N 122°1′2.5″W
- Mouth: Clackamas River
  - location: Bonnie Lure State Recreation Area, Clackamas County, Oregon
  - coordinates: 45°21′11.3″N 122°22′56.2″W

National Wild and Scenic River
- Type: Wild
- Designated: March 30, 2009

Eagle Creek is a stream in Clackamas County, Oregon. It begins in the Salmon-Huckleberry Wilderness on the western side of the Cascade Range, flowing west out of the mountains until it joins the Clackamas River near the town of Estacada. 8.3 miles of the stream, from its headwaters in the wilderness to the Mount Hood National Forest boundary, are protected under the National Wild and Scenic Rivers System following the passage of the Omnibus Public Land Management Act on March 30, 2009, and administered by the U.S. Forest Service.
