= Dickshooter Creek =

River in Idaho, United States

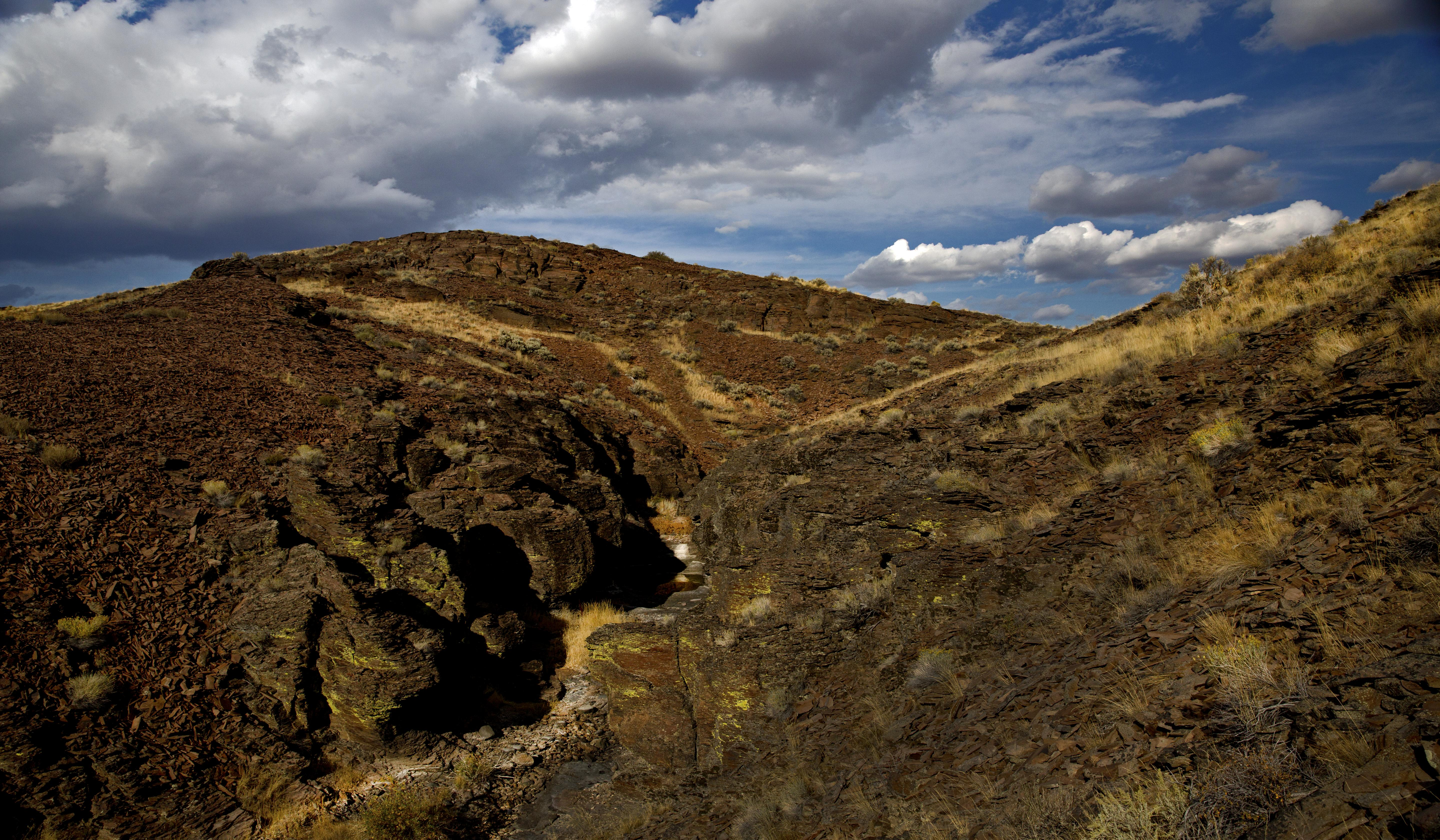
- Dickshooter Creek (Bureau of Land Management)

- Dickshooter Creek mouth location in Idaho Dickshooter Creek (the United States)

Location
- Country: United States
- State: Idaho
- County: Owyhee County, Idaho

Physical characteristics
- Source: Willow Spring, Idaho
  - location: Owyhee County, Idaho
  - coordinates: 42°20′25″N 116°36′31″W
  - elevation: 5,565 ft (1,696 m)
- Mouth: Deep Creek
  - location: Owyhee River Wilderness
  - coordinates: 42°20′25″N 116°36′31″W
  - elevation: 4,689 ft (1,429 m)
- Length: 23.1 mi (37.2 km)
- Basin size: 49,010 acres (76.58 sq mi)

Basin features
- River system: Owyhee River System

National Wild and Scenic Rivers System
- Type: Wild
- Designated: March 30, 2009

Dickshooter Creek is a 23.1 miles (37.2 km) long stream in southwest Idaho, approximately 25 miles (40 km) northwest of Riddle. Its watershed is entirely made up of rangeland. It has very low water flow, and dries up during the summer months. It is a common location for hiking and backpacking, particularly during the summer months.

== Name ==
Dickshooter Creek follows the naming scheme of the ridge, reservoir, and trailmarker of the same name. It was named after pioneer settler Dick Shooter, who built a settlement in the area.

== Course ==
Dickshooter Creek's source is Willow Spring, at elevation 5,565 ft (1,696 m). From there, it travels west, creating a pool called Willow Meadows Reservoir Three, then north and around the abandoned settlement of Dickshooter. As it continues, it carves out a small gorge called Black Canyon as it travels south before joining Deep Creek in the Owyhee River Wilderness

== Protected status ==
Most of the lower creek became part of the Owyhee River Wilderness after President Barack Obama signed the Omnibus Public Land Management Act of 2009 on March 30, 2009. This lower part, 9.3 miles long, was added to the National Wild and Scenic Rivers System, to be administered by the Bureau of Land Management, on account of the creek's outstanding fish, geology, recreation, and wildlife qualities.
