= Little Blitzen River =

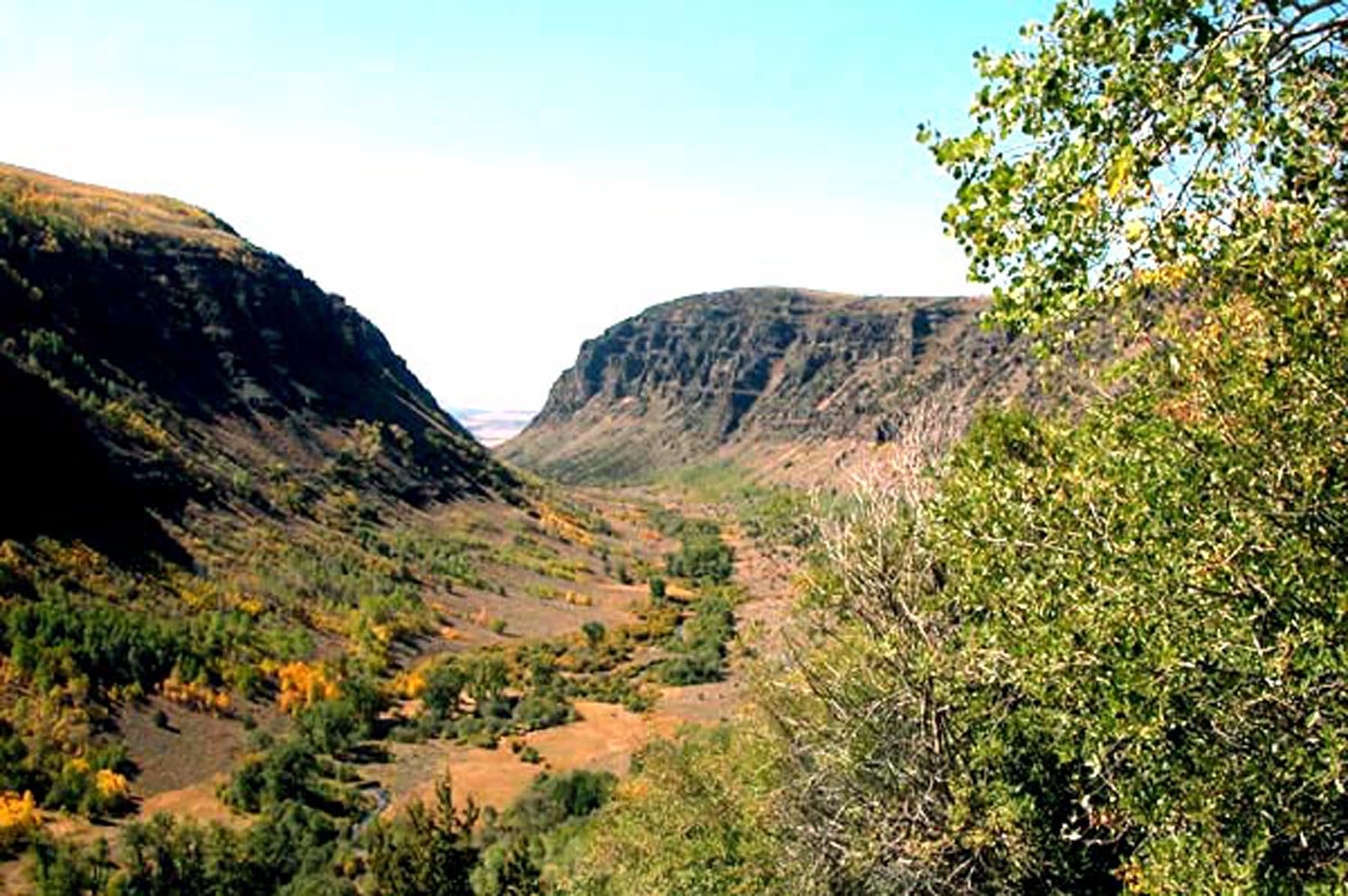
- Little Blitzen U-Shaped Gorge

- Location of the mouth of Little Blitzen River in Oregon
- Etymology: German for lightning. Given in 1864 by soldiers who crossed the main stem during a thunderstorm and named it Donner und Blitzen (thunder and lightning).

Location
- Country: United States
- State: Oregon
- County: Harney

Physical characteristics
- Source: Steens Mountain
  - location: Little Blitzen Gorge, Harney County, Oregon
  - coordinates: 42°40′33″N 118°34′56″W
  - elevation: 8,975 ft (2,736 m)
- Mouth: Donner und Blitzen River
  - location: near Riddle Ranch, Harney County, Oregon
  - coordinates: 42°40′26″N 118°47′37″W
  - elevation: 4,862 ft (1,482 m)
- Length: 12.5 mi (20.1 km)

National Wild and Scenic River
- Type: Wild

Little Blitzen River is a 12.5-mile (20.1 km) tributary of the Donner und Blitzen River in the U.S. state of Oregon. Little Blitzen River rises on the west flank of Steens Mountain about 20 miles (32 km) southeast of Frenchglen and about 70 miles (110 km) south of Burns in Harney County. Flowing west in a steep-walled canyon, it joins the South Fork Donner und Blitzen River at 42.6737752°N 118.7935277°W to form the Donner und Blitzen main stem, which continues north about another 40 miles (64 km) to its mouth at 43.291542°N 118.8199273°W in Malheur Lake. The Donner und Blitzen River was named by soldiers of German origin and translates as "thunder and lightning". Little Blitzen River brings to mind one of Santa Claus's reindeer.

As part of the Omnibus Oregon Wild and Scenic Rivers Act of 1988, Congress designated "the 12.5-mile segment of the Little Blitzen from its headwaters to its confluence with the South Fork Blitzen" as Wild and Scenic. It is part of the nation's first Great Basin redband trout reserve, established by Congress in 2000. The American Hiking Society has listed Little Blitzen Gorge Trail among its 10 "hidden gems".

== Geology ==
Little Blitzen Gorge, down which the river flows, is one of four huge U-shaped trenches carved by ice on the western face of Steens Mountain during the most recent glacial period. The mountain, 30 miles (48 km) long, is the largest fault-block mountain in the northern Great Basin. Although its eastern face is almost vertical, its western face slopes more gradually. Cut through basalt, the western canyons are up to 1/2 mile (0.80 km) deep. Little Blitzen River begins at about 9,000 feet (2,700 m) above sea level near the top of the mountain and loses about 4,000 feet (1,200 m) in elevation between source and mouth.

== Conservation ==
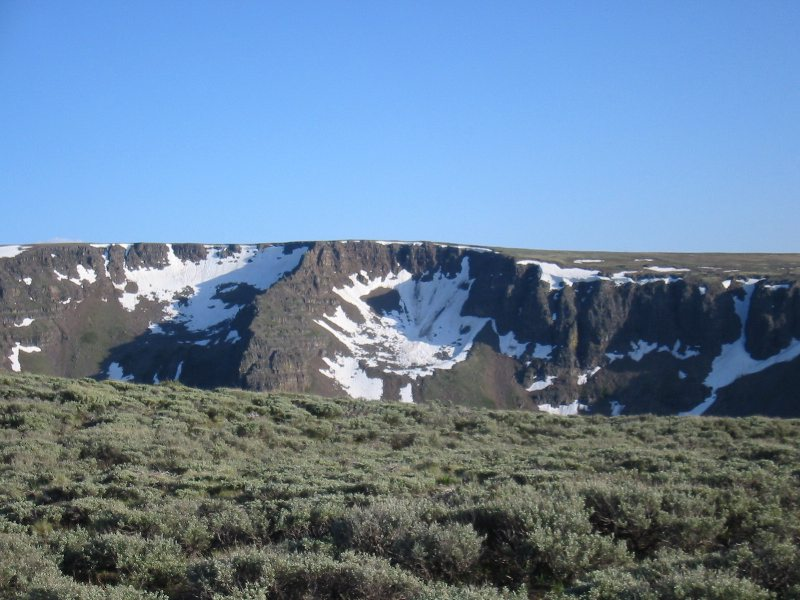
Little Blitzen Gorge from near the summit of Steens Mountain

Much of Little Blitzen's watershed lies within the Steens Mountain Cooperative Management and Protection Area (CMPA), established in 2000 to protect the region's long-term environmental integrity. The CMPA encompasses about 425,000 acres (172,000 ha) of public land managed by the federal Bureau of Land Management (BLM) and the Steens Mountain Advisory Council. About 100,000 acres (40,000 ha) along the top of the mountain are protected as "livestock-free wilderness". Little Blitzen Research Natural Area (RNA), a protected area of 2,540 acres (1,030 ha), lies at the head of Little Blitzen Gorge. The RNA protects terrestrial and aquatic ecosystems as well as individual plant species such as wedgeleaf saxifrage, Steens Mountain whitlow grass, and Davidson's penstemon. The Donner und Blitzen system, including Little Blitzen River, provides habitat for a unique population of Great Basin redband trout, protected in the nation's first-ever redband trout reserve. The reserve consists of "the public land portion of the Donner und Blitzen River and tributaries upstream of its confluence with Fish Creek to the longitudinal extent of current and future redband trout distribution, and the width of the flood-prone area."

== Recreation ==
Little Blitzen River is a National Wild and Scenic River, a designation applied to the Donner und Blitzen River and all of its major tributaries from the headwaters to the southern boundary of the Malheur National Wildlife Refuge near Frenchglen. Recreational opportunities along the river include wildlife watching, camping, fishing, and hiking. The Oregon Department of Fish and Wildlife limits fishing on Little Blitzen to catch-and-release throughout the year. The American Hiking Society and American Rivers have listed Little Blitzen Gorge Trail, with its wildflowers and waterfalls, among their "Ten Hidden Gems of the National Landscape Conservation System".

== See also ==
- List of rivers of Oregon
