= Rapp Creek (Tinicum Creek tributary) =

Rapp Creek Rapp Run
- Rapp Creek

Location
- Country: United States
- State: Pennsylvania
- County: Bucks County
- Township: Nockamixon Township

Physical characteristics
- Source: Pond
  - location: Pond near Lake Warren
  - coordinates: 40°32′36″N 75°09′26″W
  - elevation: 530 feet (160 m)
- Mouth
  - location: Confluence of Rapp Creek and Beaver Creek forming the headwaters of Tinicum Creek
  - coordinates: 40°28′50″N 75°08′48″W
  - elevation: 240 feet (73 m)
- Length: 5.71 miles (9.19 km)
- Basin size: 6.97 square miles (18.1 km^{2})

Basin features
- Progression: Rapp Creek-Tinicum Creek-Delaware River
- River system: Delaware River
- Waterbodies: Lake Warren
- Bridges: Lake Warren Road, Lonely Cottage Road, Colonial Way, Marienstein Road, Beaver Run Road, Quarry Road, Bunker Hill Road, Clay Ridge Road

Rapp Creek is a tributary of Tinicum Creek in Nockamixon Township, Bucks County, Pennsylvania in the United States. Rapp Creek is part of the Delaware River watershed.

== Statistics ==
Rapp Creek was entered into the Geographic Names Information System on 2 August 1979 as identification number 1184658. It appears in the Pennsylvania Gazetteer of Streams as identification number 03235 which indicates that Rapp Creek has a watershed of 6.97 square miles (18.1 km^{2}). Rapp Creek and Beaver Creek meet their confluences together at Tinicum Creek's 6.40 river mile.

== Course ==
The headwaters of Rapp Creek rises from an unnamed pond south of Coffman Hill in upper Bucks County and flows into Lake Warren within a few hundred feet. Lake Warren was formed as a result of an earthen dam about 1935 and is owned by the Pennsylvania Fish and Game Commission. The dam is about 10 feet high, 110 feet long which allows Warren to contain a surface area of 15 acres (6.1 ha). After Lake Warren, Rapp continues generally southeastward for about two-thirds of its length receiving a tributary from the left. Then as it turns to flow to the southeast, it picks up a tributary from the right bank next to a quarry. After a short length it meets Beaver Creek to form Tinicum Creek.

== Geology ==
- Appalachian Highlands Division
  - Piedmont Province
    - Gettysburg-Newark Lowland Section
      - Brunswick Formation
      - Lockatong Formation
      - Diabase

Rapp Creek begins in a region of diabase, an igneous intrusion rising during the Jurassic and the Triassic which consists of dark and very fine grained labradorite and augite. It then flows into the Lockatong Formation, a sedimentary layer consisting of dark-gray to black argillite, shale, with some limestone and calcareous shale. Shortly before it meets the Tinicum, it passes into the Brunswick Formation, which consists of sedimentary mudstone, siltstone, and shale. Mineralogy includes argillite and hornfels.

== Crossings and Bridges ==
Crossing	NBI Number	Length	Lanes	Spans	Material/Design	Built	Reconstructed	Latitude	Longitude
Clay Ridge Road	7567	17 metres (56 ft)	1	2	Steel stringer/multi-beam or girder	1917	-	40°28'54.3"N	75°8'49.2"W
Bunker Hill Road	-	-	-	-	-	-	-	-	-
Quarry Road	7573	16 metres (52 ft)	1	2	Masonry Arch-deck	1900	-	40°29'49.9"N	75°9'56.4"W
Beaver Run Road	7563	24 metres (79 ft)	2	1	Masonry Arch-deck	1902	1963	40°30'44.8"N	75°9'13.3"W
Marienstein Road	-	-	-	-	-	-	-	-	-
Colonial Way	-	-	-	-	-	-	-	-	-
Lonely Cottage Road	7625	7 metres (23 ft)	2	1	Steel stringer/multi-beam or girder	1960	-	40°31'58.9"N	75°9'14.5"W
Lake Warren Road	-	-	-	-	-	-	-	-	-

== See also ==
- List of rivers of the United States
- List of rivers of Pennsylvania
- List of Delaware River tributaries
