= Deep Creek (Owyhee River) =

Stream in Idaho, United States

Location
- Country: United States
- State: Idaho
- County: Owyhee County

Physical characteristics
- Mouth: Owyhee River
  - coordinates: 42.2648°N 116.6444°W
- Length: 39.5 mi (63.6 km)

Basin features
- Tributaries
  - left: Dickshooter Creek

National Wild and Scenic River
- Type: Wild
- Designated: March 30, 2009

Deep Creek is a 39.5-mile-long stream tributary of the Owyhee River in the southwestern corner of Idaho. The stream flows through rhyolite and basalt canyons from volcanic eruptions during the Miocene Era. On March 30, 2009, 13.1 miles of the stream, from the Owyhee River Wilderness boundary downstream to where the stream empties into the Owyhee River, were designated as wild in the National Wild and Scenic Rivers System. Dickshooter Creek, itself a Wild and Scenic river, empties into Deep Creek just after crossing the wilderness boundary.
