= Roaring River Wilderness =

Wilderness area in Oregon, United States

- IUCN category Ib (wilderness area)
- Interactive map of Roaring River Wilderness
- Location: Clackamas County, Oregon, United States
- Nearest city: Government Camp
- Coordinates: 45.2°N 121.9°W
- Area: 36,500 acres (14,800 ha)
- Established: 2009
- Governing body: United States Forest Service

Roaring River Wilderness is a wilderness area in the Mount Hood National Forest in Clackamas County, Oregon, United States. Southwest of Mount Hood, Oregon's tallest mountain, the 36,500-acre (14,800 ha) area was created in 2009. The wilderness area is named after the Roaring River that flows through the area and is a tributary of the Clackamas River.

== History ==
In 2004, Senator Ron Wyden of Oregon introduced legislation to add the area around the Roaring River to the Salmon–Huckleberry Wilderness. That bill did not pass and the next year several members of Oregon's delegation to the U.S. House proposed protecting the area as well. Sponsored by Earl Blumenauer and Greg Walden, this bill would have created a new wilderness area for the river's valley and received unanimous support in committee. The Bush administration supported some expansion of the wilderness areas around Mount Hood, but not as much as proposed by the bill. This bill also failed to become law, and in February 2007, Wyden and fellow Senator Gordon Smith introduced another bill to create the Roaring River Wilderness. The area officially became a protected wilderness area in March 2009 when the Omnibus Public Land Management Act of 2009 was signed into law by President Barack Obama.

== Details ==
Located southwest of Mount Hood, the area includes 1,000-year-old trees in its old-growth forest. Prior to designation as a wilderness area the Dry Ridge, Grouse Point, Serene Lake, Shellrock Lake, and Shining Lake trails were open to use by mountain bikes. Lakes in the area include the Rock Lakes and Serene Lake, while Cache Meadow is one of the many alpine meadows. The river itself is a spawning habitat for several salmon species and is a tributary to the Clackamas River. Flora and fauna include spotted owls, pileated woodpeckers, bears, cougars, elk, mule deer, salamanders, huckleberry, salal, and sword ferns among others.

== See also ==
- List of Oregon Wildernesses
- List of U.S. Wilderness Areas
- Wilderness Act
