= Crescent Lake (Oregon) =

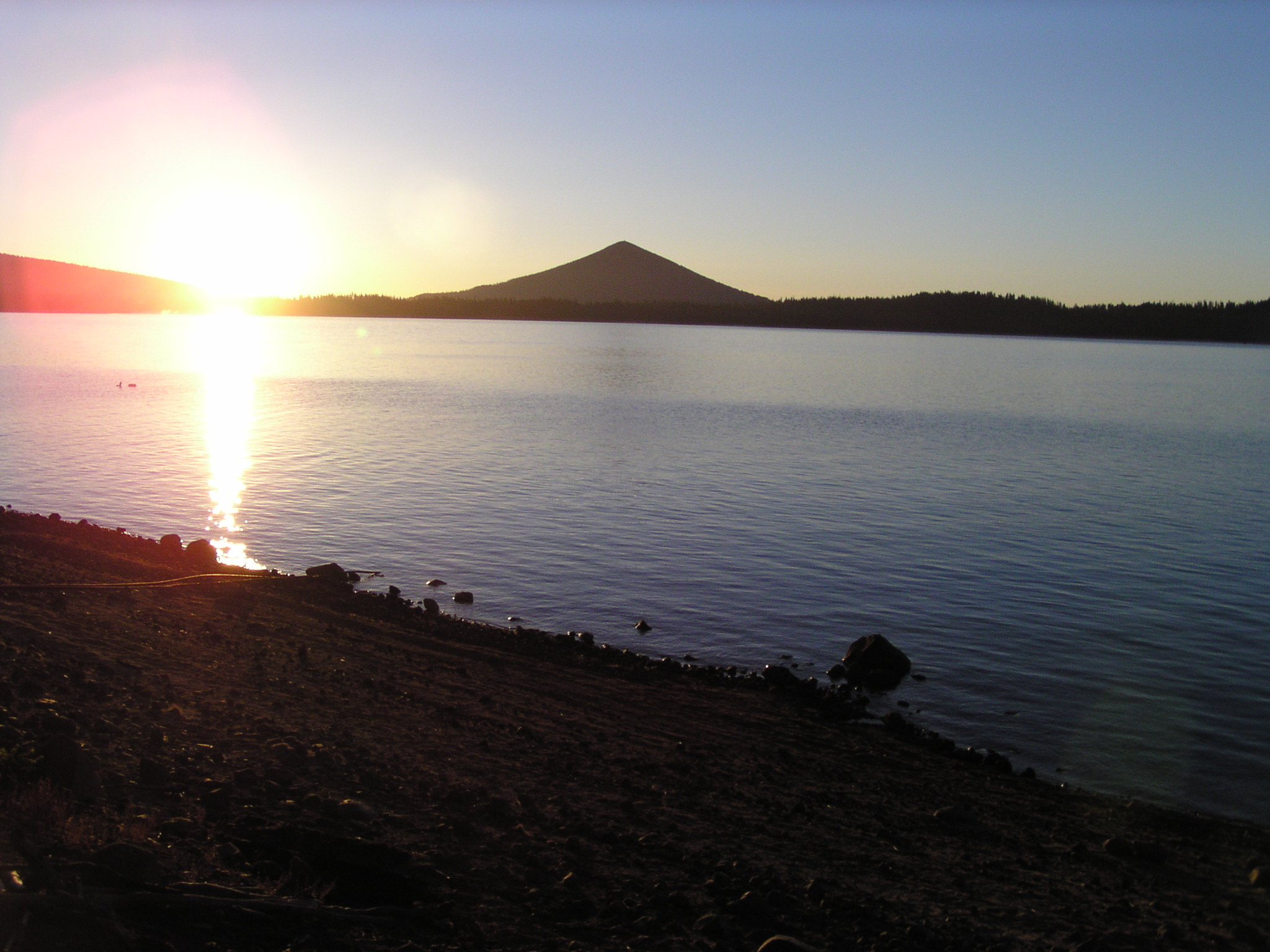
- Crescent Lake at sunrise with Odell Butte in the background

- Location of Crescent Lake in Oregon, USA. Crescent Lake (the United States)
- Location: Klamath County, Oregon
- Coordinates: 43°28′32″N 121°59′31″W
- Type: Natural lake (with dam)
- Primary inflows: Summit Creek
- Primary outflows: Crescent Creek
- Catchment area: 57 sq mi (150 km^{2})
- Basin countries: United States
- Max. length: 5 mi (8.0 km)
- Max. width: 4 mi (6.4 km)
- Surface area: 4,547 acres (18.40 km^{2})
- Average depth: 124 ft (38 m)
- Max. depth: 265 ft (81 m)
- Water volume: 566,600 acre-feet (698,900,000 m^{3})
- Residence time: 13 years
- Shore length^{1}: 12.4 mi (20.0 km)
- Surface elevation: 4,839 ft (1,475 m)
- ^{1} Shore length is not a well-defined measure.

Crescent Lake is a natural lake on the eastern side of the Cascade Range in the northwest corner of Klamath County, Oregon, United States. The unincorporated community of Crescent Lake Junction on Oregon Route 58 and Crescent Lake State Airport are located 2.5 miles (4.0 km) northeast of the lake. The lake was named for its shape by Byron J. Pengra and William Holman Odell in July 1865.

== Recreation ==
Crescent Lake is located within the Crescent Ranger District of the Deschutes National Forest. The area has many trails for hiking, horseback riding, and mountain biking, and areas for off-road vehicles. There are also a few developed campsites and boat ramps that provide opportunities for sailing, water skiing, camping and fishing.

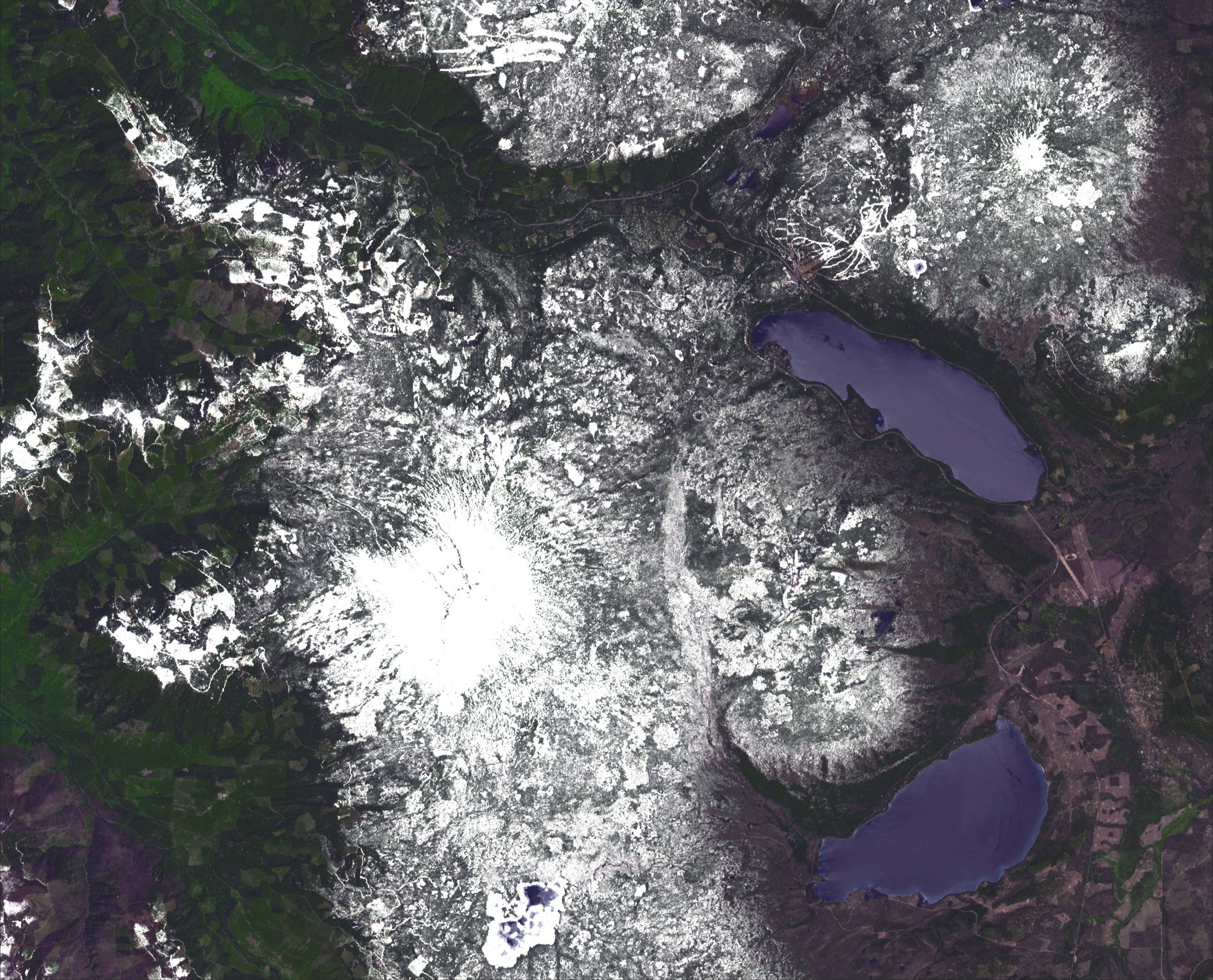
Crescent Lake (bottom right) SE of Diamond Peak

Fish species found in the lake include:

- Rainbow trout
- Kokanee salmon
- Mountain whitefish
- Brown trout – non-native introduced species
- Bull trout – listed as a threatened species

== See also ==
- List of lakes in Oregon
