= Tinicum Creek =

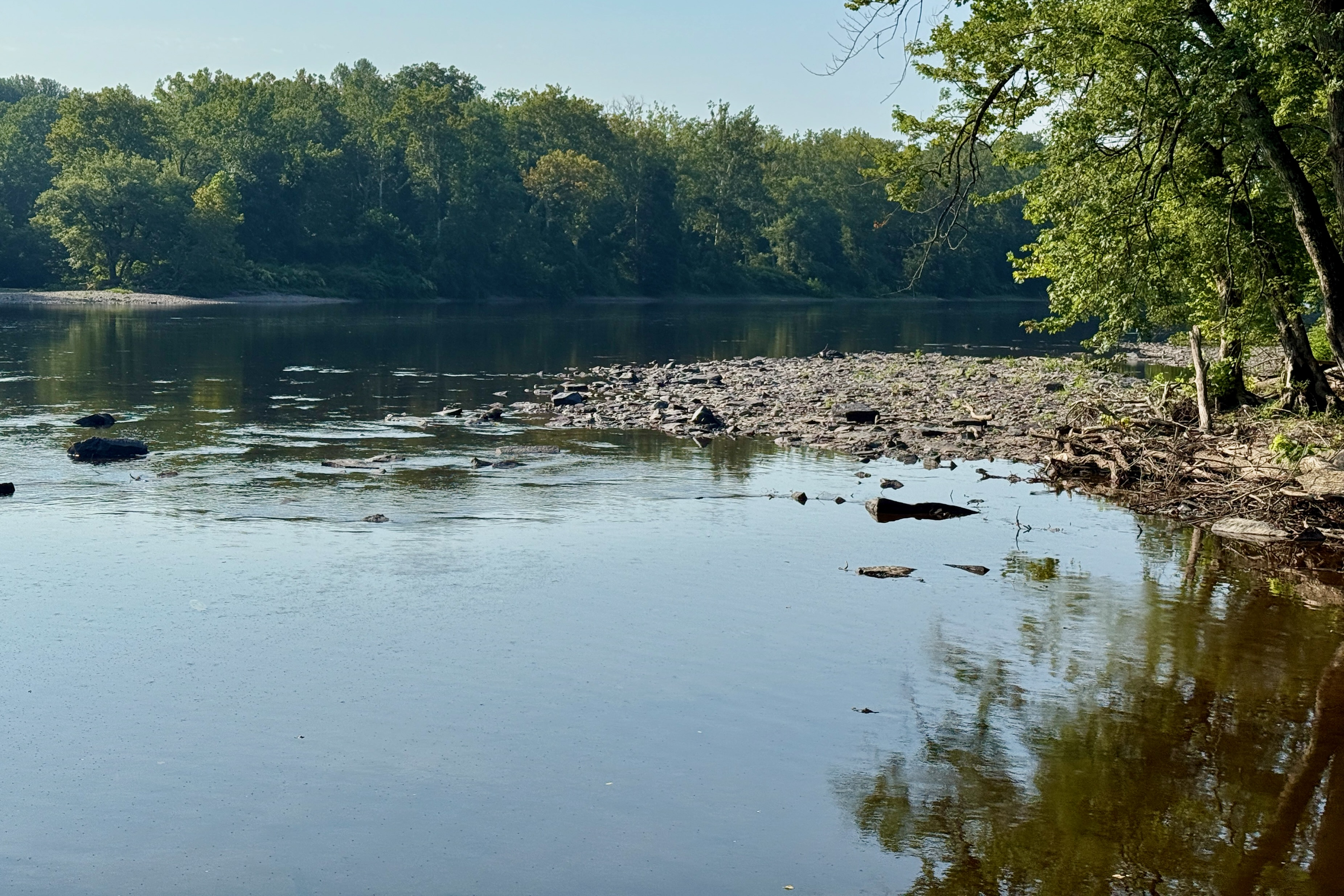
- Confluence with the Delaware River

- Tinicum Creek

Location
- Country: United States
- State: Pennsylvania
- County: Bucks
- Township: Tinicum

Physical characteristics
- Source: Rapp Creek, Beaver Creek
  - coordinates: 40°28′51.3″N 75°08′47.9″W
  - elevation: 240 feet (73 m)
- Mouth
  - coordinates: 40°29′08″N 75°4′4″W
  - elevation: 100 feet (30 m)
- Length: 6.44 miles (10.36 km)

Basin features
- River system: Delaware River
- Landmarks: Van Sant Airport
- Bridges: Geigel Hill Road, Sheep Hole Road, Sheep Hole Road, Headquarters Road, Municipal Road, Cafferty Road, Pennsylvania Route 32 (River Road)

National Wild and Scenic Rivers System

Tinicum Creek is a tributary of the Delaware River in Tinicum Township, Bucks County, Pennsylvania. It flows for 6.40 miles (10.30 km) from the confluence of its branches, Beaver Creek and Rapp Creek, before entering the river across from Marshall Island. Tinicum Creek and its two branches are part of the federally-designated Lower Delaware National Wild and Scenic River.

Historic crossings of Tinicum Creek include the Frankenfield Covered Bridge and an aqueduct of the Delaware Canal.

== Statistics ==
Tinicum Creek was added to the Geographical Names Information System of the U.S. Geological Survey on September 8, 1979 as identification number 1209346. It is listed in the PA Gazetteer of Streams as identification number 03218. As the largest stream in the northeast corner of Bucks County north of the Tohickon Creek, it boasts a watershed of 24 square miles (62 km^{2}) and meets its confluence at the Delaware River's 161.60 river mile.

== Course ==
Tinicum Creek rises near Cauffman Hill at the merger of Beaver Creek and Rapp Creek, and meanders, but generally flows southeast for about 1.73 miles (2.78 km), receiving two unnamed tributaries from the left, and one from the right. It, then, abruptly turns to the northwest at the point it receives another tributary from the southeast. Then the creek meanders generally to the northeast for approximately 4.75 miles (7.64 km) until it meets its confluence with the Delaware. The stream has a total length of 6.40 miles (10.30 km), the headwaters rises at an elevation of 240 feet (73 m), and its mouth is at an elevation of 100 feet (30 m), which is a drop of 140 feet (43 m). This results in an average slope of 21.875 feet per mile (3.93 meters per kilometer).

== Geology ==
- Appalachian Highlands Division
  - Piedmont Province
    - Gettysburg-Newark Lowland Section
      - Brunswick Formation
      - Diabase

The Brunswick Formation is a sedimentary layer of rock consisting of mudstone, siltstone, and beds of green, brown, and red-brown shale. Mineralogy consists of argillite and hornfels. About 200 million years ago, magma intruded into the Brunswick and cooled quickly forming a fine grained diabase consisting of primarily labradorite and augite.

== Crossings and Bridges ==
Crossing	NBI Number	Length	Lanes	Spans	Material/Design	Built	Reconstructed	Latitude	Longitude
Geigel Hill Road	47016	18 metres (59 ft)	1	1	Steel girder and floorbeam system	2011	-	40°28'48"N	75°8'54"W
Sheep Hole Road	7644	20 metres (66 ft)	2	1	Steel truss-thru	1932	1950	40°28'35.3"N	75°8'44.9"W
Sheep Hole Road	7561	19 metres (62 ft)	1	1	Steel truss-thru	1985	-	40°28'26"N	75°8'35"W
Headquarters Road	7128	24 metres (79 ft)	1	3	Continuous concrete stringer/multi-beam or grider	1919	-	40°28'14.6"N	75°8'11.96"W
Municipal Road	-	-	-	-	No bridge, road passes through creek bed	-	-	-	-
Frankenfield Covered Bridge (Cafferty Road)	7568	37 metres (121 ft)	1	2	Steel stringer/multi-beam or girder	-	1978	40°28'32.3"N	75°5'58.7"W
Pennsylvania Route 32 (River Road)	6811	52 metres (171 ft)	2	4	Steel stringer/multi-beam or girder	1932	1985	40°29'8.2"N	75°4'9.46"W

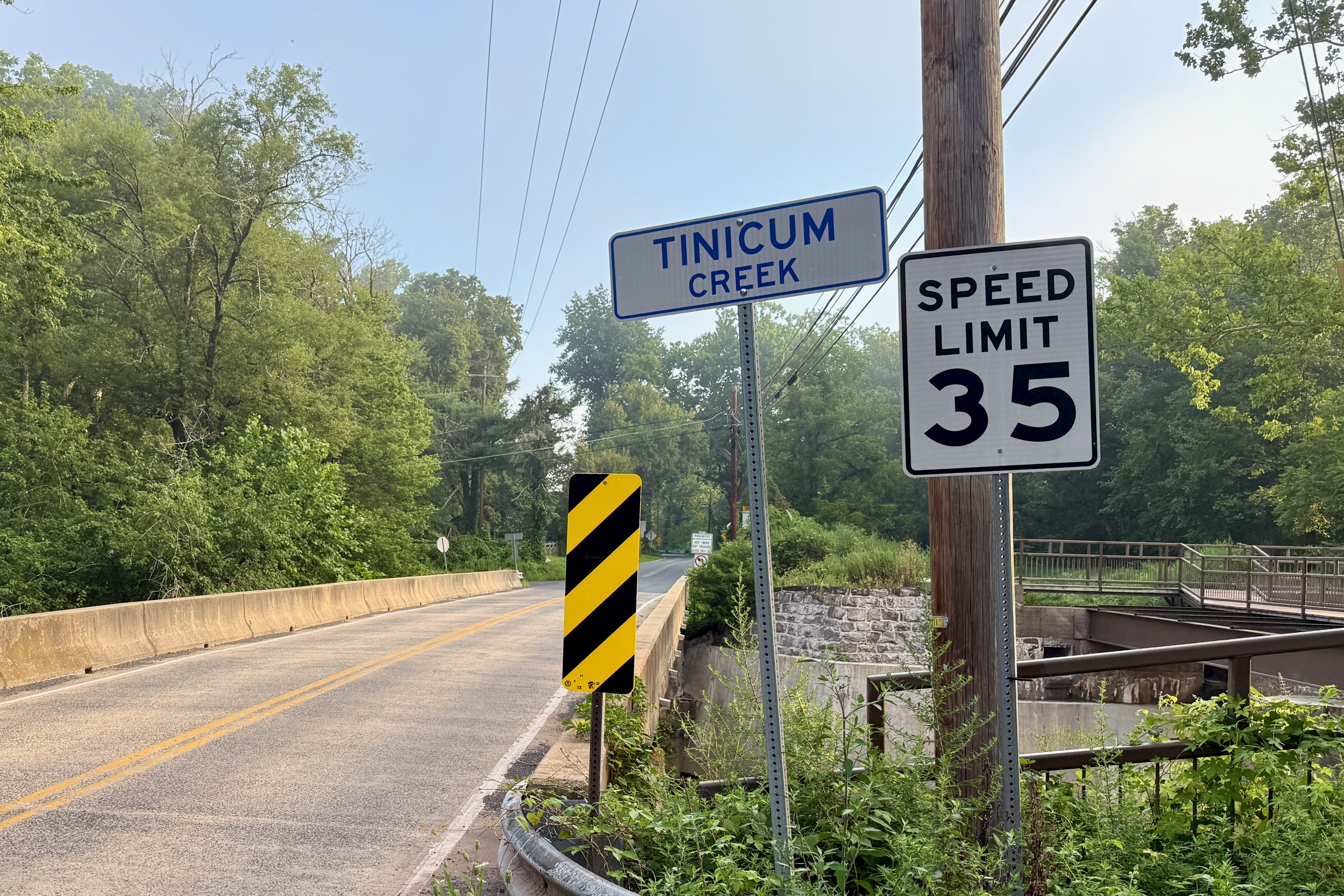
River Road Bridge

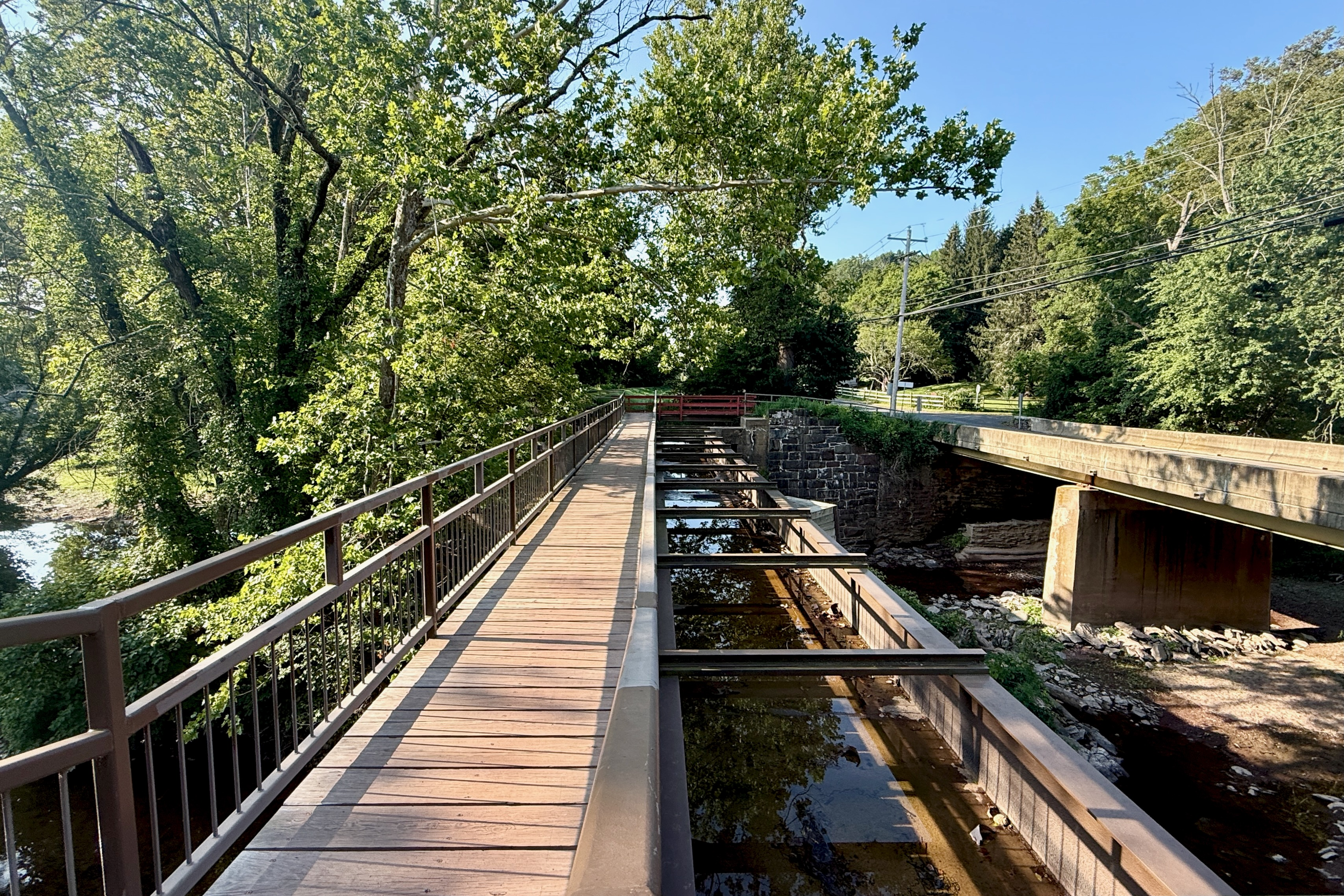
Tinicum Creek Aqueduct

== See also ==
- List of rivers of Pennsylvania
- List of rivers of the United States
- List of Delaware River tributaries
