= Beaver Creek (Tinicum Creek tributary) =

- Beaver Creek
- Native name: Amochkhanne (Delaware)

Location
- Country: United States
- State: Pennsylvania
- County: Bucks
- Township: Tinicum, Nockamixon, Bridgeton

Physical characteristics
- Source
  - coordinates: 40°32′14″N 75°7′20″W
  - elevation: 540 feet (160 m)
- Mouth
  - coordinates: 40°28′50″N 75°8′49″W
  - elevation: 226 feet (69 m)
- Length: 4.76 miles (7.66 km)
- Basin size: 6.83 square miles (17.7 km^{2})

Basin features
- Progression: Beaver Creek → Tinicum Creek → Delaware River → Delaware Bay
- River system: Delaware River
- Bridges: Lonely Cottage Road, Lonely Cottage Road, Strocks Grove Road, Rocky Ridge Road, Byers Road, Clay Ridge Road

Beaver Creek (Lenape name - Amochkhanne, Amoch=beaver, khanne=creek) is a tributary of Tinicum Creek in Bridgeton, Nockamixon, and Tinicum Townships in Bucks County, Pennsylvania, in the United States. The creek is part of the Delaware River watershed.

== Statistics ==
Beaver Creek was entered into the Geographic Names Information System on 2 August 1979 as identification number 1169002, its identification number in the PA Gazetteer of Streams is 3241.

== Course ==
Beaver Creek rises in Bridgeton Township near Lonely Cottage Road at an elevation of approximately 540 feet (160 m) and runs generally southwest for 3.68 miles (5.92 km) until it meets its confluence at Tinicum Creek's 6.41 river mile at an elevation of 226 feet (69 m). During its course it receives three tributaries from the left and three from the right. The average slope is 85.3 feet per mile (15.37 meters per kilometer).

== Geology ==
- Appalachian Highlands Division
  - Piedmont Province
    - Gettysburg-Newark Lowland Section
      - Diabase

Beaver Creek's course is located in a region of diabase rock which intruded into the local sedimentary layers of the Brunswick and Lockatong Formations during the Jurassic and the Triassic, then the remaining course flows over the Brunswick Formation. Diabase is a dark gray to black, fine grained and very dense, consisting of primarily labradorite and augite.

== Crossings and Bridges ==
Crossing	NBI Number	Length	Lanes	Spans	Material/Design	Built	Reconstructed	Latitude	Longitude
Lonely Cottage Road	-	-	-	-	-	-	-	-	-
Lonely Cottage Road	7624	7 metres (23 ft)	2	1	Steel stringer/multi-beam or girder	1961	-	40°32'5.1"N	75°7'38.2"W
Strocks Grove Road	7571	7 metres (23 ft)	1	1	Concrete tee-beam	1920	-	40°31'11"N	75°8'4"W
Rocky Ridge Road	7623	7 metres (23 ft)	2	1	Steel stringer/multi-beam or girder	1980	-	40°30'55.3"N	75°8'18.1"W
Byers Road	7569	14 metres (46 ft)	1	2	Concrete tee-beam	1912	1980	40°30'18.4"N	75°8'23.1"W
Beaver Run Road	-	-	-	-	-	-	-	-	-
Clay Ridge Road	7566	12 metres (39 ft)	1	1	Concrete arch-deck	1909	-	40°29'3.6"N	75°8'38.75"W

== See also ==
- List of rivers of the United States
- List of rivers of Pennsylvania
- List of Delaware River tributaries
