= Brooks Resources =

American real estate development company

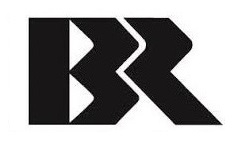
- Brooks Resources logo
- Company type: Public
- Industry: Real estate development
- Predecessor: Brooks-Scanlon Lumber Company
- Founded: 1969; independent corporation 1979
- Headquarters: Bend, Oregon, US
- Key people: Mike Hollern, board chairman
- Website: www.brooksresources.com

Brooks Resources is a real estate development company with significant land holdings in Central Oregon, United States. The company was formed in 1969 as a subsidiary of Brooks-Scanlon Lumber Company. It became an independent corporation in 1979. Brooks Resources develops residential neighborhoods, vacation rental properties, commercial complexes, and mixed-use communities. The company headquarters is located in Bend, Oregon.

== Brooks-Scanlon Lumber Company ==
The Brooks-Scanlon Lumber Company was founded in 1901. The founding partners were Michael J. Scanlon, Anson S. Brooks, Dwight F. Brooks, Lester R. Brooks, and Henry E. Gibson. The newly formed company had its headquarters in Minneapolis, Minnesota with a large milling facility near Cloquet, Minnesota.

Beginning in 1906, Brook-Scanlon started buying timber land in Florida. Two years later, the company began buying timber land in British Columbia as well. When standing timber in Minnesota became hard to find, the Cloquet mill was closed and the milling equipment was shipped west to a new mill site in British Columbia. In 1911, the company began looking at timber resources in central Oregon.

In 1915, the company purchased 250,000 acres (1,000 km^{2}) of timber land in central Oregon. The following year, Brooks-Scanlon opened a sawmill on the east bank of the Deschutes River on the outskirts of Bend. Within a year of opening, the Brooks-Scanlon sawmill was one of the two largest producers of pine lumber in the world. Over the following decades, Brooks-Scanlon bought additional tracts of central Oregon timber land from other forest land owners.

== Real estate development ==
In 1969, Brooks-Scanlon created a subsidiary corporation called Brooks Resources. The new company was created to develop Brooks-Scanlon property for uses other than timber production. The first project undertaken by Brooks Resources was the development Black Butte Ranch, begun in 1970. Black Butte Ranch is located just off U. S. Route 20, west of Sisters, Oregon. That project was followed by the Mount Bachelor Village resort in 1974. However, when the international oil crisis drove up fuel prices in the mid-1970s, recreational travel became very expensive. As a result, Brooks Resources offered everyone who had purchased property at Mount Bachelor Village the opportunity to cancel their purchase contracts. Every buyer but one took advantage of the cancellation offer. Once oil prices stabilized, property sales at Mount Bachelor Village picked up again and the project was completed as planned.

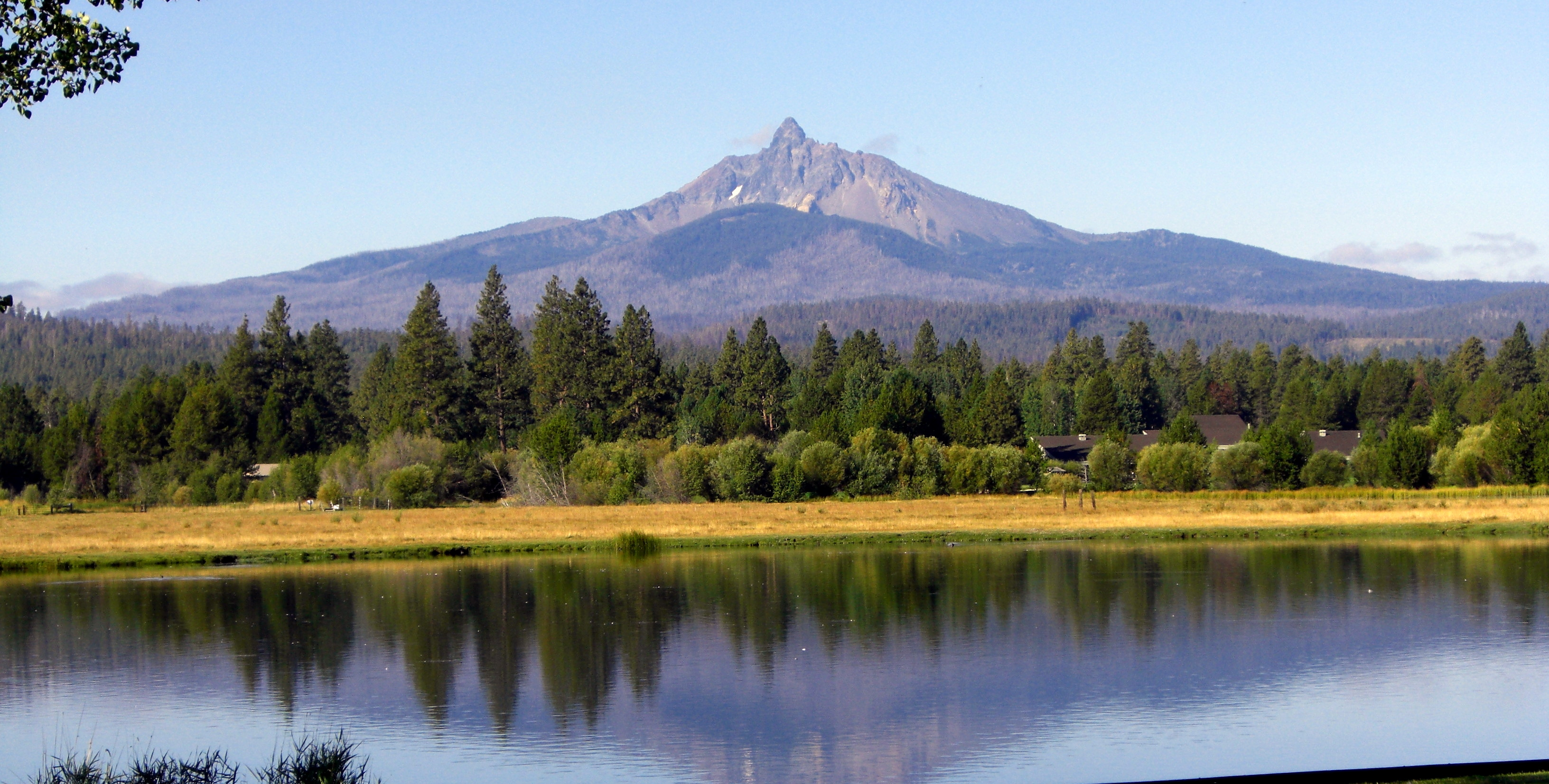
View of Black Butte Ranch resort landscape

In 1979, Brooks Resources was officially separated from the Brooks-Scanlon company. In the 1980s, Brooks Resources started two new projects, Shevlin Center begun in 1981 and their Awbrey Butte development that broke ground in 1984. Shevlin Center was a 205-acre (83 ha) office and light industry park located on the site of the old Shevlin-Hixon sawmill. Eventually, the Shevlin Center area included the Les Schwab Amphitheater and significant public space along the river. In addition, Black Butte Ranch and Mount Bachelor Village remained profitable during that period. Nevertheless, Brooks Resources lost money on its operations. In 1982 alone, the company lost $8.7 million, reducing the company's equity by approximately one third. Significant losses continued into 1983.

Eventually, the business recovered. Starting in the early 1990s, Brooks Resources' equity began growing ten percent a year. This was helped by projects like the Awbrey Glen golf community begun in 1993 and Shevlin RiverFront, a 1996 project. The Mount Bachelor Village conference center was built in 1999 and Century Washington Center was developed in 2000. Finally, the joint venture NorthWest Crossing mixed-use community was started in 1999 and began selling homes in 2002.

In 2004, the company moved its headquarters to a new location in downtown Bend.

In 2006, Brooks Resources began developing a mix-use community called Yarrow on a 900 acres (360 ha) site near Madras, Oregon. However, work on the Yarrow site was curtailed when a major economic recession hit central Oregon in 2008. Local real estate prices did not begin to recover until 2013. During this period, Brooks Resources remained the area's largest real estate development company. Nevertheless, the company turned over Awbrey Butte common lands to an owners' association in 2008 and sold its Awbrey Glen assets to home owners in that development the following year. Brooks Resources sold its Yarrow property to the Bean Foundation in 2015.

In 2018, the company sold its Mount Bachelor Village assets to the Oksenholt Companies.

== Business model ==
Brooks Resources has been a leading real estate developer in central Oregon for more than 50 years. Today, the company develops mixed-use communities, resort rental properties, and residential neighborhoods throughout central Oregon. It also sells homesites and other properties through its Brooks Resources Realty offices. Beginning in 2017, the company began offering real estate development services for private clients.

In 2019, the company began looking for opportunities to develop smaller urban parcels as well as large-tract projects while still focusing its business in central Oregon.

Brooks Resources maintains its headquarters in Bend, Oregon. The company has a track record of working with local governments to effectively plan and control growth while meeting community housing and commercial development needs. The company is also known for its commitment to preserving the natural environment as part of its project designs. Its projects typically include natural areas, walking trails, parks, and other public spaces built into environmentally friendly neighborhoods and community-based retail centers.

== Philanthropy and awards ==
The Bend Foundation is a non-profit organization founded by the Brooks-Scanlon Lumber Company in 1947 to help injured loggers and sawmill workers. Today, Brooks Resources remains a major contributor to the Foundation which currently supports a wide range of community institutions and philanthropic programs throughout central Oregon. The Foundation funds scholarships, public artwork, and a wide variety of other community programs and environmental projects. Brooks Resources often joins forces with the Foundation to increase the impact of their gifts. For example, in 2017, the Bend Foundation gave Oregon State University – Cascades $500,000 for a new math, science, technology, and engineering building and Brooks Resources gave a separate $75,000 gift for the same purpose.

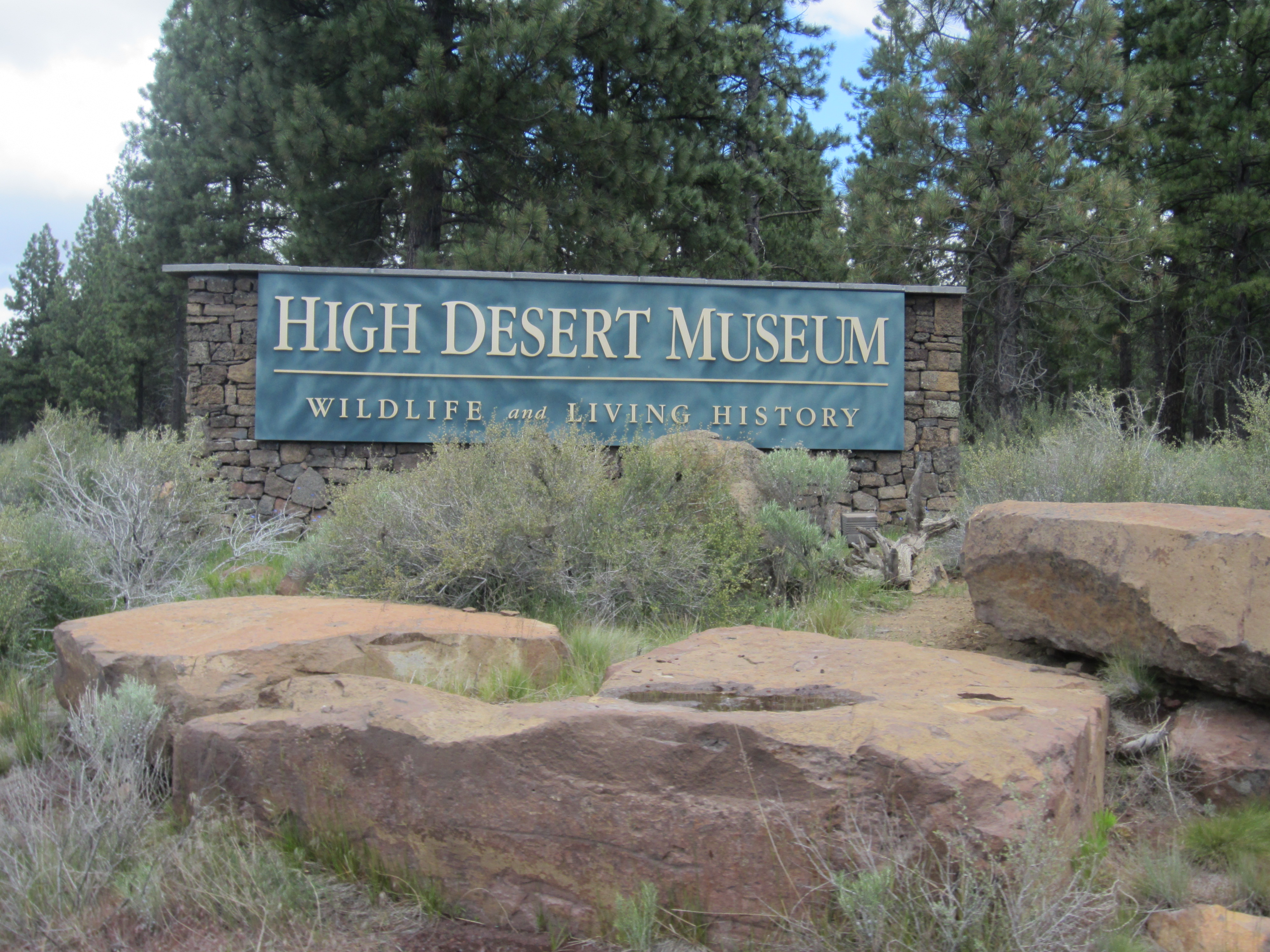
BR donated land for the High Desert Museum

In 1982, Brooks Resources helped Donald M. Kerr establish the High Desert Museum, south of Bend. The company donated 135 acres (55 ha) of forest land along U.S. Route 97 as the location for the museum. Over the years, Brooks Resources has continued to support the museum. In April 2019, Brooks Resources celebrated its 50th business anniversary at the museum. To celebrate, the company subsidized a community appreciation day with free admission for everyone visiting the museum.

Today, Brooks Resources gives a minimum of 3 percent of its pre-tax profits to local charities designated by an employee-led committee. Among the local institutions that have benefited from this giving program are the High Desert Museum, Bethlehem Inn (a shelter for homeless families), the BendFilm Festival, Bend's Art on Public Places project, the historic Tower Theatre, and Oregon State University – Cascades. In addition, when Brooks Resources began developing its North Rim homes project, it contributed two percent of the homesite sales revenue to the Oregon Community Foundation to help improve the Deschutes River watershed. Over the course of the project, approximately $1 million was contributed to Foundation watershed projects.

The Brooks companies have been working with the Bend community on park and recreation programs since the 1920s, when Brooks-Scanlon donated 1,000 acres (400 ha) to the City of Bend to establish Shevlin Park. More recent, Brooks Resources helped fund a riverway study along the Deschutes River corridor that identified 54 projects needed to complete the river trail network. The company has also donated a number of undeveloped properties to the Bend Park and Recreation District that are now Compass Park, Rim Rock Natural Area, Archie Briggs Canyon Natural Area, and Tree Farm (a 312-acre (126 ha) addition to Shevlin Park).

As of 2019, the company was working with the park district to expand Discovery Park in the NorthWest Crossing neighborhood. In addition, Brooks Resources worked with the City of Bend to improve its traffic roundabouts, providing company resources to landscape and add public artwork to 20 city roundabouts.

As a result of the long-term partnership between Brooks Resources and the Bend Park and Recreation District, the Oregon Recreation and Parks Association recognized Brooks Resources with its 2017 Private Sector Partner Award. The partner award honors an Oregon-based corporation or non-profit organization that has made a significant contribution to community parks and recreation programs.

== Development projects ==
Brooks Resources has developed a number of projects in central Oregon. Those projects include:

- Black Butte Ranch resort, 1970
- Mount Bachelor Village resort, 1974
- Shevlin Center commercial area, 1981
- Awbrey Butte homes, 1984
- Awbrey Glen golf community, 1993
- Shevlin RiverFront homes, 1996
- Mount Bachelor Village conference center, 1999
- NorthWest Crossing community (joint venture), 1999
- Century Washington Center commercial office park, 2000
- Awbrey Park homes, 2003
- North Rim homes, 2004
- RiverWild homes, 2004
- IronHorse mixed-use community, 2006
- Shevlin Health and Wellness Center (joint venture), 2014
- Tree Farm homes, 2016

== See also ==
- Black Butte Ranch, Oregon
- Real estate development
