= Bend Park & Recreation District =

Municipal agency in Bend, Oregon

Agency overview
- Jurisdiction: Oregon
- Website: www.bendparksandrec.org

The Bend Park & Recreation District is the agency which protects the parks, natural areas, recreational facilities, gardens, and trails of the city of Bend, Oregon.

== History ==
Bend formed a recreation department and hired its first director in April 1949. Before then, summer youth activities were organized jointly with the local school district. Sites were maintained by the public works department until 1964 when the maintenance and recreation programs combined to form a new Parks and Recreation Department.

== Sites ==
As of 2011, the agency operates 74 parks/open spaces and 56 miles (90 km) of trail, including:

- Al Moody – 2225 NE Daggett Lane
- Alpine – SW Swarens Ave./Century Drive
- Awbrey Village – 3015 NE Merchant Way
- Bend Senior Center – 1600 SE Reed Market Road
- Big Sky Park – Luke Damon Sports Complex – 21690 NE Neff Road
- Blakely Park – 1155 SW Brookswood Blvd.
- Boyd Park – 20750 NE Comet St
- Brooks Park – 35 NW Drake Road
- Columbia Park – 264 SW Columbia Street
- Compass Park – 2500 NW Crossing Drive
- Davis Park Site – Revere Street (end)
- Deschutes River Trail
- District Office – 799 SW Columbia Street
- Dohema River Access – NW Drake and Dohema Streets
- Drake Park and Mirror Pond – 777 NW Riverside Blvd.
- Farewell Bend Park – 1000 SW Reed Market Road
- First Street Rapids Park – West First and Vicksburg Streets
- Foxborough Park – 61308 Sunflower Lane
- Gardenside Park – 61750 Darla Place
- Harmon Park – 1100 NW Harmon Road
- Harvest Park – 63240 Lavacrest St.
- High Desert Park Site – Knott Road/27th
- Hillside I Park – 2050 NW 12th Street
- Hillside II Park – 910 NW Saginaw Avenue
- Hixon Park – 125 SW Crowell Way
- Hollinshead Park – 1235 NE Jones Rd
- Hollygrape Park – 19489 SW Hollygrape Street
- Jaycee Park – 478 Railroad Street
- Juniper Park – 800 NE 6th
- Juniper Swim & Fitness Center – 800 NE 6th St.
- Kiwanis Park – 800 SE Centennial Blvd.
- Larkspur Park – 1700 SE Reed Market Road
- Larkspur Trail – 1600 SE Reed Market Road
- Lewis & Clark Park – 2520 NW Lemhi Pass Drive
- McKay Park – 166 SW Shevlin Hixon Drive
- Mountain View Park – 1975 NE Providence Drive
- Orchard Park – 2001 NE 6th Street
- Overturf Park – 475 NW 17th Street
- Pacific Park – 200 NW Pacific Park Lane
- Pageant Park – 691 Drake Road
- Park Services Center – 1675 SW Simpson
- Pilot Butte Neighborhood Park – 1310 NE Highway 20
- Pine Nursery Park – 3750 NE Purcell Blvd.
- Pine Ridge Park – 61250 Linfield Ct
- Pine Tree Park Site – Intersection of Purcell Street and Empire Ave.
- Pioneer Park – 1525 Wall Street
- Ponderosa Park – 225 SE 15th Street
- Providence Park – 1055 NE Providence Drive
- Quail Park – 2755 NW Regency Street
- River Canyon Park – 61005 Snowbrush Drive
- River Rim Park Site – River Rim Drive
- Riverbend Park – 799 SW Columbia Street
- Riverview Park – 225 NE Division Street
- Rock Ridge Park Site – NE 18th Street
- Sawyer Park – 62999 O.B. Riley Road
- Sawyer Uplands Park – 700 NW Yosemite Drive
- Shevlin Park – 18920 Shevlin Park Road
- Skyline Sports Complex – 19617 Mountaineer Way
- Stover Park – 1650 NE Watson Drive
- Summit Park – 1150 NW Promontory Drive
- Sun Meadow Park – 61150 Dayspring Drive
- Sunset View Park – 990 Stannium Street
- Sylvan Park – 2996 NW Three Sisters Drive
- Three Pines Park – 19089 Mt Hood Place
- Tillicum Park/Chase Ranch – 18144 Couch Market Road
- Vince Genna Stadium – SE 5th and Roosevelt Avenue
- Wildflower Park – 60955 River Rim Drive
- Woodriver Park – 61690 Woodriver Drive

== See also ==
- Bend Whitewater Park
