= Thomas McCann House =

Historic house in Oregon, United States

- U.S. National Register of Historic Places
- U.S. Historic district – Contributing property
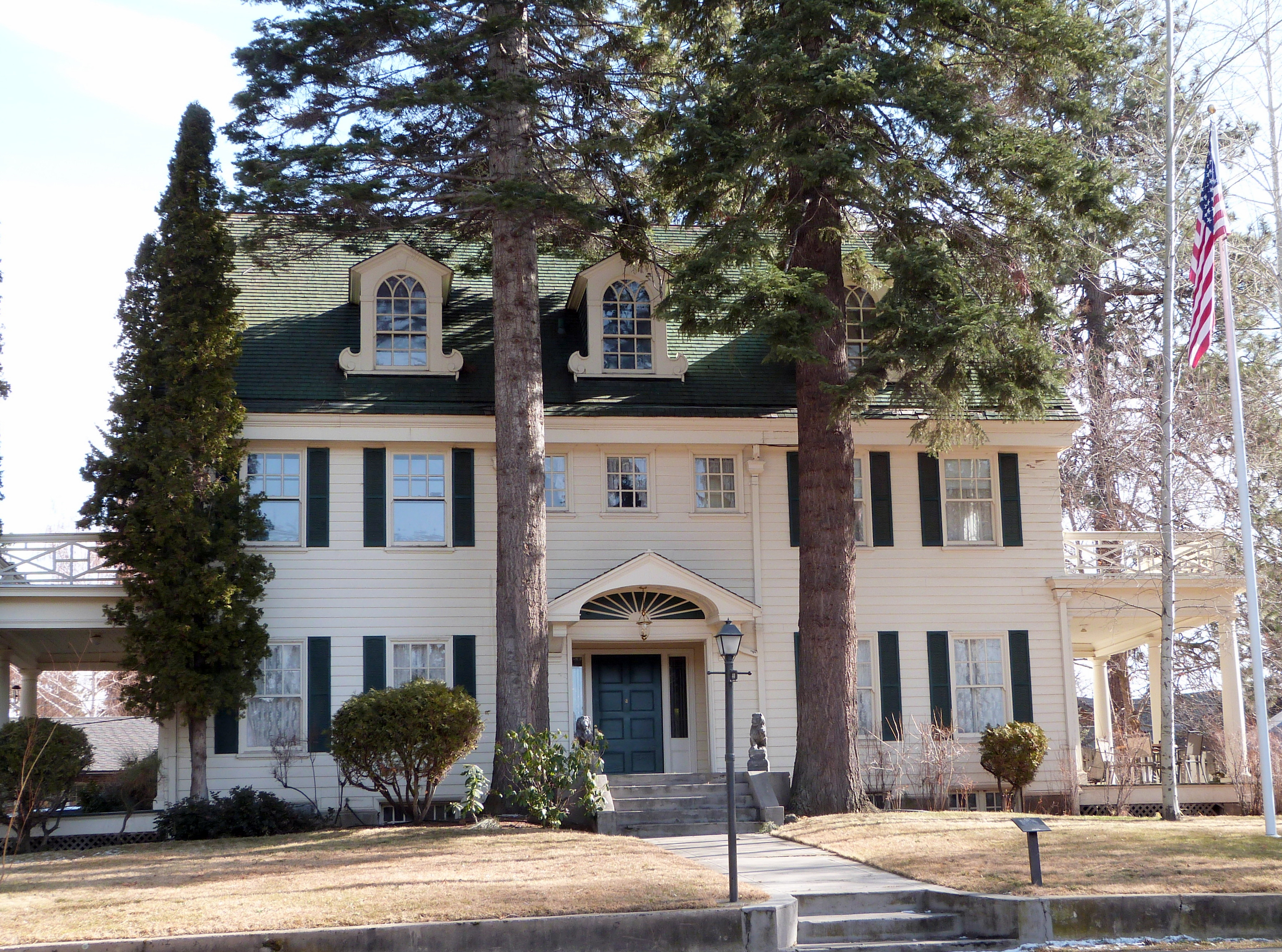
- The McCann House in 2013.

- Location within Oregon
- Location: 440 NW Congress Street; Bend, Oregon
- Coordinates: 44°03′24″N 121°19′11″W
- Area: less than one acre
- Built: 1915
- Architect: David C. Lewis
- Architectural style: Georgian Revival
- Part of: Drake Park Neighborhood Historic District (ID05000380)
- NRHP reference No.: 80003311
- Added to NRHP: April 1, 1980

The Thomas McCann House, also known as the General Manager's House for Shevlin-Hixon Lumber Company, is a historic home in Bend, Oregon. It is located at 440 NW Congress Street and was listed on the National Register of Historic Places in 1980.
