= Alexander M. Drake =

- Alexander M. Drake, 1900
- Born: January 11, 1859; Xenia, Ohio United States
- Died: October 8, 1934 (aged 75); Pasadena, California
- Occupation: Businessman
- Known for: Founder of Bend, Oregon
- Spouse: Florence W. Drake

Alexander McClurg Drake (January 11, 1859 – October 8, 1934) was a Minnesota investor and Oregon pioneer. He was the founder of Bend, Oregon.

Drake was born on January 11, 1859, in Xenia, Ohio. He was the second son of Caroline Matilda McClurg and Elias Franklin Drake, who was involved with the railroad business. Elias Franklin Drake also served in the Ohio House of Representatives and the Minnesota Senate. Drake grew up in Saint Paul, Minnesota. Drake, reacting to the 1893 Panic, traveled in a covered wagon with his wife, Florence (Ada Florence Williams), arriving to what was called "Farewell Bend" in June 1900. Mrs. Drake's love of the area's natural beauty, "the majestic Cascades to the West and the Deschutes River in the foreground" is said to be responsible for the selection of the site on which Bend now stands.

Their home, the Drake Lodge, was built upon the spot now part of the Masonic Lodge in the center of Bend, which developed around the Drake's property. Drake was owner of the first sawmill in Bend and saw the irrigation potential of the area. Drake formed the Pilot Butte Development Company on October 18, 1900. He platted the streets of Bend and was organizer in the Central Oregon irrigation project that was assigned the first land under the Carey Act segregation, building the Central Oregon Canal and Pilot Butte Canal which later led to the Bend area population boom from rapid agricultural development. Drake founded the Deschutes Water, Light and Power Company in 1909 and built the dam and original wooden powerhouse on the Deschutes River.

On November 2, 1910, the first electricity was provided to the business district (with intentions to later expand to the residential areas) through five miles of power lines on 85 poles throughout Bend. At that time, 375 lights had been installed and 125 further were contracted for connection to electrical power that was available from 4:30 p.m. to midnight and from 4 to 8 am. Drake sold his holdings just a few months before his power project was completed, however his original turbines and generators still produce the power for part of Bend's downtown at the same 100-year-old Bend power plant, now owned by Pacific Power.

The Alexander Drake Building at 250 NW Franklin Avenue in Bend was built in 2001, a three-and-a-half-story 32,000 square foot office building designed by BBT architects and Froelich Consulting Engineers, Inc., is named after Mr. Drake. Drake Park is also named after him. Wall Street, one of Bend's core roads, is named after the stone fence along the east side of the Drake property now part of Drake Park Neighborhood Historic District.
