= Drake Park Neighborhood Historic District =

Historic district in Oregon, United States

- U.S. National Register of Historic Places
- U.S. Historic district
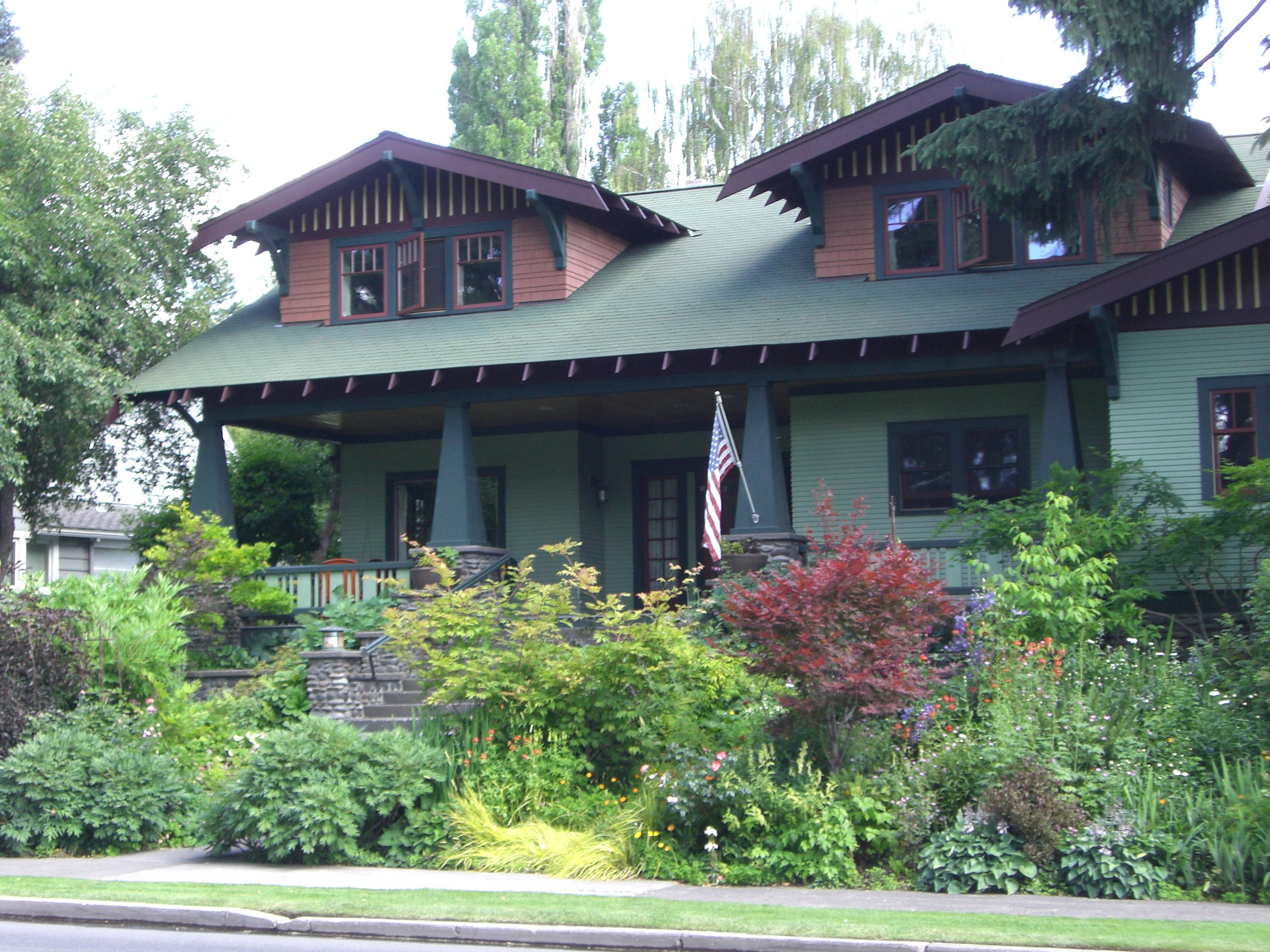
- Residence on Riverside Boulevard in 2008.

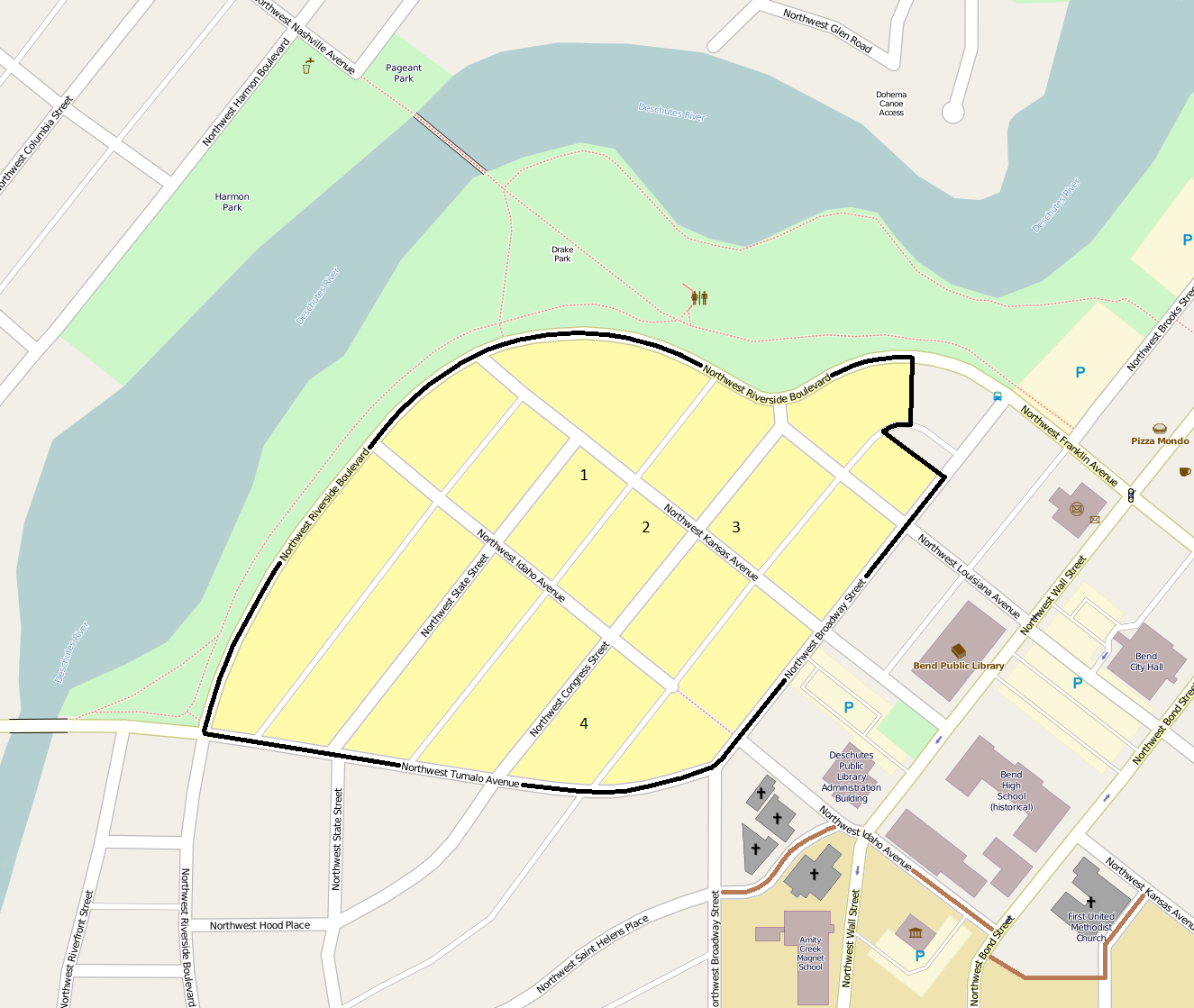
- The historic district boundaries in Bend.
- Location: Bend, Oregon, USA
- Coordinates: 44°03′28″N 121°19′11″W
- Built: 1910–1954
- Architect: J.W. Dimick and David C. Lewis
- Architectural style: American Craftsman and 13 other styles
- NRHP reference No.: 05000380
- Added to NRHP: June 3, 2005

The Drake Park Neighborhood Historic District is located adjacent to Drake Park near the historic downtown area in Bend, Oregon, United States. Because of the unique and varied architecture in the Drake Park neighborhood and its close association with the early development of the city of Bend, the area was listed on the National Register of Historic Places in 2005.

== Location ==
The Drake Park Neighborhood Historic District is located in Bend, Oregon. It includes 17 city blocks with 83 individual residential lots. The streets that constitute the boundaries of the district are Riverside Boulevard on the north and west next to Drake Park; Tumalo Avenue on the south; Broadway Street on the southeast; and Franklin Avenue on the northeast corner.

The district is 3,623 feet (1,104 m) above sea level. The area is relatively flat, sloping gently to the west towards the Deschutes River which runs through Drake Park. Large Ponderosa Pine trees are scattered throughout the district. Many retaining walls and other landscape elements in the neighborhood are made of local basalt fieldstone.

== History ==
In 1910, Alexander M. Drake, owner of the Pilot Butte Development Company, subdivided the land that is now Drake Park Neighborhood Historic District into residential lots. The area was laid out south of a curving boulevard that followed the Deschutes River. Lots in the subdivision originally sold for $100 to $250, equivalent to $3500 to $8600 today. In 1921, 11 acres (45,000 m^{2}) along the river, adjacent to the subdivision, were sold to the city of Bend to create Drake Park. That same year, State Street was the third street in Bend to be paved.

The spacious lots were considered highly desirable because they were close to Drake Park, which runs along the east side of the Deschutes River. In addition, many home sites had choice views of the Cascade Mountain peaks. The area was only a block away from Bend's downtown business district so the city hall, public library, and local Catholic, Methodist, and Episcopalian churches were within easy walking distance. The district was also within walking distance of the Brooks-Scanlon and Shevlin-Hixon lumber mills. As a result, the Drake Park district quickly became the preferred neighborhood for the city's most prominent businessmen.

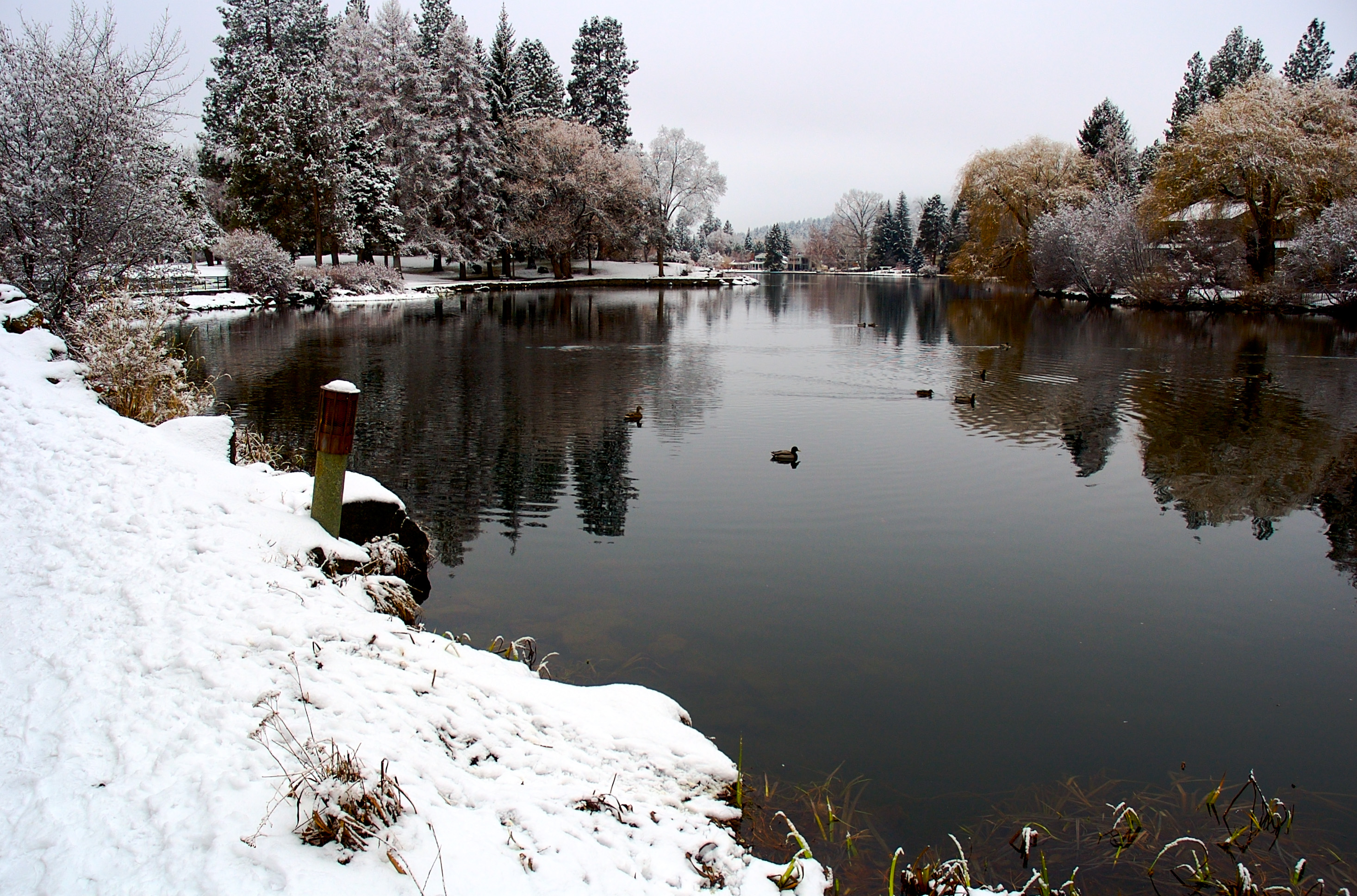
Mirror Pond from Drake Park along the Deschutes River.

Over the years, residents of the district included many prominent business and civic leaders who contributed to the development of the city of Bend and helped make it the commercial hub of central Oregon. The residents included owners and managers of the city's large lumber mills; owners of downtown businesses, hotels, and other enterprises; and professional men and women. In addition, many of the city's mayors, city council members, and Deschutes County commissioners lived in the neighborhood.

With the exception of three houses, all the homes in the historic district were built between 1910 and 1954. The homes in the Drake Park Neighborhood Historic District are unique, and the area's development parallels the growth of Bend as the city grew from 536 people in 1910 to over 11,000 in 1950. As a result, the Drake Park neighborhood was listed on the National Register of Historic Places in 2005.

== Architecture ==
There are 110 contributing structures on 83 residential lots within the boundary of the Drake Park Neighborhood Historic District. The district has an unusually high concentration of diverse architecture with unique cultural value. The neighborhood also has maintained its architectural integrity with eighty-one percent of the homes and sixty-five percent of the non-residential structures contributing to its historic value.

Most of the houses built between 1910 and 1919 are American Craftsman style homes. In the early 1920s, a number of American Colonial style homes were built in the neighborhood; however, Craftsman-style homes continued to be popular as well. Beginning around 1925, other architectural styles were introduced to the neighborhood, including Tudor, English Cottage, Cape Cod, Dutch Colonial, and [[Spanish Colonial Revival Style architecture|Spanish Villa]] designs. During the 1930s very few homes were built, but those that were reflected a variety of tastes. In the 1940s, the residents tended to favor more modern designs. The last two historic homes, both built in the 1950s, are a California Ranch style design and a post-war modern tract house. Since 1954, the neighborhood has remained relatively stable and has retained its architectural integrity. A total of fourteen architectural styles are represented in the district.

Four houses within the district are previously listed on the National Register of Historic Places. The George Palmer and Dorothy Binney Putnam House that was purchased by George Palmer Putnam and his wife Dorothy Binney Putnam in 1912; it was named to the register of historic places in 1998. The other three houses are the Thomas McCann House, the Robert D. Moore House, and the Benjamin Hamilton House. The Putnam house, built in 1911, is an American Craftsman style home located on Congress Street. The McCann house is also on Congress Street. It is a Georgian Revival style home built in 1915. The McCann house was designed by David C. Lewis, a prominent Portland architect who also designed the European Building for the 1905 Lewis and Clark Exposition. The Moore house is a Colonial Revival style home built on Congress Street in 1921. The Hamilton house, on State Street, is a one-story Craftsman-style bungalow built in 1923.

There are a number of other distinguished homes in the district including the John and Jennie Keyes House, built in 1913. It is a two-story Craftsman style home located on Riverside Boulevard. The home was designed by Bend's most prominent architect of the time, J. W. Dimick. The James and Ruth Overturf House was built in 1916. It is another craftsman style bungalow located on Congress Street. In 2002, the house was carefully restored to its original architectural design. The Samuel Blakely House was built in 1919. It is a restored Craftsman bungalow located on Congress Street. Finally, the Fredrick and Myrtle Lieuallen House on Riverside Boulevard is a beautiful Tudor-style home built in 1926.

== See also ==
- National Register of Historic Places listings in Deschutes County, Oregon
