= Pine Tavern =

Coordinates: 44.0600°N 121.3141°W

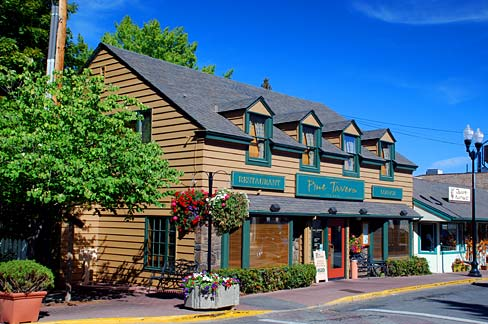
- Pine Tavern, founded in 1936
- Interactive map of Pine Tavern

Restaurant information
- Established: 1936
- Owner: William McCormick
- Food type: American
- Dress code: Casual
- Location: Bend, Oregon, United States
- Website: www.pinetavern.com

The Pine Tavern is a restaurant in Bend, Oregon, United States. Opened in 1936, the restaurant is located in downtown Bend and is one of the city's best known landmarks. The main dining room was built around two large ponderosa pine trees for which the restaurant is named. Both the main dining room and the restaurant's outdoor garden dining area overlook the Deschutes River. Today, the Pine Tavern is the oldest restaurant in the city of Bend.

== History ==
In 1919, Maren Gribskov and Eleanor Bechen opened a restaurant in downtown Bend called the O.I.C Cafeteria. In 1936, the two partners decided to move to a new location overlooking Mirror Pond on the Deschutes River. They named the new restaurant the Pine Tavern because of two large ponderosa pine trees that grew in the middle of the restaurant's back patio.

Despite the economic hardships caused by the Great Depression, the Pine Tavern was a success, especially popular with local timber workers and their families. During World War II, the restaurant became popular with soldiers from nearby Camp Abbot. After the war, word-of-mouth recommendations brought tourists, travelers, and skiers to the Pine Tavern. In 1957, a major renovation expanded the dining area, incorporating the two giant pine trees into a new dining room. In 1967, the Pine Tavern was sold to Dallas "Tex" Carter, a retired furniture manufacturer from Tacoma, Washington.

In the early 1970s, Carter sold the restaurant to Winifred Roley. She operated the Pine Tavern for a decade before selling it to Bert Bender and Joe Cenarrusa in 1982. Bender was an experienced restaurateur, having operated well-known dining establishments in Sun Valley and Ketchum, Idaho, before taking over the Pine Tavern. In the 1990s, Bender and Cenarrusa redesigned the garden and patio dining area that overlooks the Deschutes River. Cenarrusa was killed in an airplane crash in 1997. However, Bender continued to operate the restaurant until his death in 2009.

After Bender died, his wife, Christine, and his daughter, Justine Bender Bennett, took charge of the Pine Tavern. In 2010, the front dining area was remodeled, removing a large booth and replacing it with tables to open up the interior space. In the following year, bathrooms were renovated and the interior was updated with new carpet and upholstery.

== Landmark ==
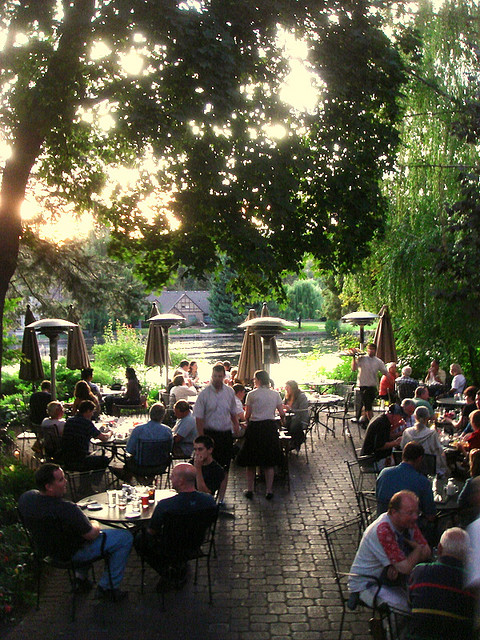
Garden patio overlooking Mirror Pond

The Pine Tavern is the oldest restaurant in the city of Bend. According to the Bend Bulletin newspaper, the restaurant's success is the result of its unique character, picturesque location, and long-standing reputation for good service and quality cuisine.

The two large ponderosa pines in the restaurant's main dining room give diners the feeling of being in an outdoor terrace with a view of the Deschutes River from large windows on three sides. The smaller of the two pine trees that are the centerpiece to the Pine Tavern's main dining room, was killed by mountain pine beetles in 1983. The lower part of that tree's trunk still rises through the dining room roof, giving the impression of a living tree. However, the upper part of the tree has been removed. The larger pine tree is estimated to be up to 300 years old. It is healthy and still rises through the roof of the main dining room to tower above the restaurant.

The Pine Tavern's garden overlooks Mirror Pond, an impoundment of the Deschutes River. The garden's brick patio is open for dining in the summer. The garden area is covered by maple and birch trees and landscaped with hostas and geraniums. There is also a large birdhouse built to look like the Pine Tavern in a corner of the garden. Dining in the garden area is very popular with both tourists and local guests.

Over the years, the Pine Tavern has been a popular venue for special events. It has hosted local civic groups, wedding receptions and anniversary dinners, political gatherings, museum fund raising events, and art shows. Because of its history and location on the Deschutes River, the Pine Tavern remains one of Bend's most popular restaurants.

== Menu ==
The Pine Tavern's menu is based on locally produced foods and ingredients. For example, the prime rib special and the flat iron steaks served at the restaurant are from Oregon Country Beef, a Central Oregon ranching operation that raises hormone-free cattle. One of their two fish dishes feature line-caught steelhead from the Columbia River. Pears, apples, and marionberries served in various dishes are from Pacific Northwest orchards and berry farms. As a result, the Pine Tavern's menu helps to support local ranchers and farmers as well as serving dinner guests. In addition, the homemade sourdough scones with honey butter, despite not featuring a local connection to the Pacific Northwest, have become a local institution, being served complimentary with meals since 1982.

== Location ==
The Pine Tavern is in downtown Bend, Oregon. It is at the end of Oregon Avenue with Brooks Street passing in front of the restaurant. The front of the Pine Tavern looks directly up Oregon Avenue while the back overlooks Mirror Pond.
