= Drake Park =

Park in Bend, Oregon

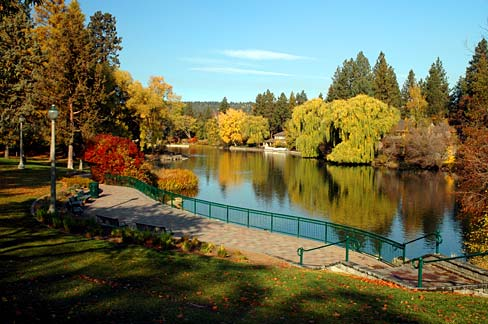
- Mirror Pond from Drake Park in the fall

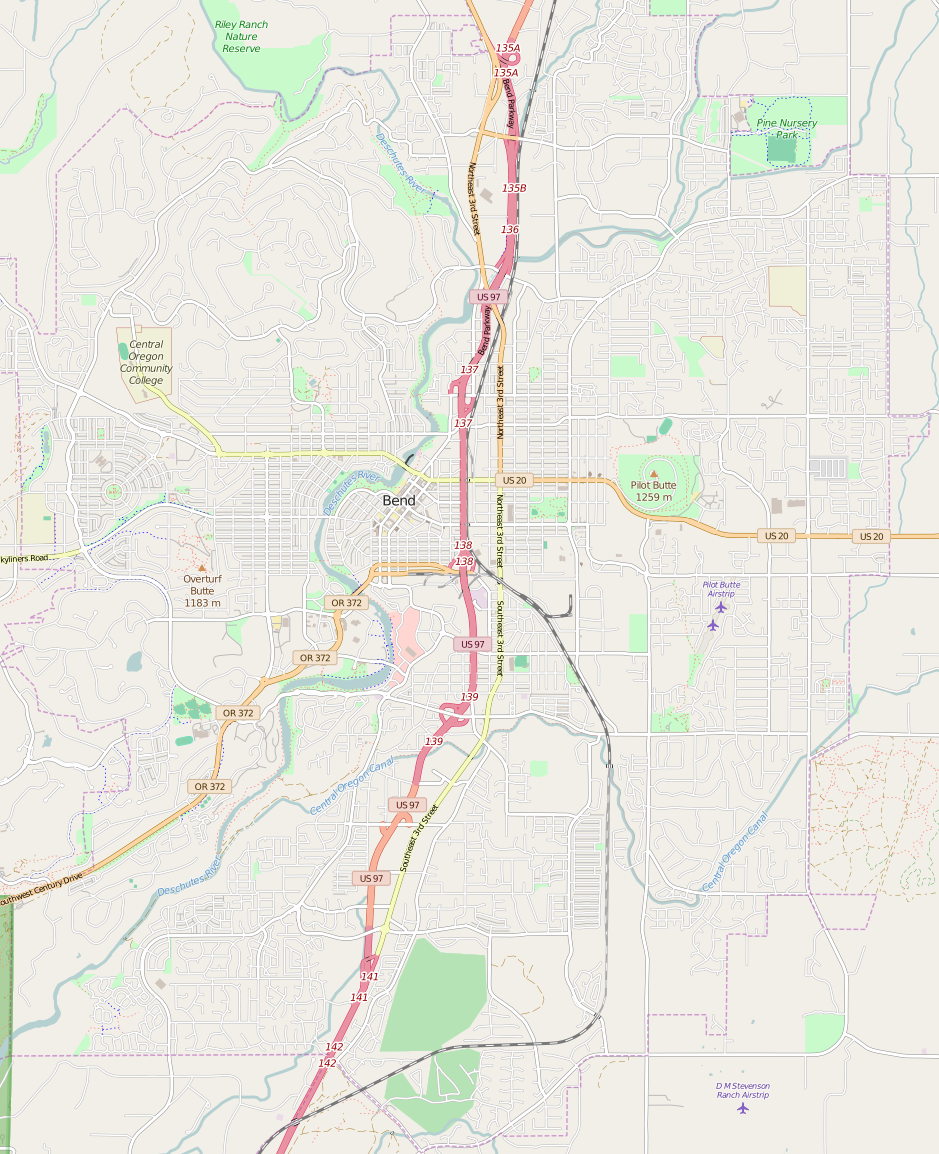
- Location within Bend OR Location within Oregon
- Location: 777 NW Riverside Blvd. Bend, Oregon, US
- Coordinates: 44.05965°N 121.32°W
- Area: 13 acres (5.3 ha)
- Created: 1921
- Operator: Bend Park & Recreation District

Drake Park is a 13-acre (5.3 ha) park in Bend, in the U.S. state of Oregon. It was named for Alexander M. Drake, the original owner of the site.

The park is a popular downtown community gathering place and hosts many events, including the Old Fashioned July 4th Celebration.

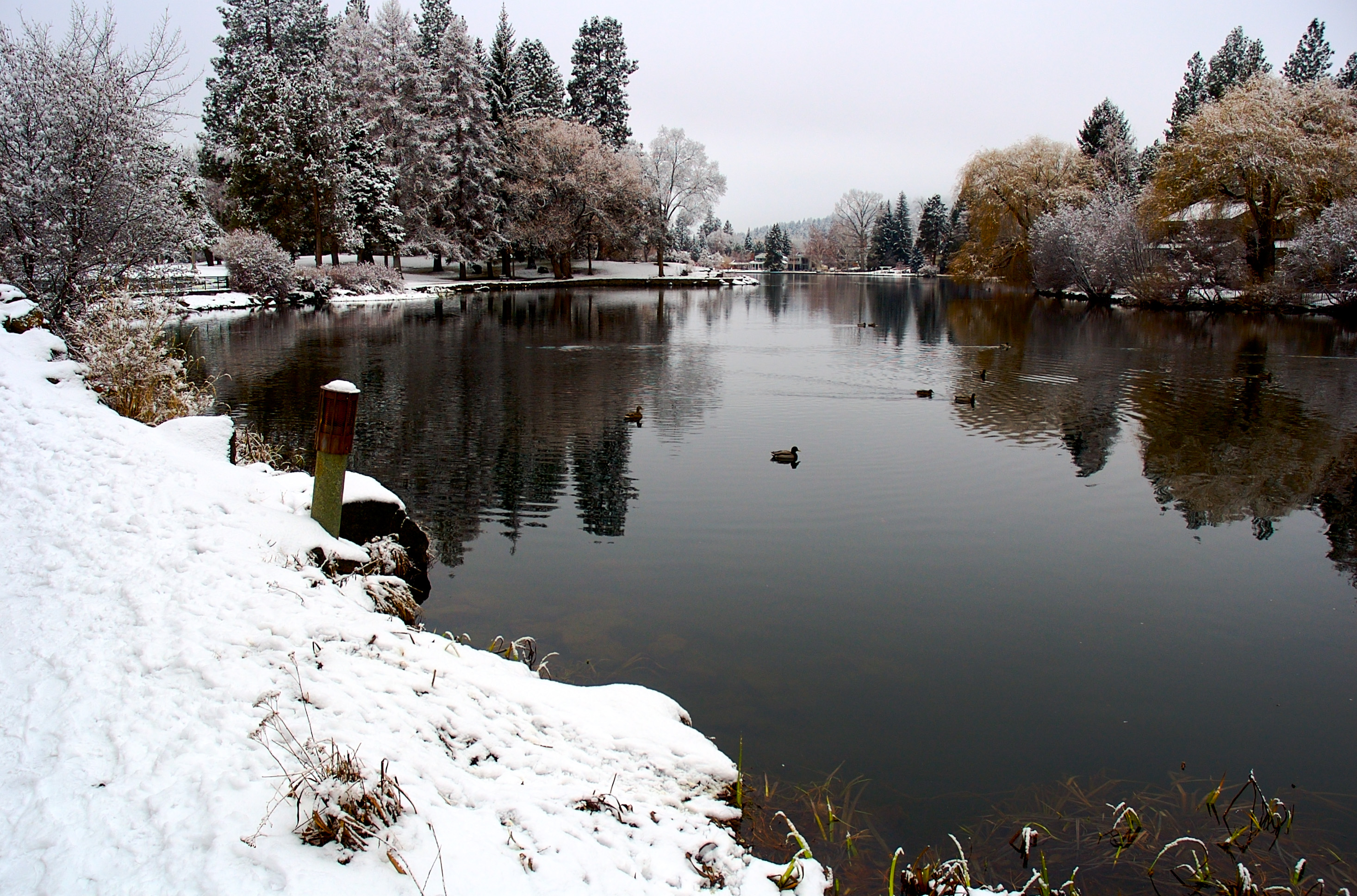
Mirror Pond from Drake Park in the winter

Features include nearly one half mile of riverfront on Mirror Pond, acres of open lawn, an outdoor stage, restrooms and small picnic tables.

A major renovation project for the park was completed in 2003. The restrooms were upgraded, pathways throughout the park were replaced with pavers making the walkway wider, new irrigation and lighting systems were installed, bike racks were installed, a seating and viewing area was added at Mirror Pond and the High Wheel returned to the park after years in storage.

Drake Park is in the Old Bend Neighborhood. Drake Park Neighborhood Historic District is adjacent to the park.
