= Farewell Bend Park =

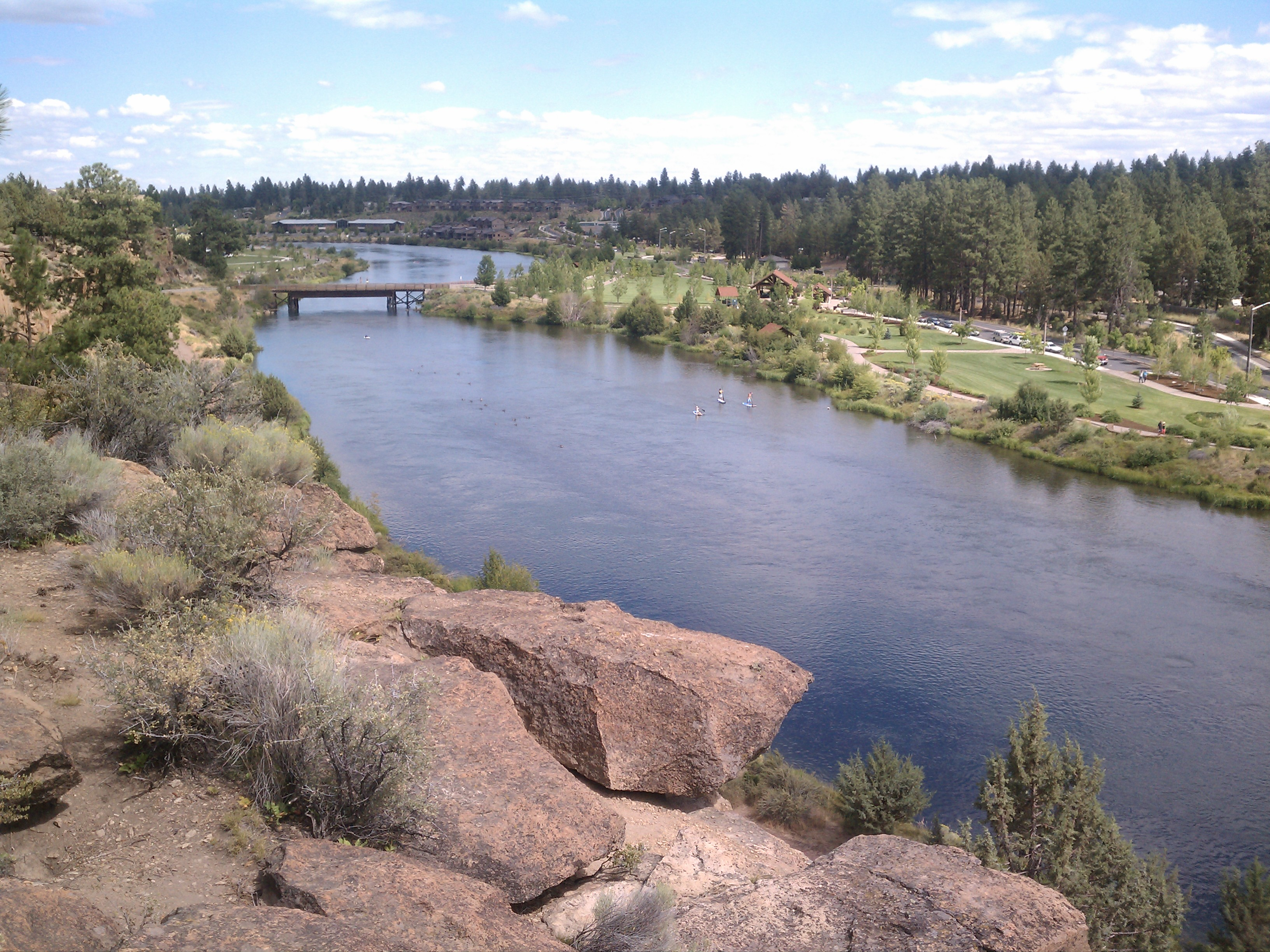
- The park in 2011

- Location within Oregon
- Location: Bend, Oregon, U.S.
- Coordinates: 44.0411386°N 121.3246087°W
- Area: 22 acres (8.9 ha)

Farewell Bend Park is a 22-acre (8.9 ha) park along the Deschutes River in Bend, Oregon, in the United States.
