= Tower Theatre (Bend, Oregon) =

Theater in Bend, Oregon, United States

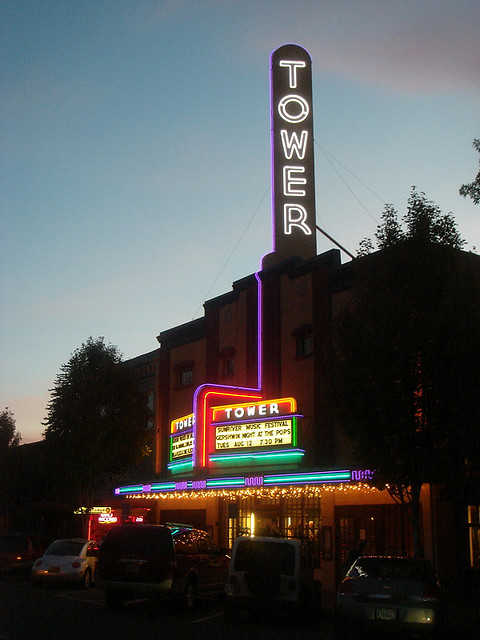
- Interactive map of Tower Theatre
- Address: 835 Wall Street
- Location: Bend, Oregon
- Coordinates: 44°03′32″N 121°18′53″W
- Owner: Tower Theatre Foundation
- Seating type: reserved
- Capacity: 480
- Type: Theatre

Construction
- Built: 1940 (three months)
- Opened: 1940
- Renovated: 2002

Website
- www.towertheatre.org

The Tower Theatre is a historic performing arts theatre located in Bend, Oregon, United States.

== History ==
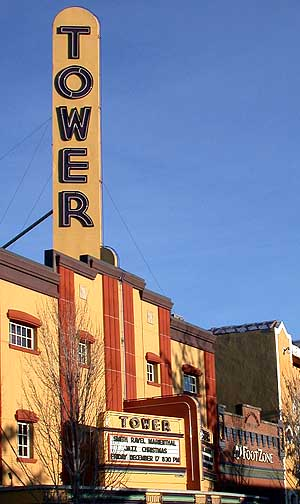
Historic Tower Theatre in downtown Bend

The Tower Theatre opened in 1940. The theatre's name on its landmark 40-foot-tall (12 m) tower is surrounded by more than 1,200 feet (370 m) of neon tubes of green and gold. Initially, the seating capacity of the theatre was 998 on two levels.

In order to provide a wide range of movies, four studios were contracted to provide material: Columbia, RKO, Monogram and Warner Bros. In 1948, the theatre began to host fashion shows, variety shows, an amateur hour and ballet.

The theatre was closed in 1993 due to competition from new multiplex movie theaters.

Initial plans called for a conversion into retail and office use. A first grass-roots effort was started by local individuals and the theatre put on nearly 100 shows from 1994–1996. In 1995, the City of Bend purchased the theatre, but failing to invest in renovations, had to close it down again in 1996.

In the fall of 1996, a second attempt to save the theatre was made. A group of 30 local people gathered feedback from the community and formed a board. In 1997, they approached the City of Bend for a purchase option. Their request was met with a challenge from the city to generate $300,000 of cash and in-kind pledges of support for the project. In July 1997, the Tower Theatre Foundation was founded as a non-profit, 501(c)(3) organization. Only a few weeks after the challenge by the city, the foundation had raised cash and in-kind pledges of $362,590. In 1999 a campaign called "Encore! The Return of the Tower Theatre" was launched to raise further funds. It showed later that a total of $4.2 million would be needed to restore the Tower. In 2001, the foundation purchased the Tower from the City of Bend.

Construction began in 2002. The interior space was to be expanded from 10,432 to 13,630 square feet (969.2 to 1,266.3 m^{2}): the basement was enlarged to accommodate an orchestra pit, new box seats were obtained, and the lobby area was expanded. Many local businesses pledged support by providing material, labor, and other resources in exchange for being recognized on plaques in the lobby area. A concession stand selling snacks and beverages (including beer and wine) was included in the design.

The Tower Theatre re-opened its doors in January 2004.
