= Shevlin Park =

Park in Bend, Oregon, U.S.

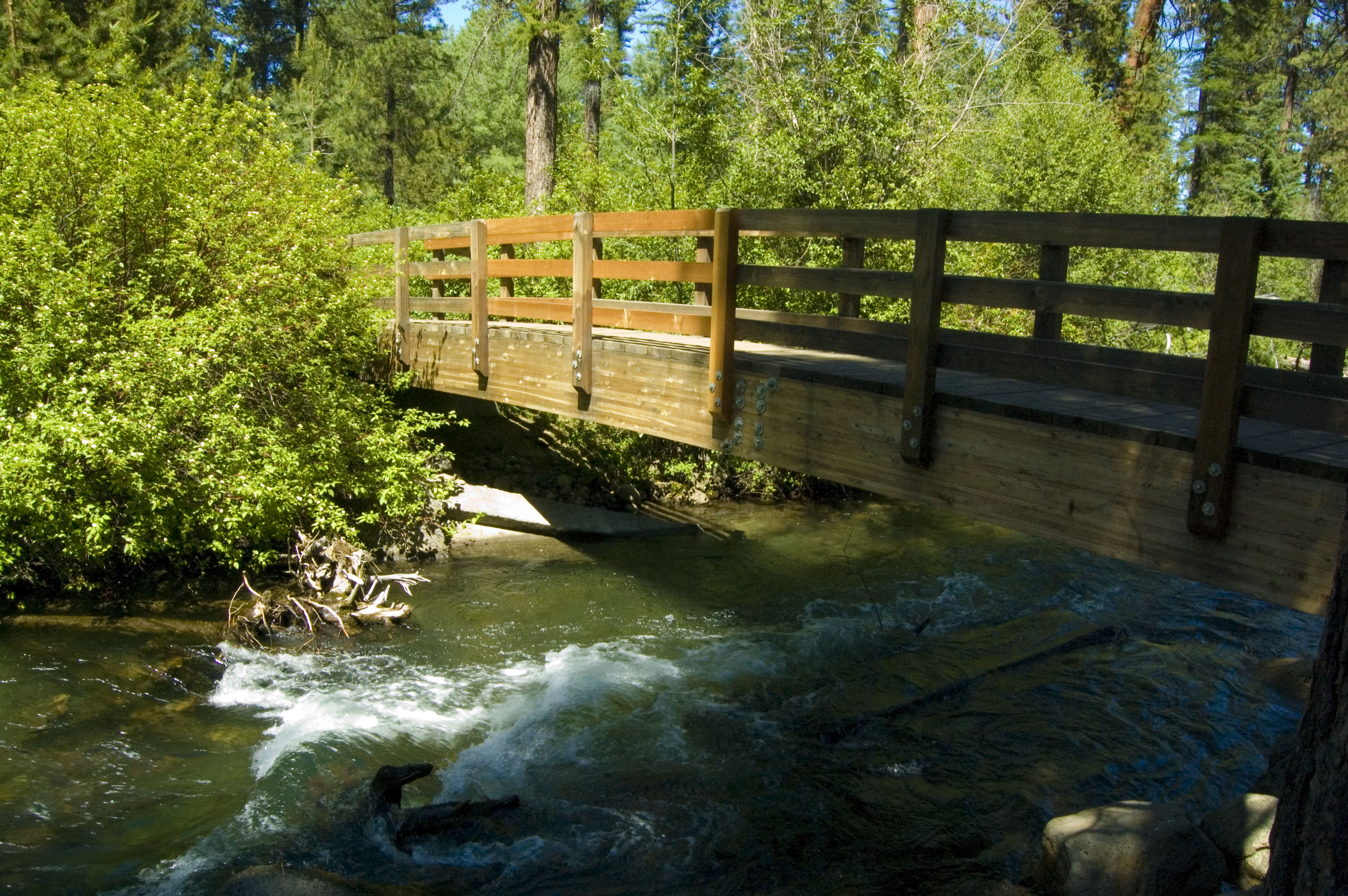
- Bridge over Tumalo Creek in the center of the park south of NW Shevlin Park Drive

- Location within Oregon
- Location: 18920 Northwest Shevlin Park Road, Bend, Oregon, U.S.
- Coordinates: 44.0832°N 121.3779°W
- Area: 981 acres (397 ha)
- Established: 1921
- Designated: Regional Park
- Hiking trails: Tumalo Creek Trail, Shevlin Loop Trail, Fremont Meadow Road, Shevlin Commons Trail, Historic Shevlin Railroad Trail, Service Road Trail
- Water: Tumalo Creek, Shevlin Pond

Shevlin Park is a 981 acres (397 ha) park located in Bend, Oregon. It was first established in 1921 by the City of Bend. Notable natural and manmade features include Tumalo Creek, Aspen Hall, and Fremont Meadow.

== History ==
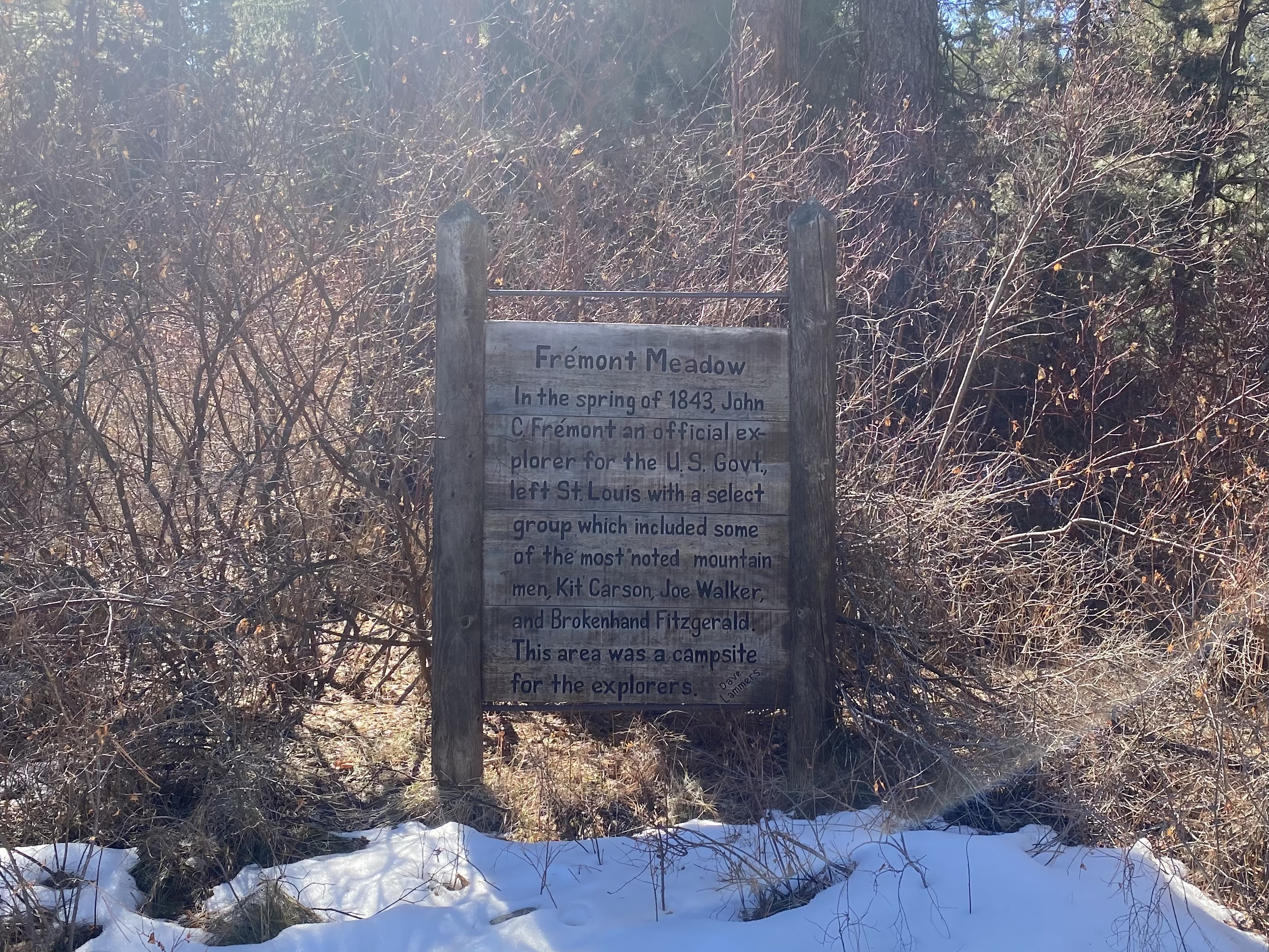
Sign marking John C. Frémont's campsite

John C. Frémont camped in what is now the southern area of the park in his 1843 expedition. The space where he and his men camped was dedicated to the explorer and named Fremont Meadow.

The City of Bend, Oregon, was founded in 1904, and lumber businessman Tom Shevlin donated the land to the city in 1919. The park was then established in 1921 by the City of Bend and named after the donor. It has been managed by the Bend Park and Recreation District since 1974. In 2019, Hixon Crossing Bridge located in the park was dismantled. The original abutments were constructed in 1917, and in the 1990s, the Walt Disney Company built walls and a roof over the bridge to feature it in the 1993 film Homeward Bound: The Incredible Journey. In 2018, the Bend Park and Recreation district decided the bridge was to be removed to improve the riparian and shoreline habitats, given that another bridge was only 500 feet (150 m) downstream.

== Recreation and events ==
Shevlin Park is popular for hiking, running, mountain biking, and cross country skiing. It has a network of trails that connect to other trail systems beyond the park. There is also Shevlin Pond, a fishing pond, in the northern portion of the park. Aspen Hall, an events space, is also located in that area north of NW Shevlin Park Drive. The park is open year-round and hosts summer camps for children through the Parks and Recreation district.
