= Mirror Pond =

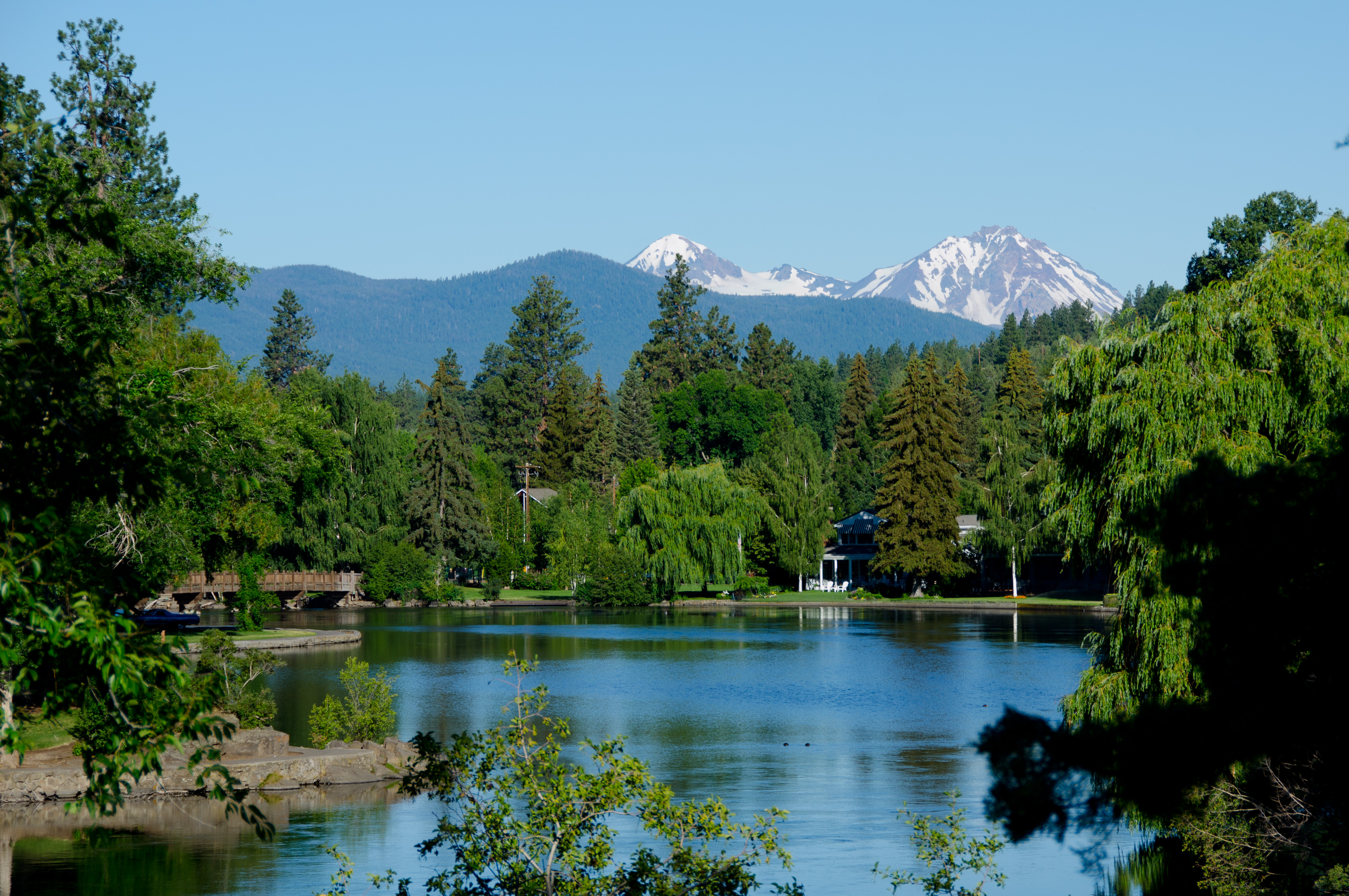
- Mirror Pond from "The Emblem" in the summer

- Location within Oregon Location within the United States
- Location: Bend, Oregon
- Coordinates: 44.06206°N 121.3142°W
- Type: reservoir
- Primary inflows: Deschutes River
- Primary outflows: Deschutes River
- Catchment area: 700,000 acres (280,000 ha)
- Basin countries: U.S.
- Built: 1910
- Max. length: 0.6 mi (1 km)
- Max. width: 400 ft (122 m)
- Surface elevation: 3,586 ft (1,093 m)
- Islands: 4 minor islands with trees

Mirror Pond is an impoundment of the Deschutes River in Bend, in the U.S. state of Oregon. It is between Pacific Power's Bend Hydro dam and the Colorado dam, between RM 166 and 167. The pond is flanked by Drake, Harmon, Pageant, Brooks, Columbia, Miller's Landing, and McKay parks, as well as a number of buildings such as Pine Tavern and private homes. Some people mistakenly consider the Galveston (Tumalo) bridge the upper boundary of Mirror Pond; others call the portion of the lake between Galveston bridge and the Colorado dam "upper Mirror Pond".

== History ==
Mirror Pond was created in 1910 by the construction of the Bend Water, Light & Power Company dam which provided the city with its initial source of electricity. The dam has been owned by Pacific Power since 1926 and produces electricity for approximately 200 Bend households.

== Siltation ==
Since the construction of the dam, the flow of the Deschutes River deposits sediment from the approximately 700,000 acres (2,800 km^{2}) Upper Deschutes River watershed into Mirror Pond. As a result, sediment has settled behind the dam, creating shallow mudflats along the margins. Mirror Pond is the only impoundment of the upper Deschutes River for electricity.

In 1984, the community supported a $312,000 dredging project (equivalent to $967,000 today) to repair the Pond's features, but the result was not lasting. The work included removal of some 60,000 cubic feet (1,700 m^{3}) of material to achieve a minimum depth of 5 feet (150 cm).

The sedimentation in Mirror Pond has again become a concern for the Bend community because the mudflats interfere with the flow of the river, recreational uses, and have altered the aesthetics of Mirror Pond in relation to Drake Park and downtown Bend tourism and commerce.

== Related ==
There is also an impoundment downstream created by the North Canal Dam which is a diversion for Pilot Butte Canal, now part of the Central Oregon Irrigation District.

== See also ==
- List of lakes in Oregon
