= McKay Park =

- Location within Oregon
- Location: Bend, Oregon, U.S.
- Coordinates: 44.049949°N 121.3216727°W
- Area: 3.9 acres (1.6 ha)
- Open: May 2000

McKay Park is a 3.9-acre (1.6 ha) park in Bend, Oregon, in the United States. Named after Clyde McKay, the park opened in May 2000.
