= Bend, Oregon =

City in Oregon, U.S.

- City
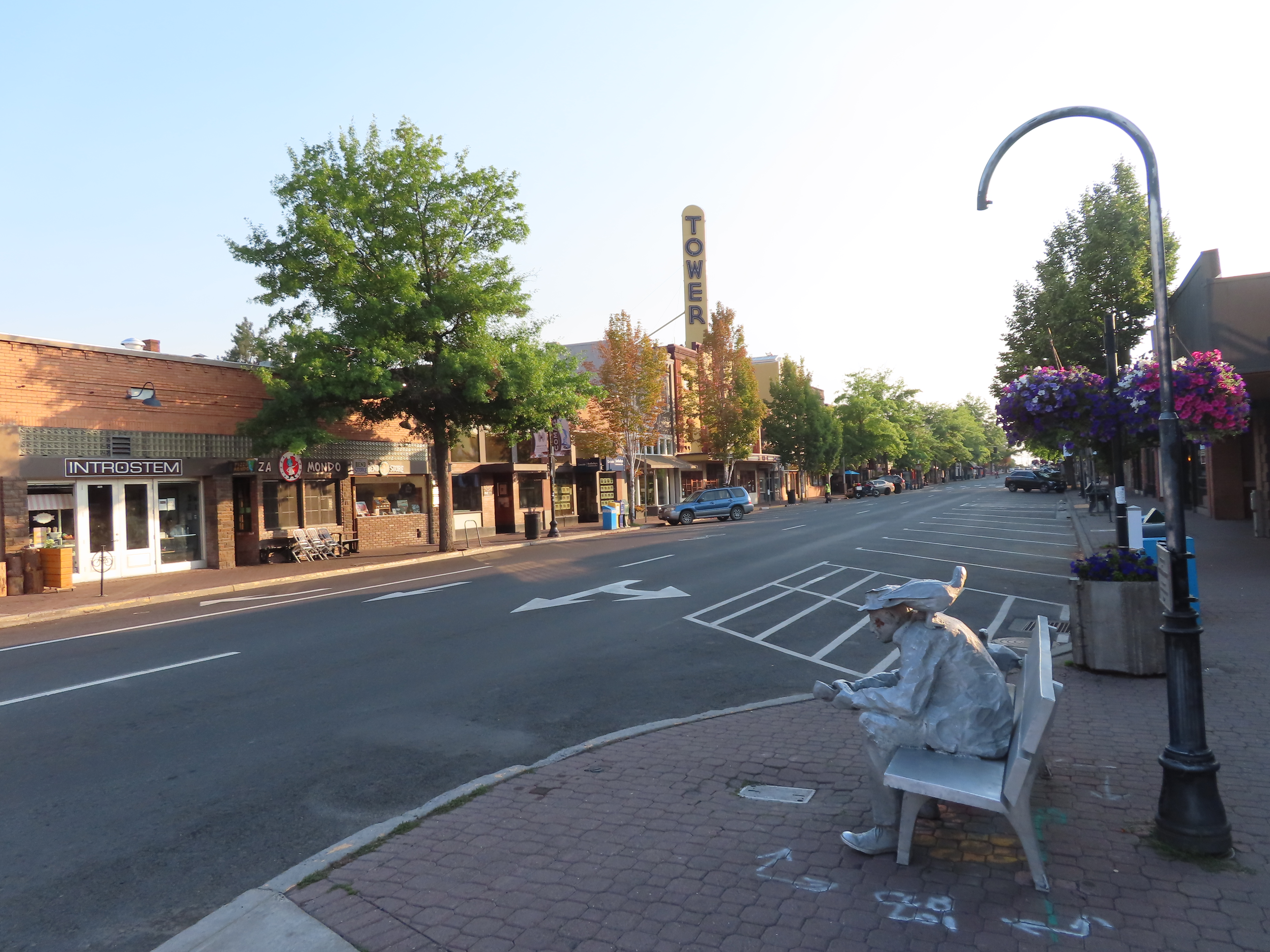
- Downtown Bend
- Motto: Bend: Living at Its Best
- Location in Bend in Deschutes County, Oregon
- Coordinates: 44°03′29″N 121°18′55″W
- Country: United States
- State: Oregon
- County: Deschutes
- Platted: May 28, 1904
- Incorporated: January 4, 1905

Area
  - City: 35.046 sq mi (90.769 km^{2})
  - Land: 34.801 sq mi (90.135 km^{2})
  - Water: 0.245 sq mi (0.635 km^{2})
- Elevation: 3,642 ft (1,110 m)

Population (2020)
  - City: 99,178
  - Estimate (July 1, 2024): 106,926
  - Rank: US: 311th OR: 6th
  - Density: 2,980/sq mi (1,151/km^{2})
  - Urban: 106,988 (US: 305th)
  - Metro: 260,919 (US: 192nd)
- Demonym: Bendite

GDP
  - Metro: $15.446 billion (2023)
- Time zone: UTC–8 (Pacific (PST))
  - Summer (DST): UTC–7 (PDT)
- ZIP Codes: 97701, 97702, 97703, 97707, 97708, 97709
- Area codes: 541 and 458
- FIPS code: 41-05800
- GNIS feature ID: 2409832
- Website: bendoregon.gov

Bend is a city in Central Oregon and the county seat of Deschutes County. It is located to the east of the Cascade Range, on the Deschutes River. Bend is the most populous city in Central Oregon and sixth-most populous city in the state, with a population of 99,178 as of the 2020 census. The Bend metropolitan statistical area (MSA) has a population of 247,493 and was the fifth largest metropolitan area in Oregon.

The site became known by pioneers as a fordable crossing point of the river, where it ran through a bend. An 1870s ranch popularized the name "Farewell Bend," with the post office later distinguishing the area as Bend. It was incorporated as a city in 1905, starting off as a logging town. In 1910, Mirror Pond was created as a dammed river reservoir to provide energy. In 1950, the two major logging companies were consolidated due to depleted timber, causing an economic drop. In later decades, it experienced rapid growth as a center of tourism and recreation.

Situated in the Oregon High Desert, Bend is bordered by the Deschutes National Forest to the southwest. Economically, it is a tourist destination, featuring recreational attractions (e.g. breweries, an amphitheater, Mt. Bachelor, and the last Blockbuster video-rental store) as well as outdoor sports, including mountain biking, fishing, hiking, camping, rock climbing, white-water rafting, skiing, paragliding, and golf.

== History ==
=== Early history ===
American Indian tribes hunted and fished in the area. In late 1824, members of a fur-trapping party led by Peter Skene Ogden visited the area. John C. Frémont, John Strong Newberry, and other United States Army survey parties came next. Subsequent American pioneers heading further west passed through the area and forded the Deschutes River at a canyonless double bend, which may have actually been referred to as "Farewell Bend". The area was settled by Euro-Americans in the 1870s. John Young Todd, a Missourian who participated in the Mexican War (and for whom Todd Lake is named), purchased a land claim in the area and named it "Farewell Bend Ranch". Todd sold this to John Sisemore in 1881, who applied for a post office in 1886. Because the name "Farewell Bend" was already in use, it was shortened to "Bend" by the United States Post Office Department.

=== 20th century ===
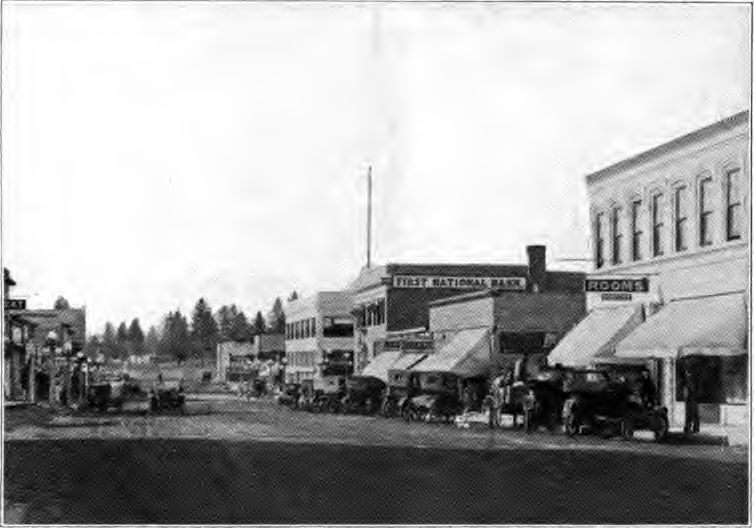
Downtown Bend, circa 1920

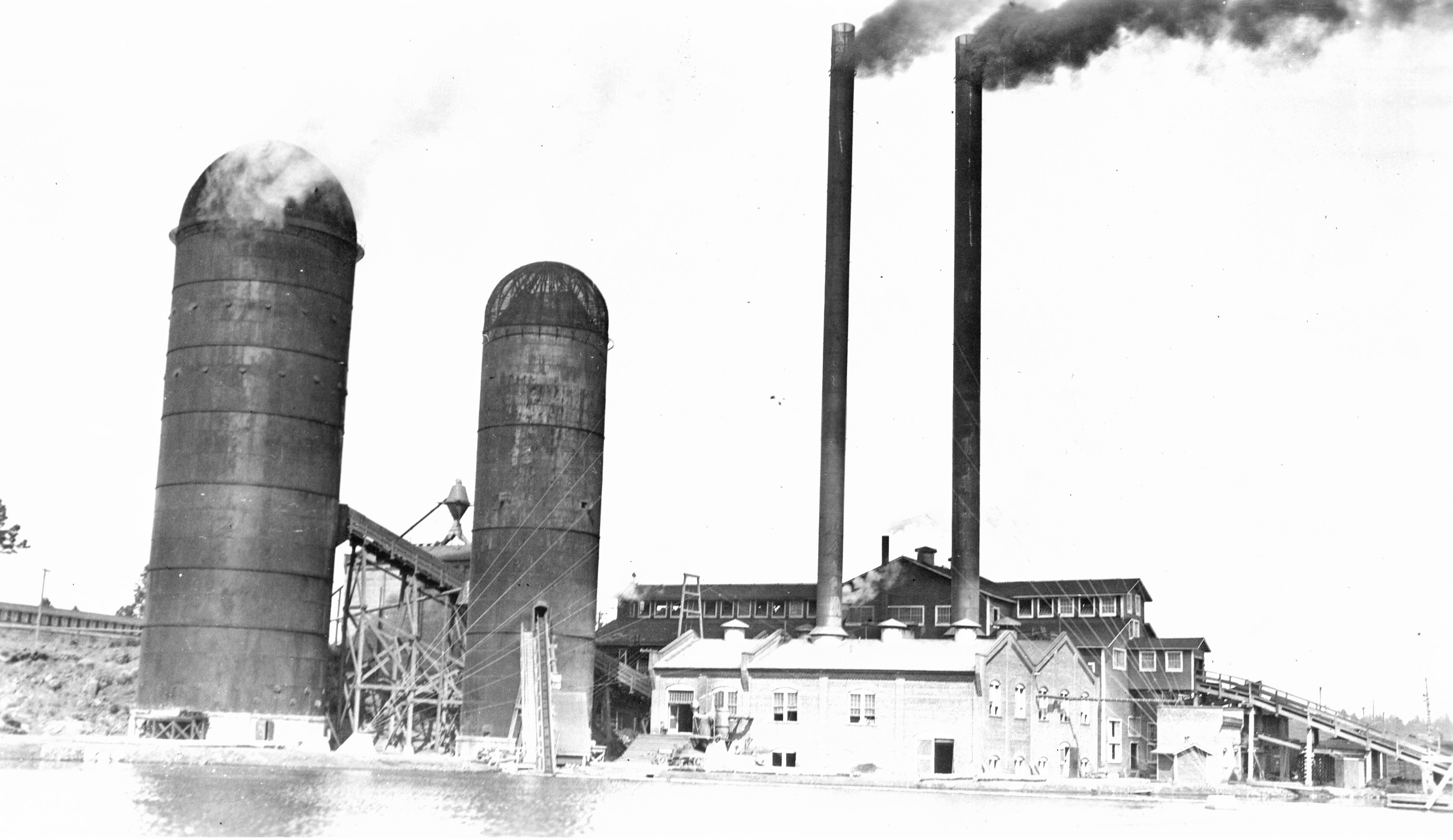
Brooks-Scanlon Lumber Company in 1922

Constructed in May 1901, the Pilot Butte Development Company's little plant was the first commercial sawmill in Bend, also providing the town's first irrigation. The original location was at the rear of the Pilot Butte Inn of later years. Steidl and Reed also set up a small mill in Bend in 1903. This was on the Deschutes River just below the Pioneer Park area. The mill was operated by water power.

A small community developed around the area. In 1904, a city was incorporated by a general vote of the community's 300 residents; it was platted by Pilot Butte Development Company on May 28, 1904. On January 4, 1905, the city held its first official meeting as an incorporated municipality, appointing A. H. Goodwillie as its first mayor.

In 1910, Mirror Pond was created by the construction of the Bend Water, Light & Power Company dam on the Deschutes River in Bend. The dam provided the city with its initial source of electricity. The dam has been owned by Pacific Power since 1926 and still produces electricity that supplies approximately 200 Bend households. In 1916, Deschutes County was formed from the western half of Crook County and Bend was designated as the county seat. In 1929, Bend amended the charter and adopted the council–manager form of government.

The 1950 closure of Shevlin-Hixon Lumber Company (which was sold to Brooks-Scanlon), due to a lack of significant timber, caused the largest economic drop in the region since the Great Depression. In later decades, it experienced rapid growth as a center for both recreation and retirement.

=== 21st century ===
On April 15, 2001, Utah-based POWDR Corp. acquired the Mount Bachelor ski area.

On August 28, 2022, a mass shooting occurred at a Safeway grocery store in Bend. Two senior citizens, one of whom was an employee at the store, were killed, and two others were wounded before the gunman committed suicide. Four people, including a teacher and three students, were killed by a gunman in a shooting at Silver Rail Elementary School on October 15, 2026, before the perpetrator was killed by the father of two students at the school.

== Geography ==
Bend sits on the boundary of the Eastern Cascades Slopes and Foothills, a Level III ecoregion designated by the United States Environmental Protection Agency (EPA) in the U.S. states of Oregon, Washington, and California, and the Deschutes River Valley, a Level IV ecoregion within the Blue Mountains Level III ecoregion.

The Deschutes River runs through Bend, where it is dammed to form Mirror Pond. Bend's elevation is 3,623 feet (1,104 metres) above sea level.

According to the United States Census Bureau, the city has a total area of 35.046 square miles (90.77 km^{2}), of which 34.801 square miles (90.13 km^{2}) is land and 0.245 square miles (0.63 km^{2}) is water.

Inside the city limits is Pilot Butte State Scenic Viewpoint, an old cinder cone. Bend is one of three cities in the continental U.S. (with Portland, Oregon, and Jackson, Mississippi) to have an extinct volcano within its city limits. It is reached by U.S. Route 20. A lesser known characteristic of Bend, the Horse Lava Tube System enters and borders the eastern edge of the city. Just south of Bend is Newberry National Volcanic Monument on U.S. Route 97.

=== Climate ===
Bend, Oregon

Climate chart (precipitation, max. and min. temperature)
J	F	M	A	M	J	J	A	S	O	N	D
1.4 43 25	1 46 24	0.7 52 28	0.8 58 31	1 66 37	0.7 74 42	0.4 84 49	0.4 83 48	0.3 76 41	0.7 63 34	1.3 49 28	2.1 41 23
- █ Average max. and min. temperatures in °F
- █ Precipitation totals in inches
- Source: NOAA
Metric conversion
J	F	M	A	M	J	J	A	S	O	N	D
36 6 −4	25 8 −4	18 11 −2	20 14 −1	25 19 3	17 23 6	11 29 9	8.9 29 9	7.9 24 5	17 17 1	32 10 −2	53 5 −5
- █ Average max. and min. temperatures in °C
- █ Precipitation totals in mm

Bend is often referred to locally as part of Oregon’s “high desert,” reflecting its elevation and relative dryness compared to the west side of the Cascades. In the Köppen climate classification, however, Bend has a cool semi-arid climate (BSk). The city receives about 10.6 in (270 mm) of precipitation annually, considerably more than the roughly 6 inches or 155 millimeters that would define a true desert at its elevation and temperature, placing it in the steppe rather than desert category.

While the city center of Bend has a cool semi-arid climate, areas immediately to the west rise quickly into the Cascades, where precipitation is much higher and the climate grades into a dry-summer continental type (Dsb).

In Bend, annual average snowfall is 21.6 inches or 0.55 meters, with a range from 90.6 inches (2.3 m) between July 1973 and June 1974, down to 6.1 inches (0.15 m) between July 1976 and June 1977. The wettest "rain year" in total precipitation was from July 1981 to June 1982 with 18.84 inches (478.5 mm) and the driest from July 1967 to June 1968 with 5.63 inches (143.0 mm), although only 5.49 inches or 139.4 millimeters fell in the incomplete year from July 1993 to June 1994.

The winter season provides a mean temperature of 32.1 °F (0.1 °C) in December. Nighttime temperatures are not much lower than daytime highs during the winter. Annually, the lowest nighttime temperature is typically −5 °F (−21 °C) to −10 °F (−23 °C) (Zone 6). The coldest temperature ever recorded in Bend is −26 °F or −32.2 °C, which occurred on February 9, 1933 and again on January 31, 1950, while the coldest maximum was −6 °F or −21.1 °C on February 4, 1989.

Central Oregon summers are marked by their very large diurnal temperature ranges, with a July daily average of 64.5 °F (18.1 °C), and an average diurnal temperature variation approaching 35 °F or 19 °C. Hard frosts are not unheard of during the summer months. Autumn usually brings warm, dry days and cooler nights. Bend is known for its annual Indian summer. According to the Western Regional Climate Center of the Desert Research Institute, the mean of the monthly average maximum temperatures in July, the hottest month in Bend, between 1928 and 2006 was 82.09 °F or 27.8 °C. The hottest temperature on record has been 107 °F or 41.7 °C on June 30, 2021. Bend's growing season is short; according to the U.S. Department of Agriculture's National Resources Conservation Service, in half of the years between 1971 and 2000, the USDA weather station in Bend recorded the last below-freezing temperatures after July 3 and the first below-freezing temperatures before August 31. Based on 1981–2010 normals, the average window for freezing temperatures is September 13 through June 19.

Climate data for Bend, Oregon (1991–2020 normals, extremes 1901–present)
Month	Jan	Feb	Mar	Apr	May	Jun	Jul	Aug	Sep	Oct	Nov	Dec	Year
Record high °F (°C)	71 (22)	76 (24)	83 (28)	93 (34)	93 (34)	107 (42)	104 (40)	103 (39)	100 (38)	91 (33)	77 (25)	68 (20)	107 (42)
Mean maximum °F (°C)	57.3 (14.1)	59.8 (15.4)	67.6 (19.8)	76.3 (24.6)	83.3 (28.5)	88.9 (31.6)	94.8 (34.9)	94.9 (34.9)	90.0 (32.2)	80.2 (26.8)	66.2 (19.0)	55.0 (12.8)	96.5 (35.8)
Mean daily maximum °F (°C)	42.5 (5.8)	45.7 (7.6)	51.7 (10.9)	57.7 (14.3)	66.3 (19.1)	73.7 (23.2)	83.8 (28.8)	83.3 (28.5)	75.8 (24.3)	63.0 (17.2)	49.1 (9.5)	41.0 (5.0)	61.1 (16.2)
Daily mean °F (°C)	33.6 (0.9)	35.0 (1.7)	39.7 (4.3)	44.1 (6.7)	51.6 (10.9)	57.8 (14.3)	66.2 (19.0)	65.5 (18.6)	58.5 (14.7)	48.3 (9.1)	38.6 (3.7)	32.1 (0.1)	47.6 (8.7)
Mean daily minimum °F (°C)	24.6 (−4.1)	24.3 (−4.3)	27.6 (−2.4)	30.5 (−0.8)	37.0 (2.8)	42.0 (5.6)	48.6 (9.2)	47.8 (8.8)	41.3 (5.2)	33.7 (0.9)	28.2 (−2.1)	23.3 (−4.8)	34.1 (1.2)
Mean minimum °F (°C)	7.3 (−13.7)	8.8 (−12.9)	16.6 (−8.6)	20.6 (−6.3)	25.3 (−3.7)	31.1 (−0.5)	38.5 (3.6)	37.5 (3.1)	29.1 (−1.6)	19.7 (−6.8)	12.3 (−10.9)	5.9 (−14.5)	−1.6 (−18.7)
Record low °F (°C)	−26 (−32)	−26 (−32)	−13 (−25)	8 (−13)	11 (−12)	21 (−6)	27 (−3)	22 (−6)	12 (−11)	0 (−18)	−14 (−26)	−25 (−32)	−26 (−32)
Average precipitation inches (mm)	1.41 (36)	0.99 (25)	0.70 (18)	0.79 (20)	0.97 (25)	0.68 (17)	0.44 (11)	0.35 (8.9)	0.31 (7.9)	0.65 (17)	1.26 (32)	2.01 (51)	10.62 (270)
Average snowfall inches (cm)	6.4 (16)	5.5 (14)	1.5 (3.8)	0.7 (1.8)	0.0 (0.0)	0.0 (0.0)	0.0 (0.0)	0.0 (0.0)	0.0 (0.0)	0.2 (0.51)	2.0 (5.1)	5.3 (13)	21.6 (55)
Average precipitation days	8.7	7.1	6.0	6.0	5.3	3.8	2.2	2.1	2.0	4.0	7.0	8.8	63.0
Average snowy days	4.2	2.8	1.2	0.5	0.0	0.0	0.0	0.0	0.0	0.2	1.4	3.6	13.9
Mean monthly sunshine hours	173.6	159.6	235.6	300.0	327.0	339.0	372.0	368.9	324.0	207.7	189.0	167.4	3,163.8
Mean daily sunshine hours	5.6	5.7	7.6	10.0	10.9	11.3	12.0	11.9	10.8	6.7	6.3	5.4	8.7
Percentage possible sunshine	60	54	63	74	74	73	79	86	86	60	65	61	70
Source 1: NOAA
Source 2: Weather Atlas

=== Neighborhoods ===
There are 13 officially recognized neighborhood districts:

- Awbrey Butte
- Boyd Acres
- Century West
- Larkspur
- Mountain View
- Old Bend
- Old Farm District
- Orchard District
- River West
- Southeast Bend
- Southern Crossing
- Southwest Bend
- Summit West

== Demographics ==
Historical population
Census	Pop.	Note	%±
1910	536		—
1920	5,415		910.3%
1930	8,848		63.4%
1940	10,021		13.3%
1950	11,409		13.9%
1960	11,936		4.6%
1970	13,710		14.9%
1980	17,263		25.9%
1990	20,469		18.6%
2000	52,029		154.2%
2010	76,639		47.3%
2020	99,178		29.4%
2023 (est.)	104,557		5.4%
U.S. Decennial Census; 2020 Census

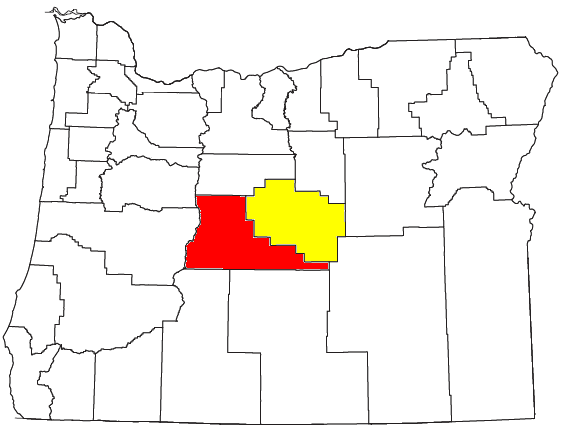
The location of the Bend-Prineville CSA and its components: Bend Metropolitan Statistical Area Prineville Micropolitan Statistical Area

Bend is the principal city of the Bend Metropolitan Statistical Area and the former Bend-Prineville CSA, a Combined Statistical Area that included the former Bend metropolitan area (Deschutes County) and the Prineville micropolitan area (Crook County). In 2023, the Office of Management and Budget combined the former CSA with adjacent Jefferson County to form the new Bend metropolitan area, which had a combined estimated population of 260,919 by the United States Census Bureau as of that year.

=== Racial and ethnic composition ===
Bend, Oregon – Racial and ethnic composition Note: the US Census treats Hispanic/Latino as an ethnic category. This table excludes Latinos from the racial categories and assigns them to a separate category. Hispanics/Latinos may be of any race.
Race / Ethnicity (NH = Non-Hispanic)	Pop 2000	Pop 2010	Pop 2020	% 2000	% 2010	% 2020
White alone (NH)	47,660	66,911	81,355	91.60%	87.31%	82.03%
Black or African American alone (NH)	139	333	445	0.27%	0.43%	0.45%
Native American or Alaska Native alone (NH)	366	486	466	0.70%	0.63%	0.47%
Asian alone (NH)	513	918	1,602	0.99%	1.20%	1.62%
Pacific Islander alone (NH)	39	89	141	0.07%	0.12%	0.14%
Other race alone (NH)	44	80	548	0.08%	0.10%	0.55%
Mixed race or Multiracial (NH)	872	1,566	5,521	1.68%	2.04%	5.57%
Hispanic or Latino (any race)	2,396	6,256	9,100	4.61%	8.16%	9.18%
Total	52,029	76,639	99,178	100.00%	100.00%	100.00%

=== 2020 census ===
As of the 2020 census, Bend had a population of 99,178, 40,969 households, and 25,421 families living in the city, and the population density was 2,949.8 inhabitants per square mile (1,138.9/km^{2}). The median age was 39.4 years; 21.1% of residents were under the age of 18, 5.1% were under the age of five, and 17.7% were 65 years of age or older, while there were 96.6 males for every 100 females and 94.5 males for every 100 females age 18 and over. 99.7% of residents lived in urban areas, while 0.3% lived in rural areas. Of the 40,969 households, 28.6% had children under the age of 18 living with them, 48.4% were married-couple households, 17.4% were households with a male householder and no spouse or partner present, and 25.0% were households with a female householder and no spouse or partner present; 26.2% of all households were made up of individuals, and 11.4% had someone living alone who was 65 years of age or older. There were 44,449 housing units, of which 7.8% were vacant; among occupied housing units, 60.6% were owner-occupied and 39.4% were renter-occupied, with a homeowner vacancy rate of 1.1% and a rental vacancy rate of 4.4%.

Racial composition as of the 2020 census
Race	Number	Percent
White	83,773	84.5%
Black or African American	500	0.5%
American Indian and Alaska Native	655	0.7%
Asian	1,630	1.6%
Native Hawaiian and Other Pacific Islander	148	0.1%
Some other race	3,566	3.6%
Two or more races	8,906	9.0%
Hispanic or Latino (of any race)	9,100	9.2%

=== 2010 census ===
As of the 2010 census, there were 76,639 people, 31,790 households, and 19,779 families residing in the city. The population density was 2,322.0/sq mi (896.5/km^{2}). There were 36,110 housing units at an average density of 1,093.9/sq mi (422.4/km^{2}). The racial makeup of the city was 91.3% White, 0.5% African American, 0.8% Native American, 1.2% Asian, 0.1% Pacific Islander, 3.4% from other races, and 2.6% from two or more races. Hispanic or Latino residents of any race were 8.2% of the population.

There were 31,790 households, of which 31.7% had children under the age of 18 living with them, 47.9% were married couples living together, 9.9% had a female householder with no husband present, 4.4% had a male householder with no wife present, and 37.8% were non-families. 27.1% of all households were made up of individuals, and 9.1% had someone living alone who was 65 years of age or older. The average household size was 2.39 and the average family size was 2.91.

The median age in the city was 36.6 years. 23.7% of residents were under the age of 18; 8.7% were between the ages of 18 and 24; 30% were from 25 to 44; 25.1% were from 45 to 64; and 12.4% were 65 years of age or older. The gender makeup of the city was 49.0% male and 51.0% female.

== Economy ==
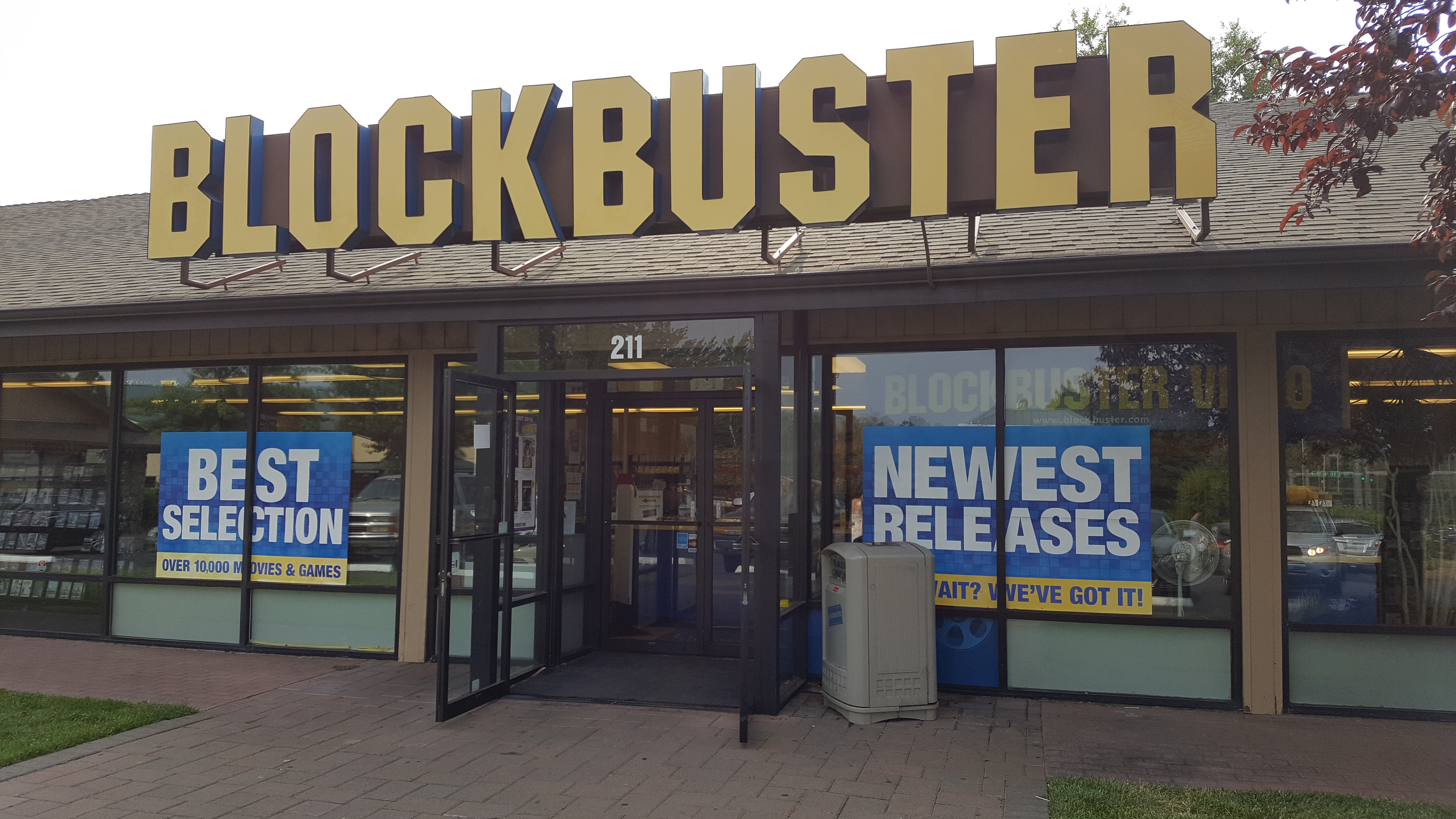
The last remaining Blockbuster location is in Bend

Tourism is one of Bend's largest sectors. The Mount Bachelor ski resort brings in tourists from all over Oregon, Washington, and California. The nearby Cascade Lakes are also a large draw for tourists. Recreational activities include downhill and cross country skiing, hiking, biking, rafting, golfing, camping, fishing, picnicking, rock climbing, and general sightseeing. Transient room tax revenues from July 2024 to March 2025 exceeded $7.8 million. In 2019, the officially licensed Blockbuster Video in the city became the last remaining one in the world and is a tourist attraction.

The transient room tax is used in partnership with Visit Bend and the Bend Economic Development Advisory Board to convert visitors to Bend into residents and business owners. In 2011, Visit Bend reported that families are the largest demographic that visit Bend (35%), while couples with no children make up the second largest portion (24%) of visitors to the city. During the same year, tourism generated $570 million and employed 16% of the city's workforce. Brauns, L. (November 21, 2021). According to a 2019 economic impact data from Travel Oregon, “the local tourism industry employs 10,000 people and brings in more than $1 billion into the regional economy”

Room taxes attributed to tourism in Bend is divided up to be given back to the community. Bend, Oregon depends on $7 million in the room tax income that essentially funds services for Streets, Fire, and Police. $3 million are specifically contributed to the Bend Sustainability Fund and then the Bend Cultural Tourism fund. As of April 2021, the Bend City Council has agreed to spend an undisclosed portion of the $3 million to maintain some of the trails in the city.

Bend is home to the Deschutes Brewery, the eighth-largest craft brewery in the nation and the largest of over a dozen microbreweries in the city. Each year the city hosts many events celebrating its brewing culture, including the Bend Oktoberfest, the Little Woody Barrel Aged Brew and Whiskey Fest, Bend Brewfest, and Central Oregon Beer Week. Beer aficionados can also visit many of the breweries along the Bend Ale Trail. As of 2024, there were over 30 breweries in Bend and 4 hard cider companies. Since 2017, Bend's Worthy Brewing has hosted an observatory with a 16-inch reflecting Ritchey–Chrétien telescope.

=== Top employers ===
According to the City's 2023 Annual Comprehensive Financial Report, the largest employers in the city are:

#	Employer	Product or Service	# of Employees	Percentage
1	St. Charles Health System	Health care	3,506	3.6%
2	Bend-La Pine School District	Education	2,300	2.3%
3	Deschutes County	Government	1,284	1.3%
4	Mount Bachelor	Resort	1,081	1.1%
5	City of Bend	Government	717	0.7%
6	United States Forest Service	Government	615	0.6%
7	Bend Park and Recreation District	Government	591	0.6%
8	Oregon State University–Cascades	Education	470	0.5%
9	Lonza Group	Pharmaceutical	463	0.5%
10	Central Oregon Community College	Education	450	0.5%
—	Total employers	—	11,477	11.7%

In 2005, Bend's economic profile comprised five industry categories: tourism (7,772 jobs); healthcare and social services (6,062 jobs); professional, scientific and technical services (1,893 jobs); wood products manufacturing (1,798 jobs); and recreation and transportation equipment (1,065 jobs).

Much of Bend's rapid growth in recent years is also due to its attraction as a retirement destination. Bend has also become a commuter town for a number of tech workers in the San Francisco Bay Area and Seattle metropolitan area despite the extreme commute, due to its appeal to the outdoors as well as its relatively cheap cost of living compared to the skyrocketing rent and housing prices of the Bay Area and Seattle.

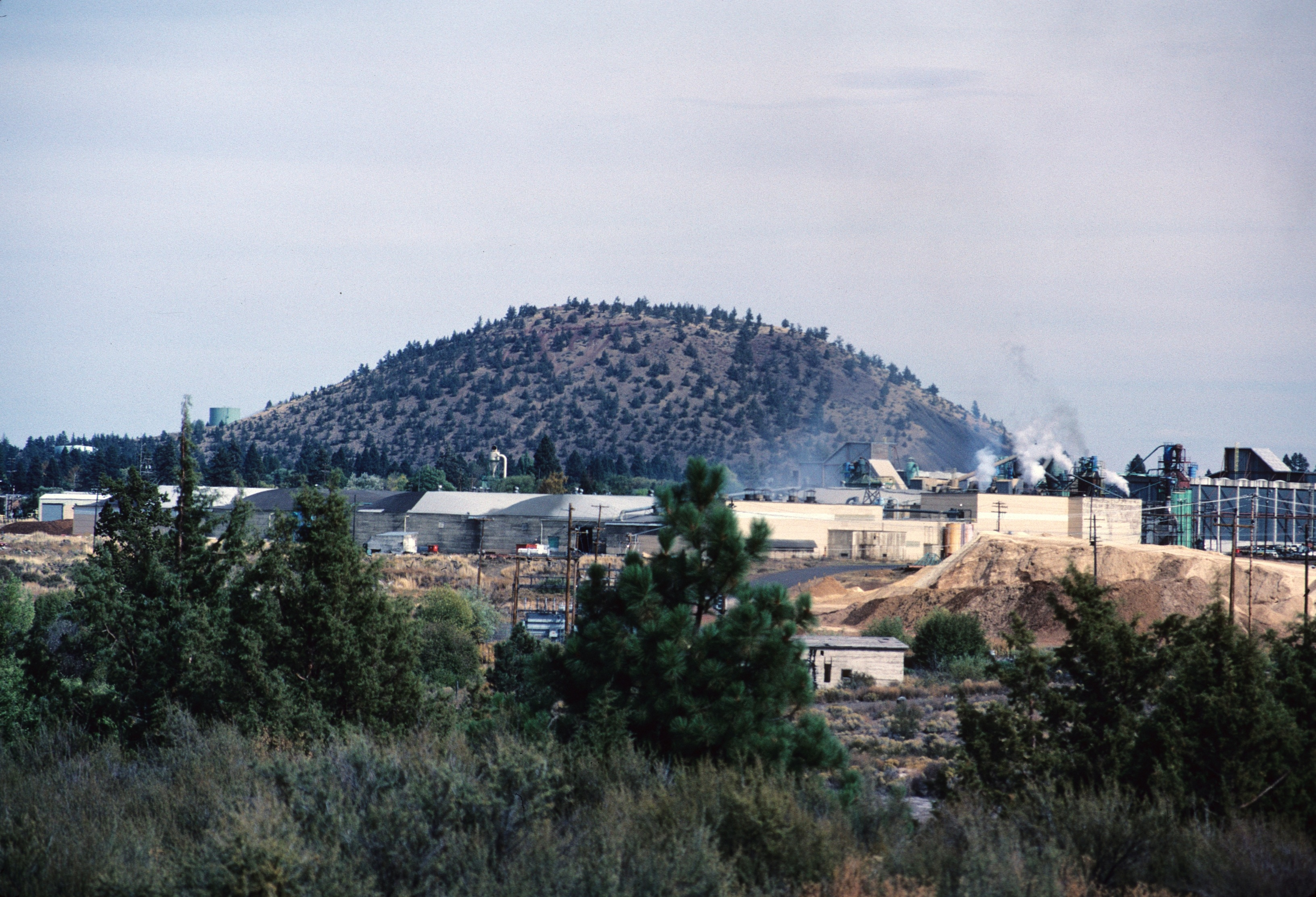
Lumber mill and Pilot Butte

=== Construction and real estate ===
In 2005 construction and real estate accounted for 17.3 percent of all jobs in the Bend metropolitan statistical area (MSA), which constitutes all of Deschutes County. This figure is about 70 percent more than the proportion of construction and real estate jobs in the Oregon and national economies. Construction activity in Bend appears to be slowing. The number of building permit applications received by the Bend City Building Division fell from 826 in August 2006 to 533 in August 2007, a 35 percent decrease. New building permits dropped considerably during the 2008 financial crisis, and have remained in the 100-300 per month range since 2016.

A large influx of new residents drawn by Bend's lifestyle amenities, along with the low interest rates and easy lending that fostered a national housing boom in 2001–05, resulted in increased activity in Bend's construction and real estate sectors and caused the rate of home price appreciation in Bend to grow substantially during that period. Median home prices in the Bend MSA increased by over 80% in the 2001–05 period.

In June 2006, Money magazine named the Bend MSA the fifth most overpriced real estate market in the United States. By September 2006, the Bend metro area ranked second in the list of most overpriced housing markets, and in June 2007 it was named the most overpriced housing market in America. The median home listing price in Bend is >$750,000 as of May 2025.

The 2008−09 housing downturn had a strong effect on Bend's housing and economic situation. According to the Seattle Times, single-family home prices dropped more than 40 percent from a peak of $396,000 in May 2007 to $221,000 in March 2009. Additional signs of the housing downturn include an April 2009 Deschutes county unemployment rate of 12.6 percent and in a tri-county area of Deschutes, Crook and Jefferson counties a 66 percent rise in homelessness from 2006 to 2,237.

In May 2010, the Federal Housing and Finance Agency released a report in which Bend had the largest price drop in the country, 23 percent, from first quarter of 2009 to the first quarter of 2010.

== Arts and culture ==
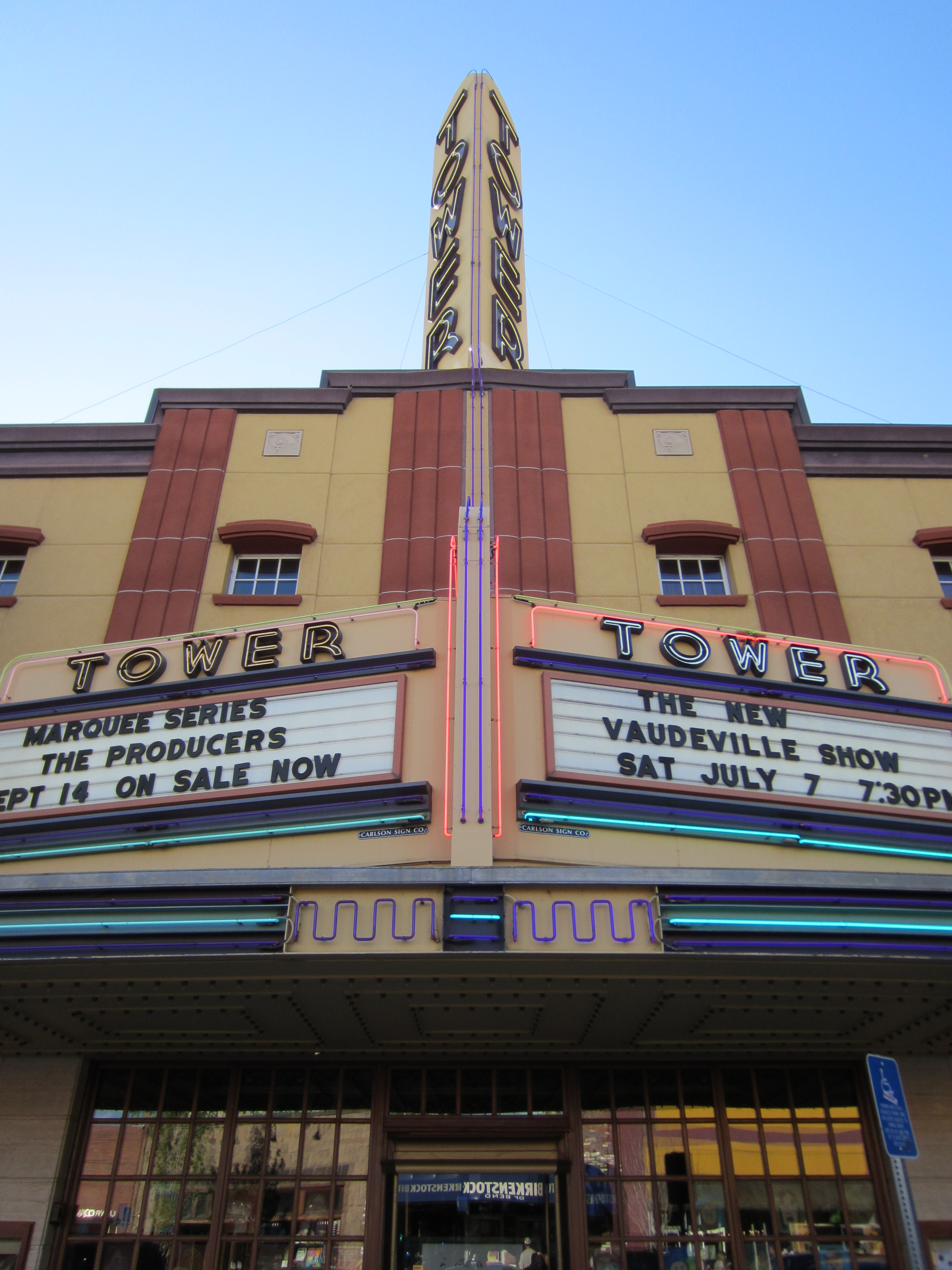
Tower Theatre

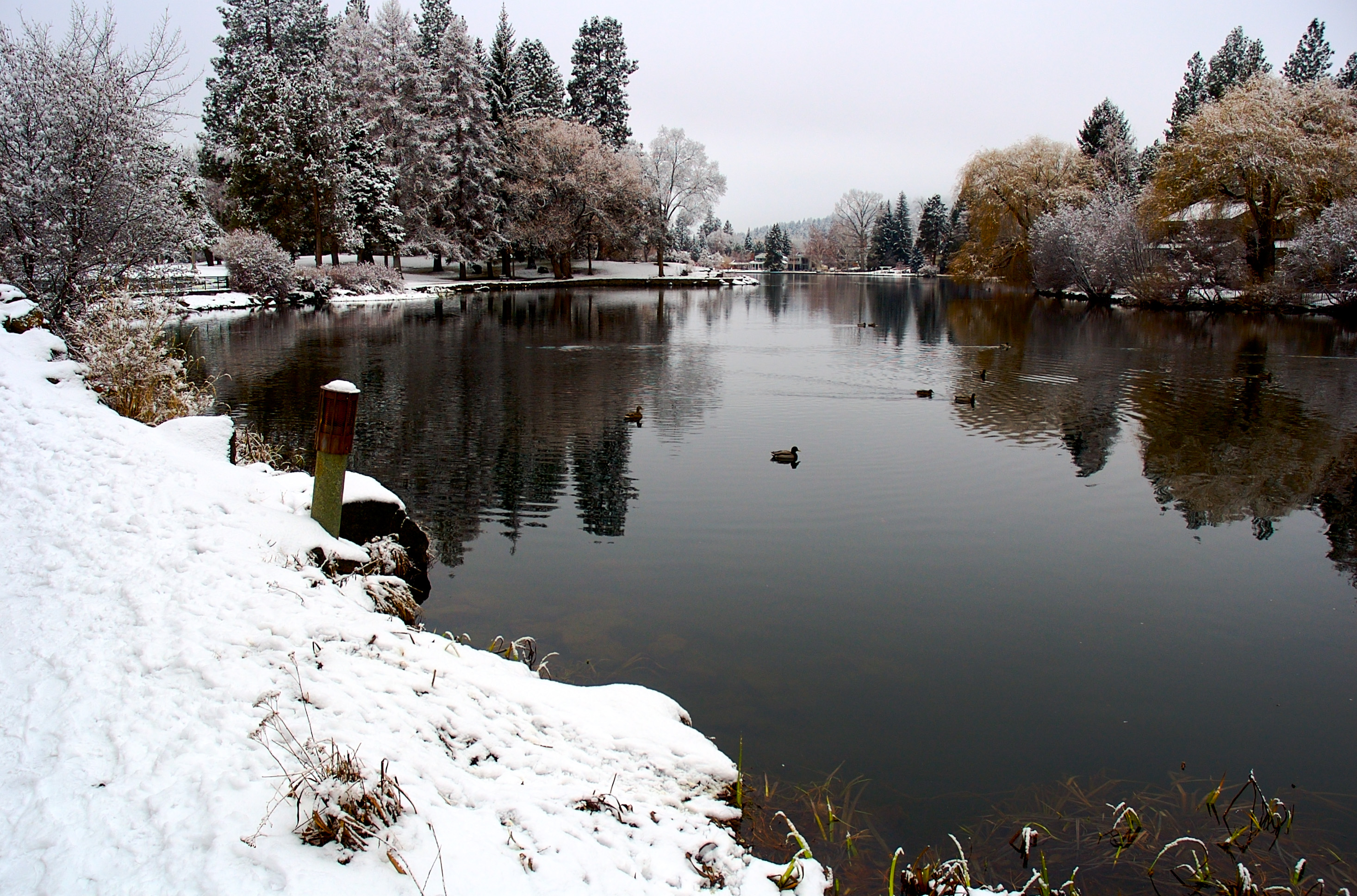
Mirror Pond from Drake Park

The city is becoming known for its burgeoning art scene, and is home to numerous visual and fine art galleries, as well as the independent BendFilm Festival, which launched in 2004.

There are numerous public art displays, including the Roundabout Art Route tour of outdoor sculptures throughout the city.

=== Museums ===
- Deschutes Historical Museum (located in the historic Reid School building)
- High Desert Museum

=== National Register of Historic Places ===
- Evan Andreas Sather House
- Bend Amateur Athletic Club Gymnasium
- Charles Boyd Homestead Group
- Downing Building
- Drake Park Neighborhood Historic District
- George Palmer and Dorothy Binney Putnam House
- Goodwillie–Allen House
- N. P. Smith Pioneer Hardware Store
- O'Kane Building
- Thomas McCann House
- Trinity Episcopal Church

=== Attractions ===
- Hayden Homes Amphitheater
- Old Mill District
- Pine Tavern
- Tower Theatre
- Old St. Francis School
- Blockbuster (Bend, Oregon)

=== Natural history ===
- Mirror Pond
- Pine Mountain Observatory

== Sports ==
Bend is home to the Bend Elks of the West Coast Collegiate Baseball League. The Elks play at Vince Genna Stadium. Former minor league teams include the Bend Rockies, Bend Bucks, Bend Phillies, Bend Timber Hawks, and Bend Rainbows.

Bend is also the home of the Central Oregon Hotshots of the International Basketball League. The Central Oregon Steelheaders, continually one of the top teams in the NW conference of the Premier Arena Soccer League (PASL), play at the Central Oregon Indoor Sports Center in Bend.

Bend is the home of the professional cross-country skiing team XC Oregon, which competes in races locally, regionally, nationally and internationally.

Bend has had success in landing major sporting events such as the 2008 and 2009 USA Winter Triathlon National Championships, the 2008 and 2009 XTERRA Trail Running National Championships, the 2009 and 2010 United States National Cyclo-cross Championships, the 2009 and 2010 USA Cycling Elite Road National Championships and the 2013, 2015 and 2016 USA Cross Country Championships.

In 2019 and 2020, Bend hosted USA Climbing's pro and youth National Bouldering Championships.

A popular spot for cycling, Bend has over 300 mi (480 km) of mountain bike trails and from 1980 to 2019 was the home to the Cascade Cycling Classic, the nation's longest running stage race for road bicycle racing. In 2009, Bend was named the top mountain biking town in Mountain Bike Action magazine. The trail network is always growing, most recently with the announcement of 20 miles of new single track and downhill trails.

Bend is also home to the Deschutes County Rocks Boxing Team, a USA Boxing program ran by Level III USA Boxing coach Richard Miller, who is also the Golden Gloves & Silver Gloves President. February of each year Coach Miller hosts the Oregon State Golden Gloves Boxing Championship at Eagle Crest resort, a two-day event that highlights the best Olympic-bound boxers in the Northwest while bringing hundreds of boxing fans to the area. The program is non-profit and raises money for youth in the community.

== Parks and recreation ==
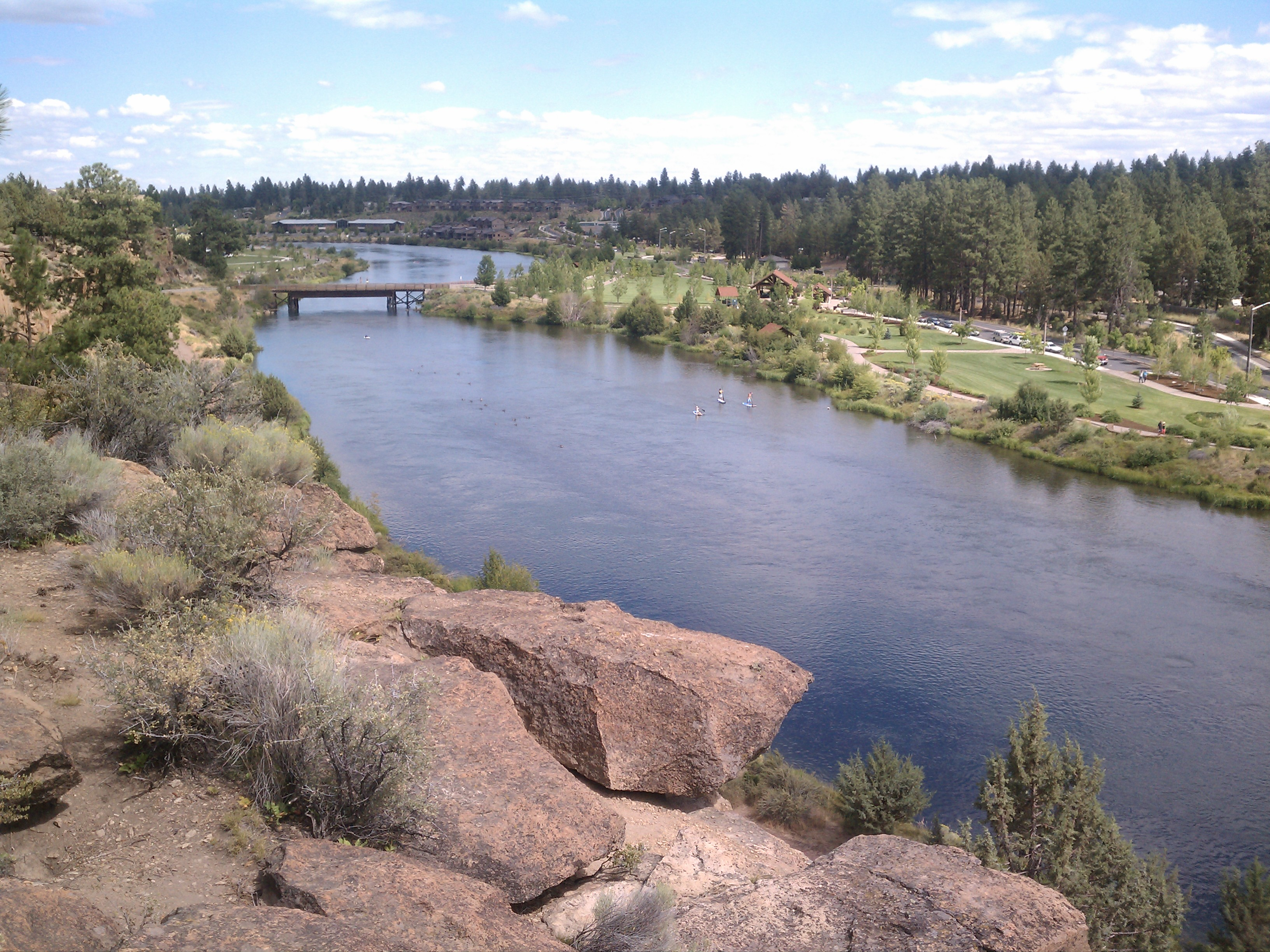
Farewell Bend Park

The Bend Park & Recreation District protects the parks, natural areas, recreational facilities, gardens, and trails of Bend.

- Cascade Lakes Scenic Byway
- Deschutes River
- Drake Park
- Pilot Butte State Park
- Shevlin Park
- McKay Park
- Farewell Bend Park
- Riverbend Park
- Ponderosa Skatepark

== Education ==
=== Higher education ===
Central Oregon Community College and the OSU-Cascades Campus of Oregon State University offer two- and four-year programs.

=== Public schools ===
The Bend area is served by the Bend–La Pine School District. It contains six high schools (Bend, Mountain View, Summit, Caldera, Deschutes River, and La Pine), six middle schools (Cascade, High Desert, Pilot Butte, Pacific Crest, La Pine and Sky View), and 19 elementary schools (including three magnet schools).

Charter schools include Desert Sky Montessori and the K-8 Bend International School.

=== Private schools ===
Private schools in the area include Eastmont School, Cascades Academy of Central Oregon, Seven Peaks, Waldorf School of Bend, St. Francis of Assisi, Morning Star Christian, and Trinity Lutheran School.

== Media ==
Newspapers

- Bend Bulletin
- The Source Weekly
- Cascade Business News

Television

- KOAB-TV 3 (PBS/Oregon Public Broadcasting)
- KTVZ 21 (NBC) - Owned by the News-Press & Gazette Company (NPG).
- KFXO-CD 39 (FOX) - On April 17, 2006, the station launched a local news broadcast. The station later was purchased by KTVZ's parent firm, News-Press and Gazette Co.
- KOHD 51 (ABC) - Chambers Communications (Eugene, Oregon) recently purchased a broadcast license for the market and began its local newscasts in the fall of 2007.
- KBNZ-LD 7 (CBS) - TDS, parent company of Bend Broadband, has purchased KBNZ. KOIN-TV Portland's news is offered with no local cut-ins.
- NTVZ-CW (CW). KTVZ (DT2). Broadcast by NPG of Oregon, The CW carries popular entertainment programming. First local on-air broadcast was September 2006.
- KQRE-TM (Telemundo). Subchannel of KFXO-CD. Spanish language television broadcast by NPG of Oregon since 2007.
- COTV (BendBroadband channel 11) - Carries RSN (Resort Sports Network), local events (parades, city council meetings, candidate forums). In addition, COTV airs local sports, including the Central Oregon Hotshots, Bend Elks, and local high school teams.

Radio

=== AM ===
- KRCO 690 AM - Sports format
- KBND 1110 AM - News Talk Information format
- KRDM 1240 AM - Regional Mexican format
- KBNW 1340 AM - News Talk Information format

=== FM ===
- KLBR 88.1 FM - National Public Radio and locally produced radio shows from Lane Community College. KLBR is a simulcast of KLCC (FM) in Eugene, Oregon.
- KPOV-FM 88.9 FM - Low-power community radio station owned by the Women's Civic Improvement League.
- KVRA 89.3 FM - Contemporary Christian format. Air 1.
- KVLB 90.5 FM - Contemporary Christian format K-LOVE.
- KOAB-FM 91.3 FM - Oregon Public Broadcasting
- KRCO-FM 95.7 FM - Classic country format.
- KNLR 97.5 FM - Contemporary Christian format.
- KTWS 98.3 FM - Classic rock format.
- KWRX 98.9 FM - non-commercial classical music format; the station is a translator of KWRX (88.5 FM) in Redmond, which is itself a simulcast of KWAX (91.1 FM) in Eugene.
- KMTK 99.7 FM - broadcasts a country music format.
- KMGX 100.7 FM - broadcasts a classic rock format.
- KLRR 101.7 FM - commercial adult album alternative music radio station in Redmond, Oregon, broadcasting to the Bend, Oregon area.
- KEGB-LP 102.1 FM - Christian Radio 3ABN Radio, broadcasting to the Bend Oregon area.
- KWPK-FM 104.1 FM - Hot Adult Contemporary format.
- KNLX 104.9 FM - Spanish Religious format.
- KQAK 105.7 FM - Classic Hits format.
- KWXS 107.7 FM - Adult standards format.

== Infrastructure ==
=== Transportation ===
==== Air ====
The nearest commercial airport is Roberts Field (RDM) in Redmond, 18 mi (29 km) north of Bend. Alaska Airlines, Horizon Air and SkyWest Airlines (flying as Alaska Airlines, American Eagle, Delta Connection and United Express) provide direct service to Burbank, Seattle, Salt Lake City, Phoenix, Denver, Los Angeles, San Diego, and San Francisco. The U.S. Forest Service operates an air base and training center for firefighting.

Bend Municipal Airport (KBDN) is located 5 mi (8 km) northeast of the city and serves general aviation. Several significant general aviation companies are based at Bend Airport, including Precise Flight, which develops oxygen systems, speed brakes, landing lights and other modifications for general aviation aircraft, and Epic Aircraft.

==== Bus ====
The Bend Hawthorne Transit Center is a hub for the Cascades East Transit center with connections to intercity bus services including Pacific Crest Bus Lines, POINT Intercity Bus Service, the People Mover, and the Central Oregon Breeze.

Bend was previously the only metropolitan area west of the Mississippi River without a public bus system. A measure that would have created a transit district was on the November 2004 ballot, but was defeated 53 to 41 percent. As of August 2006, however, funding was acquired and the B.A.T. (Bend Area Transit) bus service began on a limited basis. Buses have been running since September 27, 2006.

During summer 2007, not a single bus purchased was in operation (though several were due to weak A/C systems) and litigation was underway.

There are currently nine fixed bus routes offered by Cascades East Transit in Bend. The city is also started experimenting with a shared-ride van in 2019. The project was initially designed to find a replacement for a cancelled route that had limited riders.

==== Roads and highways ====
Roundabout sculptures

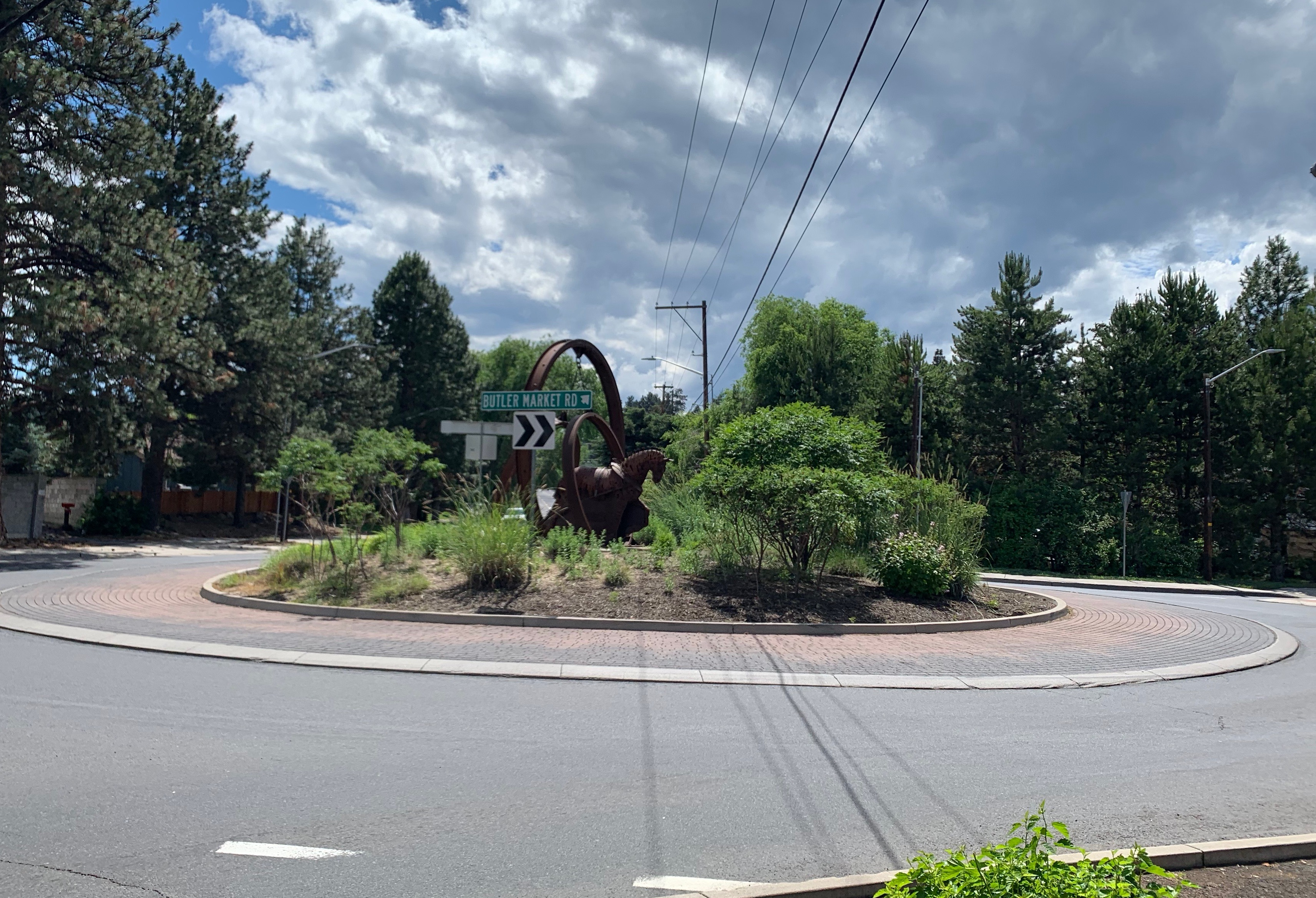
Horse on Butler Market & 8th

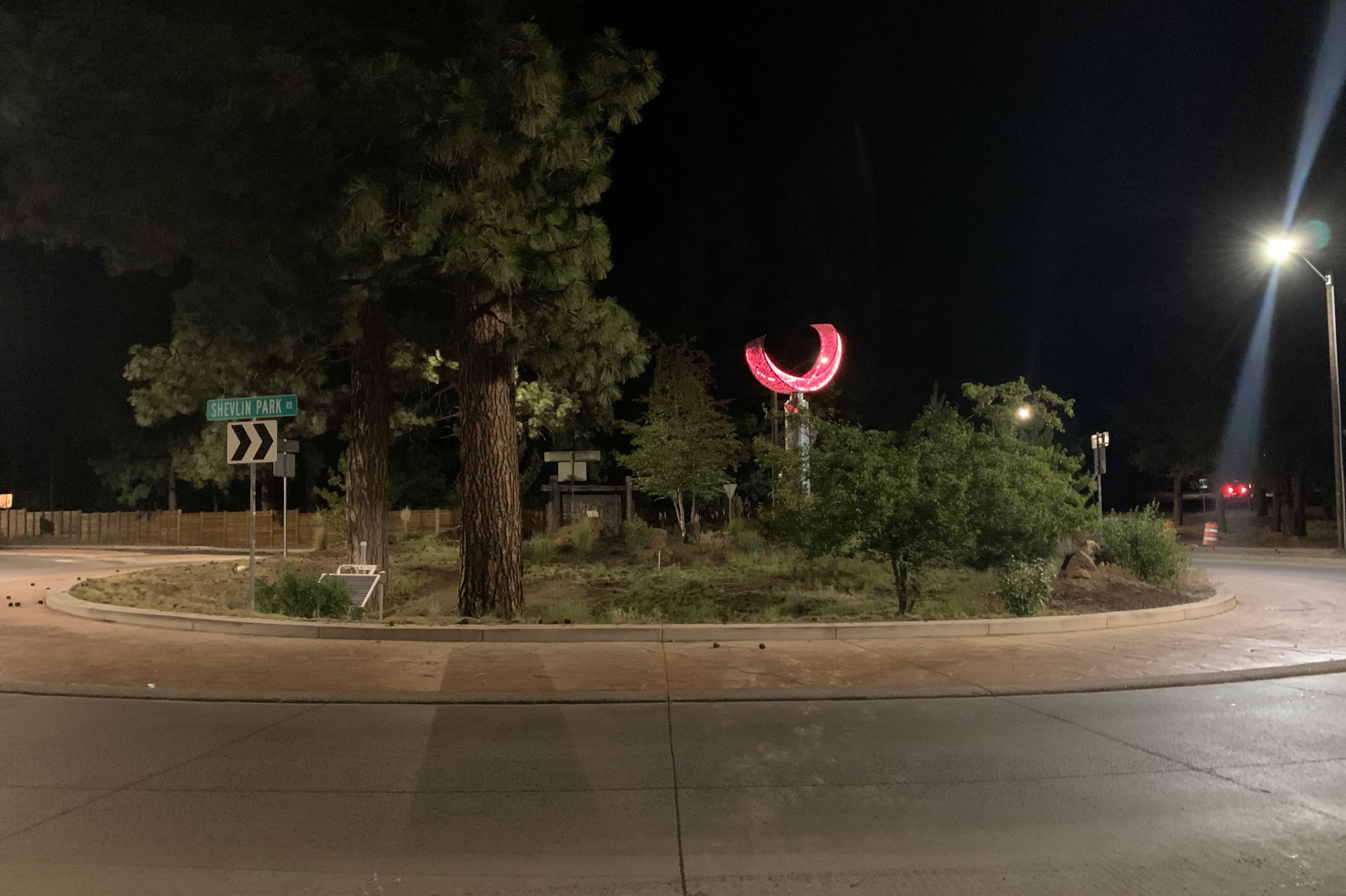
Crescent moon on Shevlin Park Rd

Bend lies at the intersection of U.S. Route 20 and U.S. Route 97. The latter runs on an expressway alignment through the city known as the Bend Parkway; a business route for US 97 runs along 3rd Street. The city is also served by the Century Drive Highway No. 372 which provides access to Mount Bachelor.

In an effort to improve the safety of the city's non-driving residents, Bend has been implementing roundabouts within the city.

==== Rail ====
A BNSF main line runs north–south through the city; there are numerous spurs off of the main line which serve industrial rail customers. The Spokane, Portland and Seattle Railway ran passenger service six days a week on a mixed train along that line from Bend to Wishram, Washington until some point between 1968 and 1970. The closest Amtrak station is in Chemult, approximately 65 mi (105 km) to the south; it is served by the Seattle–Los Angeles Coast Starlight.

==== Sustainable practices ====
In 2016, Bend adopted the Transportation System Plan, which is a 20-year plan that strives to achieve a healthy, equitable future for the entire community. The city is using community input to help this plan move forward, using experiments and data to drive their decisions on how people move within the city while incorporating land use throughout.

In July 2019, Oregon State University Cascade launched a ride share program as part of a study called Ride Bend, which was active until March 2020. Ride Bend hired the transit company Downtowner to help set up and implement an on demand, app based, electric van service in Bend's west side. Part of Ride Bend's study was to see whether people prefer sharing rides to get to their destination over fixed bus routes.

Ride Bend noticed that few people were using public transportation within the city, and many bus systems, such as Cascades East Transit, had to cancel their services because not enough people were taking the bus. Ride Bend not only succeeded in getting people to use public transportation again, effectively helping with traffic calming, but they also brought people to broader areas within the city.

An estimated 40,000 people have moved to Bend since the Transportation System Plan was written, and most of them brought cars with them.

== Notable people ==
- Ashton Eaton, decathlete, Olympian
- Donald M. Kerr, conservationist and founder of the High Desert Museum
- Brian Malarkey, celebrity chef
- Robert D. Maxwell, Medal of Honor recipient
- Max McNown, singer, songwriter
- Chino Moreno, lead vocalist of Deftones
- George P. Putnam, publisher, mayor (1912–1913), husband of Amelia Earhart
- Laurenne Ross, skier, Olympian
- Les Schwab, founder of Les Schwab Tire Centers
- Derek Sitter, actor/filmmaker and founder of the Volcanic Theatre Pub

== Sister cities ==
Bend has multiple sister cities:

- Fujioka Town (Toyota City), Aichi Japan
- Condega, Nicaragua
- Muzaffarabad, Pakistan
- Belluno, Veneto, Italy

== See also ==
- List of people from Bend, Oregon
- Sisters, Oregon
