= Timeline of Crayola =

The following is a partial timeline of Crayola's history. It covers the Crayola brand of marking utensils, as well as the history of Binney & Smith, the company that created the brand and is currently a subsidiary of Hallmark Cards known as Crayola LLC.

== List of events ==
=== 1864–1900 ===
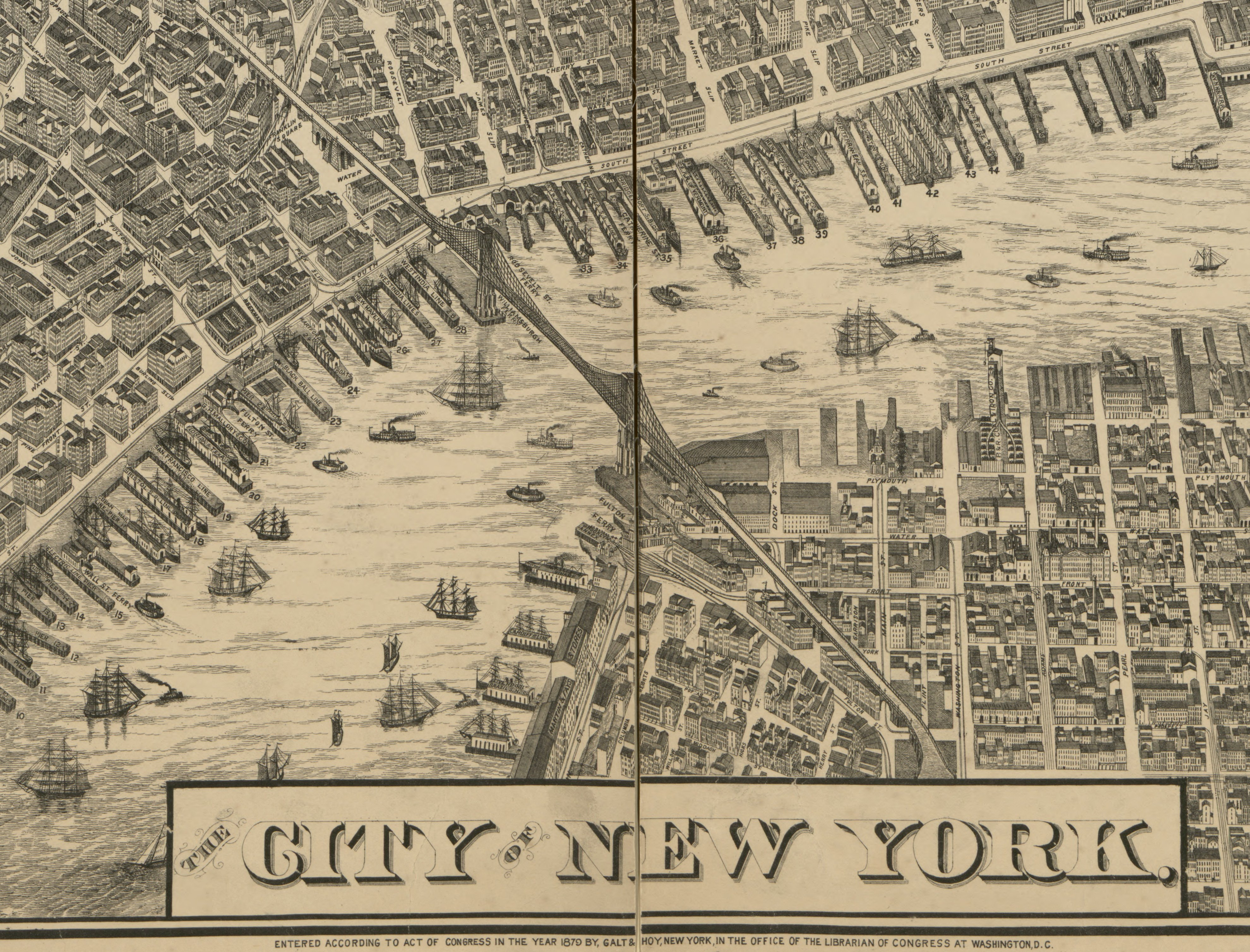
The NYC headquarters is visible on the left side of the Taylor map

- 1864:
  - Joseph Binney founds Peekskill Chemical Works in Peekskill, New York, for producing carbon black.
- 1880:
  - Joseph Binney sets up headquarters in New York City on 147 Maiden Ln, joined by son Edwin Binney and nephew C. Harold Smith.
- 1885:
  - Joseph Binney retires; Edwin and C. Harold Smith, form a partnership and call their company Binney & Smith. Early products include red oxide pigment used in barn paint and carbon black used for car tires. During this time, Binney & Smith took an active role in the development and production of carbon black from natural gas, after natural gas deposits were found throughout Pennsylvania.
- 1889:
  - Binney & Smith made yellow oxide pigment; the company produces three colors: Carbon black, yellow, and red.

=== 1900–1950 ===
- 1900:
  - The company begins producing slate school pencils in its newly opened Easton, Pennsylvania mill.
  - Their carbon black wins the Gold Medal at the Paris Exposition.
- 1902:
  - "Binney & Smith Company" is formed September 30, in Easton, Pennsylvania, and serves as general distributor for several carbon black producers, introducing Carbon black to other countries. This also marks their first crayon product, the industry crayon "Staonal" in black. This crayon precedes the Crayola brand by a full year and still exists to this year.
- 1903:
  - Noticing a need for safe, quality, and affordable wax crayons, the company produces their first boxes of crayons from the No. 30 box containing 30 unwrapped colors to the No. 51 box of 28 wrapped colors. The No. 54 box contains 8 classic colors and the first one sells for a nickel. A total of 40 colors are introduced including Black, Blue (I) (later Celestial Blue, then Azure Blue, later retired in 1958), Brown, Burnt Sienna, Burnt Umber (later retired in 1944), Celestial Blue (later retired in 1910), Charcoal Gray (later retired in 1910), Cobalt Blue (later retired in 1958), Copper, Dark Blue (later Prussian Blue, then Midnight Blue), Dark Chrome Green (later retired in 1949, reintroduced in 1958, as Pine Green), English Vermillion (later retired in 1935), Flesh Tint (later Flesh, then Pink Beige, then Flesh again, and then Peach), Gold (I) (later retired in 1944), Golden Ochre (later Gold Ochre then Maize, later retired in 1990) Green, Indian Red (later Chestnut), Lemon Yellow (was once later Light Yellow, later retired in 1990), Light Chrome Green (later retired in 1935), Madder Lake (later retired in 1935), Medium Chrome Green (later retired in 1939), Medium Yellow (later Goldenrod), Olive Green, Orange, Permanent Geranium Lake (later retired in 1910), Permanent Magenta (later Magenta), Raw Sienna, Raw Umber (later retired in 1990), Red, Rose Pink (later Carnation Pink), Sea Green, Sepia, Silver, Ultramarine Blue (later retired in 1944), Van Dyke brown (later retired in 1910), Venetian Red (later retired in 1944), Violet (I) (later retired in 1930), White, and Yellow.
- 1904:
  - Binney & Smith wins the Gold Medal during the April 1904 St. Louis World's Fair. Their entry was actually for their An-Du-Septic dustless chalk, but it was the foundation of their "Gold Medal" packaging in which they featured the gold medal on the front of their crayon boxes for the next 50 or so years. Given that this award wasn't given out until April 1904 and Crayola had been selling since August 1903, it is a misconception that the famous box shown on the postage stamp and in numerous other historical articles and web pages is "the" actual first design of their Crayola boxes because the box shown in all of those pictures has that Gold Medal on the front.
- 1905:
  - Binney redesigns their 8-color assortment to use the famous "Gold Medal" label and design. They also renamed the box to be the No. 8, following an earlier such introduction by the Franklin Mfg. Co. for their Rainbow line of crayons. This first and only Gold Medal box used the Eagle side of the Gold Medal and was the only assortment size to use this side of the medal, as it was changed to the other side before they expanded the line to other assortment sizes in 1910. This also marks the year that they introduced Spectra, a pastel crayon line.
- 1907:
  - Binney & Smith partnered with Milton Bradley to produce the Crayola No. 77 assortment box with Milton Bradley printed on the box also.
- 1908:
  - Binney & Smith partnered with Littlefield Maps to make a special color assortment of their Rubens-Crayola No. 12 box with special Biblical colors pasted on the back to accommodate church work on their Old Testament maps.
- 1909:
  - Binney & Smith launched their Durel line of pressed crayons.
- 1910:
  - Binney & Smith expands their Gold Medal line to include the debut of their No. 16 box (which also followed an earlier debut of a 16-color assortment by Franklin Mfg. Co.). They also discontinued many of their original boxes in favor of standardizing more to this Gold Medal line.
  - Seven crayon colors are discontinued: Charcoal Gray, Dark Venetian Red, Permanent Geranium Lake, Celestial Blue, Light Pink, Light Venetian Red, and Van Dyke Brown.
  - Raw Sienna is unavailable until 1958.
- 1911:
  - Binney & Smith launch their Cerola brand of crayons targeted toward the lower end quality but more affordable markets.
- 1912:
  - Binney & Smith's carbon black is first used on tires to make black tires. They also launched their Cerata brand of crayons.
- 1913:
  - Marks the launch of the Little Folks outfit boxes (Nos. 25 & 50) along with a Picture Tracer box.
- 1915:
  - The Boston crayon line debuts. This also marks the discontinuation of the No. 101 assortment box that contained Gold, Silver and Copper crayon colors. While Gold and Silver was available as a bulk purchase, these three original colors couldn't be found on a retail assortment box for the next 30 years. Copper is unavailable until 1958.
- 1919:
  - The design of their Gold Medal boxes is changed to drop the Paris reference. They also launch their No. 88 8-color tins.
- 1920:
  - Perma Pressed Sharpenable Fine Art Crayons are added to the growing product line, which also includes new Artista brand paints.
- 1922:
  - Binney & Smith expand their Little Folks outfit concept by introducing a number of Toy Sets with specific themes. Included in the launch are Crayola Color Kit for Kiddies (No. 508), Crayola Crusader Box (No. 503), Crayola Snowbound Color Box (No. 500), Crayola Dream Stories Color Set (No. 501), Crayola Home Run Color Box (No. 503), Crayola Little Boy Blue Paint Box (No. 501), Crayola Color it and Trace it Outfit (No. 502), Crayola Bird-Land Color Set (No. 516), Crayola Chummy Animals Color Set (No. 510), Uncle Wiggily Crayola Color Box (No. 506), Crayola Golden Treasure Color Set (No. 518), Crayola Rob Roy Color Box (No. 513). While attractive and theme driven, they later concluded that the higher cost made these some of their least successful products.
- 1923:
  - Corporate offices move from 81–83 Fulton St. to 41 East 42nd Street in New York City.
- 1924:
  - Perma and Tiny Tot crayon lines were introduced.
- 1926:
  - Binney & Smith launch their Perma and Crayolet crayon lines. They also begin publishing their bi-monthly art publication “The Drawing Teacher”
  - The Munsell crayon color line is introduced. The colors are: Maximum Red, Middle Red, Middle Yellow Red, Maximum Yellow Red (later retired in 1944, reintroduced in 1949, as Medium Orange), Middle Yellow, Maximum Yellow, Maximum Green Yellow, Middle Green Yellow, Maximum Green, Middle Green, Middle Blue Green, Maximum Blue Green, Middle Blue, Maximum Blue, Maximum Blue Purple, Middle Blue Purple, Maximum Purple, Middle Purple, Maximum Red Purple, Middle Red Purple, and Middle Gray (later Neutral Gray then Gray).

The rest of the colors were retired in 1944, except for Middle Gray.

- 1927:
  - Binney & Smith Co. launch the Snookum's Crayola Color Set No. 25 based on the popular baby actor who died of blood poisoning several years later at the age of 7
  - Binney & Smith Co. launch the Besco line and redesign their Gold Medal boxes to remove the ornate scrolling.
- 1929:
  - Binney & Smith Co. discontinues all of their Toy Sets and Color Outfits except their Little Folks No. 25 and No. 50.
- 1930:
  - Binney & Smith Co. launches their Chic’ago line of pastel crayons,
  - Five new crayon colors are released: Blue Violet, Red Orange, Red Violet, Violet (II), and Yellow Green.
  - Middle Gray is renamed Neutral Gray.
  - Violet (I) is discontinued.
- 1931:
  - C. Harold Smith, co-founder of Binney & Smith Co. dies.
- 1934:
  - Edwin Binney, co-founder of Binney & Smith Co. dies.
- 1935:
  - Three new crayon colors are released: Carmine (later Carmine Red, later retired in 1958), Blue (II) (later Medium Blue, later retired in 1958), and Turquoise Blue.
  - Three crayon colors are discontinued: English Vermillion, Light Chrome Green, and Madder Lake.
  - Blue (I) is renamed Celestial Blue.
- 1936:
  - Binney & Smith becomes a founding member of the Crayon, Watercolor and Craft Institute, promoting product safety in art materials.
- 1939:
  - The Medium Green crayon is discontinued.
- 1941:
  - The Gamboge Yellow crayon is released.
- 1944:
  - Burnt Umber, Gold (I), Ultramarine Blue, and Venetian Red are discontinued.
  - Sepia is unavailable until 1958.
  - The Munsell crayon line is discontinued.
  - The Gamboge Yellow Crayon is discontinued due to World War II-era pigment shortages.
- 1948:
  - To educate art teachers about the many ways to use the growing number of Crayola products, a teacher workshop program begins to offer in-school training across the country.
- 1949:
  - Crayola releases its first 48-count box this year. 17 new crayon colors are added: Azure Blue (later retired in 1958), Blue (III), Blue-Green, Brilliant Rose (later retired in 1958), Cerulean Blue (later retired in 1958), Dark Red (later Maroon), Dark Green (later Forest Green), Lavender (I) (later retired in 1958), Light Green (later Sea Green), Light Magenta (later Thistle, later retired in 1999), Mahogany, Medium Blue (later retired in 1958), Medium Red Violet (later Orchid), Medium Rose (later retired in 1958), Medium Violet (later retired in 1958), Salmon, and Violet (later Blue-Violet). Six crayon colors are discontinued: Celestial Blue, Blue (II), Dark Chrome Green (reintroduced in 1958, as Pine Green), and Violet (II) (reintroduced in 1958).

=== 1950–1990 ===
- 1952:
  - A Binney & Smith factory in Winfield, Kansas opens to handle the company's growing business.
- 1953:
  - Binney & Smith Co. moves their headquarters to 380 Madison Ave in New York city.
  - The Gold (II) crayon is released.
- 1955:
  - Binney & Smith incorporates and changes their packaging from "Binney & Smith Co." to

"Binney & Smith Inc."

- 1956:
  - Neutral Gray is renamed Gray.
- 1958:
  - The 64-color assortment of Crayola crayons—with a built-in sharpener—is released.
  - Prussian blue is changed to Midnight Blue because of Prussia by then being an extinct country for decades.
  - 19 new colors are introduced: Bittersweet, Burnt Orange, Orange-Yellow (later retired in 1990) , Green-Yellow, Spring Green, Light Blue (for a limited time only) , Sky Blue, Cornflower, Green-Blue (later retired in 1990), Navy Blue, Cadet Blue, Periwinkle, Plum, Mulberry (later retired in 2003), Violet-Red, Melon, Tan, Apricot, and Blue-Gray (later retired in 1990).
- 1959:
  - The first Crayola TV ads appear during the children's TV show Ding Dong School.
  - In the 64-count box of crayons, two colors are discontinued and replaced by others: "Brilliant Rose" by "Magenta," and "Light Blue" by "Turquoise Blue."
- 1961:
  - Binney & Smith becomes a publicly traded company.
- 1962:
  - The color "Flesh" is renamed "Peach" completing an odd transition from Flesh-Tint to Flesh to Pink Beige, back to Flesh and finally to Peach.
- 1963:
  - Binney & Smith becomes a member of the American Stock Exchange on May 1, with the symbol: BYS.
- 1964:
  - Crayola acquires Permanent Pigments Inc., producers of Liquitex art materials.
- 1969:
  - The company opens an additional factory in Easton, Pennsylvania, followed five years later by a new corporate headquarters.
- 1972:
  - Binney & Smith Inc. purchases the Cosmic Crayon Co. in Bedford, UK and uses its facilities for their European operation by making it Binney & Smith (Europe), Ltd.
  - Binney & Smith adds eight Fluorescent colors (All of which are later renamed): Ultra Pink (later Shocking Pink), Hot Magenta (later Razzle Dazzle Rose), Ultra Red (later Wild Watermelon), Ultra Orange (later Outrageous Orange), Ultra Yellow (later Atomic Tangerine), Chartreuse (later Laser Lemon), Ultra Green (later Screamin' Green) and Ultra Blue (later Blizzard Blue, retired in 2003). 72 colors are included in the biggest box of crayons.
  - Binney & Smith Inc. opens their Mexico operations, Binney & Smith Mexicol, S.A.
- 1975:
  - Fire destroys the Binney & Smith Bedford factory on Aug 10. A new factory was built and operational by October.
- 1976:
  - Binney & Smith corporate headquarters relocate from New York City to Forks Township in Easton, Pennsylvania.
- 1977:
  - Binney & Smith buys Silly Putty.
- 1978:
  - Binney & Smith is listed on the New York Stock Exchange on June 19, with the symbol: BYS.
  - Crayola crayons celebrate their 75th anniversary, and Crayola markers are introduced. Craft and activity kits become a vital part of the company's business.
- 1979:
  - All children's product lines are repackaged to carry the Crayola trade name and all fine art materials are repackaged to carry the Liquitex trade name.
- 1980:
  - A private distributorship in Australia is purchased to form Binney & Smith (Australia) Pty. Ltd. to market and distribute finished Crayola products.
- 1984:
  - Binney & Smith becomes a wholly owned subsidiary of gift and greeting card seller Hallmark Cards Inc., of Kansas City, Missouri.
  - Crayola DREAM-MAKERS art education program is introduced in the nation's elementary schools.
- 1987:
  - Crayola introduces washable markers.
  - Crayola's GemTones and colored pencils also arrive.
  - The 1-800-CRAYOLA toll-free number is added to all packaging.

=== 1990–2000 ===
- 1990:
  - Eight crayon colors—Maize, Raw Umber, Lemon Yellow, Blue Gray, Orange Yellow, Orange Red, Green Blue and Violet Blue—are retired into the Crayola Hall of Fame in Easton, Pennsylvania. 16 new colors were introduced: Cerulean, Dandelion (later retired in 2017), Electric Lime, Fuchsia, Hot Magenta, Jungle Green, Magic Mint (later retired in 2003), Neon Carrot, Purple Pizzazz, Radical Red, Royal Purple, Sunglow, Unmellow Yellow, Vivid Tangerine, Teal Blue (later retired in 2003), and Wild Strawberry. 80 colors are in the biggest box of crayons.
  - Crayola also introduces Silver Swirls crayons, a pack of 24 silvery colors.
  - Various colors were renamed: Ultra Yellow was renamed Atomic Tangerine, Ultra Blue was renamed Blizzard Blue (retired in 2003), Chartreuse was renamed Laser Lemon, Ultra Orange was renamed Outrageous Orange, Hot Magenta (I) was renamed Razzle Dazzle Rose, Ultra Green was renamed Screamin' Green, Ultra Pink was renamed Shocking Pink, and Ultra Red was renamed Wild Watermelon.
  - Emerson Moser, then Crayola's most senior crayon moulder, retired after 37 years. After moulding approximately 1.4 billion crayons, he revealed that he is actually blue–green color blind.
- 1991:
  - The eight crayon colors retired in 1990 are put into tins with a 64-count box for a limited time.
  - Crayola Washable crayons are introduced.
- 1992:
  - Crayola introduces Model Magic, a modeling compound, into its long line of products.
  - Crayola releases an 8-pack of multicultural crayon colors.
- 1993:
  - Binney & Smith celebrates the Crayola brand's 90th birthday with its biggest crayon box ever, with 96 colors in the biggest box of crayons, including 16 new colors. For the first time, the company asks consumers to name the colors through the Crayola Name the New Colors Contest: the winning names include Asparagus, Cerise, Denim, Granny Smith Apple, Macaroni and Cheese, Pacific Blue, Purple Mountain's Majesty, Razzmatazz, Robin's Egg Blue, Shamrock, Tickle Me Pink, Timberwolf, Tropical Rain Forest, Mauvelous, Tumbleweed, and Wisteria. Color Wonder products debuted; Hot Fluorescent crayon boxes (8 and 16) are renamed Neons.
- 1994:
  - Crayola introduces Gem Tones and a scented version of crayons called Magic Scents Crayons.
- 1995:
  - Crayola introduces Changeables.
  - Crayola changes some of the scents in Magic Scent crayons due to complaints of their smelling good enough to eat (e.g. Cherry, Chocolate, Blueberry)
- 1996:
  - The 100 billionth Crayola crayon rolls off the production line in Easton. The wax for that crayon was poured by Mister Rogers.
  - On July 16, Binney & Smith celebrates the grand opening of The Crayola Factory visitors' center in Easton with the Crayola ColorJam parade.
- 1997:
  - All Crayola products receive new logo design for the year.
  - Crayola introduces Color Mix-up, Pearl Brite, Crayons with Glitter and Star Brite.
  - 12 new colors are introduced: Caribbean Green, Pink Flamingo, Sunset Orange, True Blue Heroes Crayon Color #1 (later Outer Space), True Blue Heroes Crayon Color #2 (later Mountain Meadow), True Blue Heroes Crayon Color #3 (later Fuzzy Wuzzy Brown then Fuzzy Wuzzy), True Blue Heroes Crayon Color #4 (later Brink Pink then Pink Sherbert), True Blue Heroes Crayon Color #5 (later Shadow), True Blue Heroes Crayon Color #6 (later Banana Mania), True Blue Heroes Crayon Color #7 (later Torch Red then Scarlet), True Blue Heroes Crayon Color #8 (later Purple Heart), and Vivid Violet.
- 1998:
  - The Crayola 64 Box celebrates its 40th anniversary and is reintroduced in its original packaging, complete with built-in sharpener. A 1958 Crayola 64 Box becomes part of the Smithsonian Institution's National Museum of American History. Crayola also brings back the original 8 retired colors in the 1958 Crayola 64 Box for a limited time.
  - The True Blue Heroes colors got their actual color names.
  - 12 new colors are introduced: Almond, Antique Brass, Beaver, Blue Bell, Canary, Cotton Candy, Cranberry (later Blush), Desert Sand, Eggplant, Fern, Manatee, and Piggy Pink. 120 colors are in the biggest box of crayons.
  - The Crayola 12 pack of Twistable Colored Pencils is released.
  - The Crayola 8 pack of Silly Scents Colored Pencils is released.
- 1999:
  - For the third time in Crayola history, a crayon is renamed because of social concerns. Indian red becomes "chestnut" because teachers reported that schoolchildren often wrongly perceived the color to be the skin color of Native Americans. The name in fact did not refer to Native Americans, but to a pigment produced in India and used in oil paints.
  - Another crayon color—Thistle—is retired into the Crayola Hall of Fame, totaling 45 retired colors and replaced by newcomer Indigo. There are still 120 colors available.
  - Torch Red is renamed Scarlet.

=== 2000–2009 ===
- 2001:
  - Crayola introduces Metallic FX Crayons and Gel FX crayons.
- 2002:
  - Crayola introduces Glitter Crayons.
  - Crayola introduces the Crayon Maker.
- 2003:
  - Four more crayon colors—Blizzard Blue, Magic Mint, Mulberry, and Teal Blue—are retired into the Crayola Hall of Fame, totaling 49 retired colors and replaced by Inchworm, Jazzberry Jam, Mango Tango, and Wild Blue Yonder. There are still 120 colors available.
  - Crayola releases a limited-edition Retired Colors 12 pack that includes the 8 retired colors from 1990, plus the 4 newly retired colors from 2003. This is the second time they have brought back a group of colors out of retirement, ever since 1991.
  - The Crayola factory in Bedford, England closes its doors.
- 2004:
  - Crayola introduces the 24-color set of mini twistable crayons.
  - Crayola introduces the 24-color set of Fun Effects mini twistable crayons containing 8 regular colors, 8 rainbow colors, and 8 eXtreme colors.
- 2005:
  - Cranberry is renamed Blush, Brink Pink is renamed Pink Sherbert, and Fuzzy Wuzzy Brown is renamed Fuzzy Wuzzy.
- 2006:
  - Crayola introduces Heads n' Tails Crayons.
  - The Crayola 150-count Telescoping Crayon Tower is released.
- 2007:
  - On January 1, Binney & Smith is renamed to Crayola LLC, to improve Crayola branding as part of Hallmark.
  - Crayola introduces Silly Scents and True To Life Crayons.
- 2008:
  - The Crayola 18 pack vibrant set of Twistable Colored Pencils is released.
  - The Crayola 64 pack of short colored pencils is released.
  - Crayola introduces the Kids Choice Crayons.
  - Crayola celebrates its 50th anniversary of the 64 Box and re-releases its original 1958 Crayola 64 Box, containing all original colors from 1958, with the 8 crayons retired in 1990, including Thistle, and Mulberry, which were retired in 1999 and 2003 respectively and were available during 1958.
- 2009:
  - Crayola introduces Extreme Twistables Colors.
  - The Crayola 30 pack of Twistable Colored Pencils is released.

=== 2010–2019 ===
- 2011:
  - The Crayola Solar Farm is completed and included more than 30,000 solar panels producing 3 megawatts of electricity. The solar panels generate enough electricity to produce 1 billion crayons and 500 million markers per year.
  - The Crayola 12 pack of Ultra Cool and Super Hot colored pencils is released.
- 2013:
  - Crayola introduces the Marker Maker.
- 2014:
  - Crayola introduces Ultra-Clean Washable crayons and markers, featuring ColorMax: "Our brightest, truest colors yet!" Also, The Crayola 152-count Easy-choose container is released
- 2017:

The 1990 - 2004 version of the Dandelion crayon

  - The classic Dandelion crayon was retired into the Crayola Hall of Fame, totalling 50 retired colors and replaced by Bluetiful in September 2017.
- 2019:
  - Crayola introduces the 24-count Pearl Crayons alongside the upgraded 24-count boxes of Metallic, Neon and Glitter Crayons. Metallic FX was reverted to its original name Metallic Crayons for this release, with eight new colors and the color Metallic Sunburst being renamed to Robot Canary.

=== 2020–present ===
- 2020:
  - Crayola introduces the "Colors of the World" 24-count crayon box in an effort to provide children with many different backgrounds access to crayons that are reflective of their own skin tone.
  - Crayola introduces the Confetti Crayons. That same year, the first big boxes of Special Effects Crayons consisting of Glitter, Metallic, Neon, Pearl (all in the 96-count and 120-count boxes), and Confetti (only in the 120-count box) were introduced.
- 2021:
  - Crayola introduces the Colors of Kindness crayon line, debuting four new colors: Cool Mint, Crayellow, Oatmeal, and Powder Blue. The colored pencil and marker versions were introduced soon after.
  - The 24-count Cosmic Crayons made its pre-debut in November.
- 2022:
  - Crayola released an updated version of the Construction Paper Crayons called Bold and Bright Construction Paper Crayons which comes in 24 colors.
  - Crayola officially introduced the 24-count Cosmic Crayons in spring, with the color Uranian Winter renamed as Winter Solstice. The second version of the 96- and 120-count Special Effects crayons line were released, with the Cosmic Crayons taking over the Glitter Crayons' place in the boxes.
- 2023:
  - Crayola updates and re-releases the 24-count boxes of Neon Crayons, Confetti Crayons, and Cosmic Crayons. In February, the 24-count Pastel Crayons were introduced, retiring the Pearl Crayons line.
- 2024:
  - Crayola releases the Swirl Crayons line, along with Swirl Twistable Crayons and Swirl Colored Pencils. They are nearly identical to the Confetti Crayons line, with some few differences, such as replaced colors.
- 2025:
  - Crayola re-releases 8 previously retired crayon colors for a limited-time. These colors include Dandelion, Mulberry, Blizzard Blue, Raw Umber, Lemon Yellow, Orange Red, Violet Blue, and Magic Mint. They are also available in colored pencil and marker form. This is the third time that Crayola has brought back a group of colors out of retirement, ever since 1991, 1998, 2003, and 2008.
  - Crayola heavily promotes the Neon Crayons line, and releases new Neon products, such as Neon Colored Pencils and Neon Markers.
  - Crayola collaborates with Easton, Pennsylvanian college Lafayette College to make a limited-edition 64-pack of crayons in celebration of the college's bicentennial. The box features the college's bicentennial logo and four custom colors that each represent a trait of the college, such as its school colors and mascot. These colors include Marquis Maroon, Golden Leopard, Cur Non Royal, and Day on the Quad, all of which include a metallic effect.
- 2026:
  - The Dandelion crayon is brought back.

== See also ==
- History of Crayola crayons
- List of Crayola crayon colors
