= History of Crayola crayons =

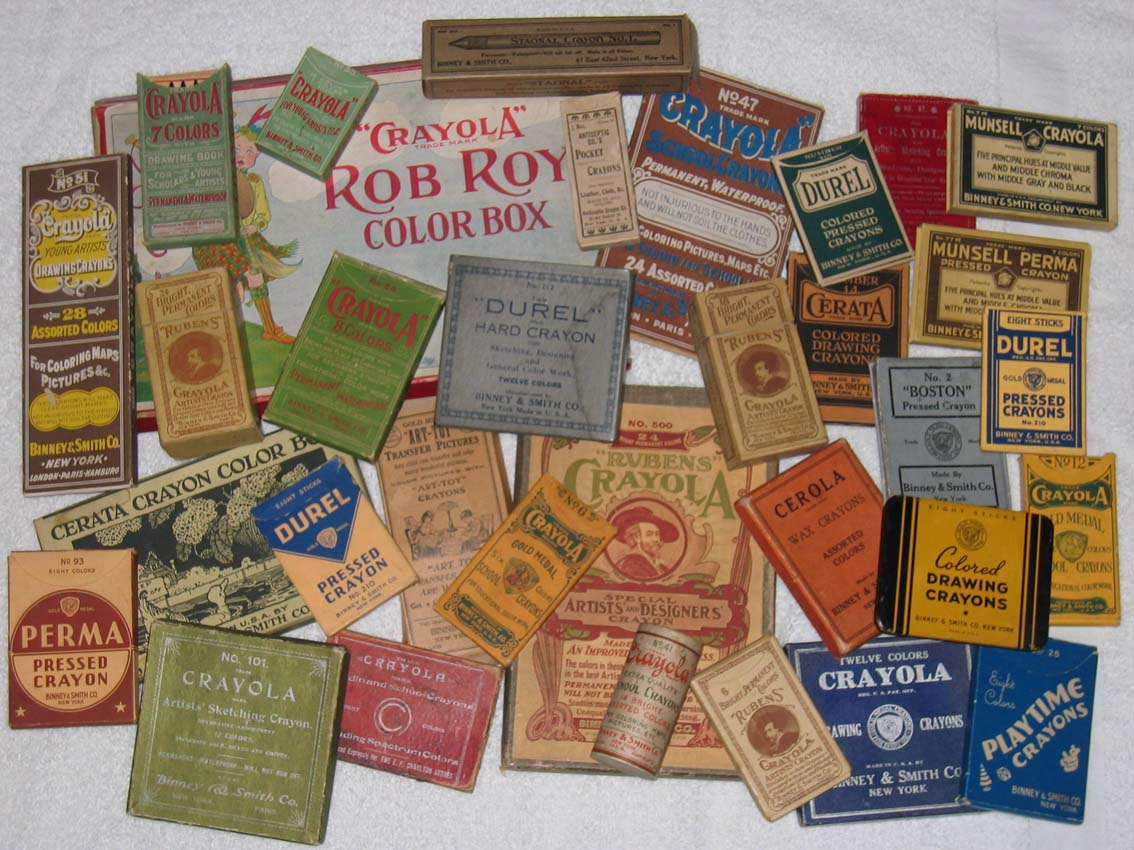
An assortment of crayon boxes produced by Binney Smith between 1903 and 1910

Since the introduction of Crayola drawing crayons by Binney & Smith in 1903, more than 200 colors have been produced in a wide variety of assortments. The line has undergone several major revisions, notably in 1935, 1949, 1958, and 1990. Numerous specialty crayons have also been produced, complementing the basic Crayola assortment.

== 1903: the original Crayola colors ==
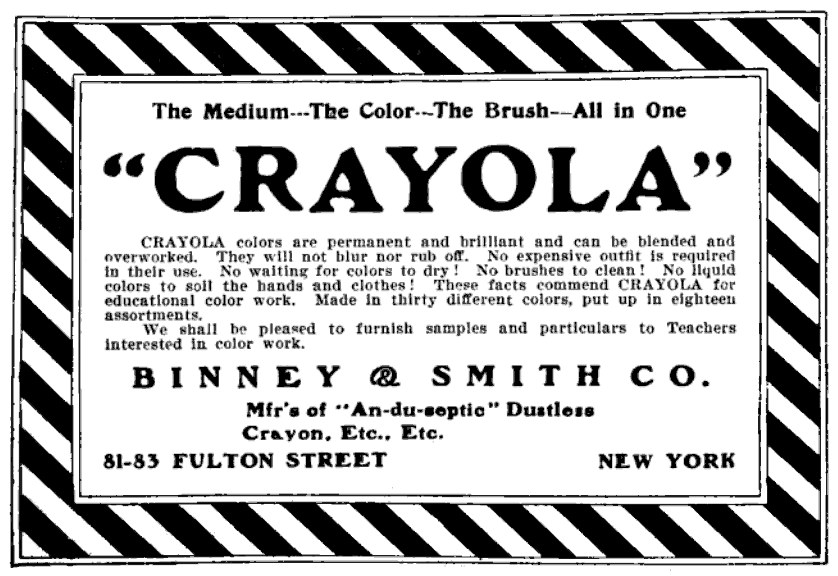
A Crayola ad from 1905

After several decades producing commercial pigments, Binney & Smith produced their first crayon, the black Staonal Marking Crayon, in 1902. The following year, the company decided to enter the consumer market with its first drawing crayons. The name Crayola was suggested by Alice Binney, wife of company founder Edwin Binney, combining craie, French for "chalk," a reference to the pastels that preceded and lent their name to the first drawing crayons, with the suffix -ola, meaning "oleaginous," a reference to the wax from which the crayons were made. Initially this was just one of the brands produced by Binney & Smith; other crayons were produced under names such as Cerola, Cerata, Durel, Perma, and Boston, among others; but the Crayola brand proved the most successful, and was produced in two lines: Crayola Gold Medal School Crayons and "Rubens" Crayola Artists' Crayons.

Early Crayola advertising mentions thirty different colors, although there is no official list; in fact thirty-eight different crayons are known from Crayola boxes of this period. (Note: This discrepancy may be due to the fact that several crayons were simply different shades of other colors; for example Chrome Green came in light, medium, and dark; in addition to Venetian Red there were Light and Dark Venetian Red; Chrome Yellow came in both light and dark varieties.) The largest labeled assortment was box No. 51, titled Crayola Young Artists' Drawing Crayons, which included twenty-eight different crayons. (Note: Crayola No. 100 contained thirty crayons, but they were not labeled.) Other colors were found in different boxes, including the "Rubens" No. 500, a twenty-four crayon assortment. The names of several crayons varied from box to box; in general the larger assortments tended to use names associated with oil paints, and in fact early Crayola literature frequently describes drawing with crayons as a form of painting.

Over time, simpler names were favored, and several colors were discontinued by 1910, including Light and Dark Venetian Red, Permanent Geranium Lake, Celestial Blue, Raw Sienna, and Charcoal Gray; the use of "Purple" as an alternative for "Violet" ended about 1914; and after 1915 Gold, Silver, and Copper were no longer available in assortments, although Gold and Silver were still available in bulk.

Color (Note: Due to several factors, the values given should only be considered approximations. The apparent color of any crayon depends on the thickness with which the wax is laid down, the color and brightness of the surface being colored, and other considerations, such as the age and quality of individual crayons. In addition, crayons are produced using pigments, which are normally described using subtractive colors, with the primary colors of red, yellow, and blue; but electronic displays produce colors using the additive method, combining the primary colors of red, green, and blue.)	Name	Hex code (Note: Unless otherwise indicated, the hex colors were found in the source code of the Crayola website.)	Notes (Note: Unless otherwise indicated, notes regarding color names and years of use in this table are sourced to "Alphabetical List of Crayon Colors" page at Ed Welter's website)
	Red	#ED0A3F	
	English Vermilion	#CC474B	Also spelled "Vermillion." Discontinued by 1935
	Madder Lake	#CC3336	Discontinued by 1935
	Permanent Geranium Lake	#E12C2C	Discontinued by 1910.
	Indian Red	#CD5C5C	Same color as "Chestnut" (1999–present).
	Dark Venetian Red	#B33B24	"Venetian Red, Dark" on labels. Discontinued by 1910.
	Venetian Red	#C80815	Discontinued by 1949
	Light Venetian Red	#E6735C	"Venetian Red, Light" on labels. Discontinued by 1910.
	Orange	#FF8833	
	Gold Ochre	#F2C649	"Golden Ochre" on some labels. Same color as "Maize" (1958–1990).
	Medium Chrome Yellow	#FCD667	Same color as "Medium Yellow" (1903–1958) and "Goldenrod" (1958–present).
	Yellow	#FFFF00	
	Olive Green	#B5B35C	
	Light Chrome Yellow	#FFFF9F (Note: Swatch matches the hue of "Laser Lemon" and "Unmellow Yellow.")	On labels "Chrome Yellow, Light." Same color as "Light Yellow" (1903–1958) and "Lemon Yellow" (1903–1910, 1958–1990).
	Light Chrome Green	#BEE64B	"Chrome Green, Light" on labels. Same color as "Light Green" (1903–1935).
	Green	#008001	
	Medium Chrome Green	#6CA67C	"Chrome Green, Medium" on labels. Same color as "Medium Green" (1903–1939).
	Dark Chrome Green	#01786F	"Chrome Green, Dark" on labels. Same color as "Dark Green" (1903–1949) and "Pine Green" (1958–present).
	Blue	#2EB4E6	Same color as "Celestial Blue" (1930–1949) and "Azure Blue" (1949–1958).
	Prussian Blue	#00468C (Note: The digital swatch provided by Crayola gives the values 0, 51, 102, considerably darker than the actual crayon.)	Same color as "Midnight Blue" (1958–present).
	Cobalt Blue	#0047AB	Discontinued by 1958
	Celestial Blue	#4997D0	Discontinued by 1944
	Ultramarine Blue	#4166F5	Discontinued by 1958
	Purple (Violet)	#6A0DAD	"Violet" from about 1914.
	Permanent Magenta	#F653A6	Same color as "Magenta" (1903–present).
	Rose Pink	#FF66CC	Same color as "Pink" (1903–1917) and "Carnation Pink" (1958–present).
	Burnt Sienna	#E97451	
	Van Dyke Brown	#664228	Same color as "Brown" (1903–1935).
	Flesh Tint	#FFCBA4	Same color as "Flesh" (1949–1956, 1958–1962), "Pink Beige" (1956–1958), and "Peach" (1962–present).
	Burnt Umber	#8A3324	Discontinued by 1949
	Raw Umber	#826644	One of the 8 colors "Retired" in 1990
	Raw Sienna	#D68A59	Discontinued by 1910.
	Gold	#A57C00	Metallic; swatch represents nominal hue only. Available only in bulk after 1915.
	Silver	#AAA9AD	Metallic; swatch represents nominal hue only. Available only in bulk after 1915.
	Copper	#B87333	Metallic; swatch represents nominal hue only. Not Available between 1915 and 1950
	Black	#000000	
	Charcoal Gray	#736A62	Discontinued in 1910.
	White	#FFFFFF	

== Munsell Crayola, 1926–1944 ==
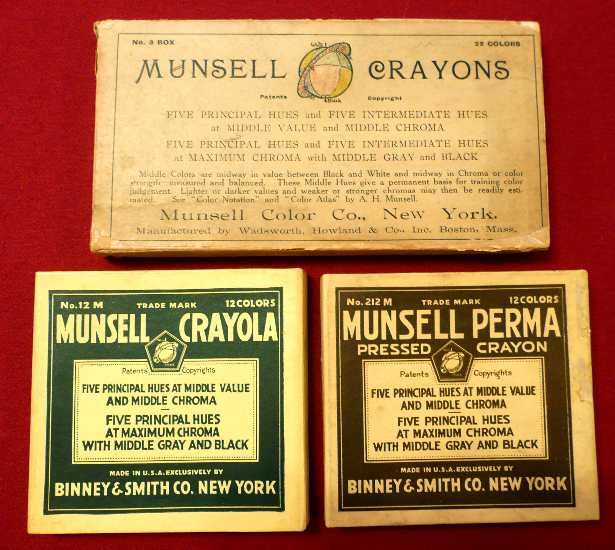
Three boxes of Munsell crayons; the first from the Munsell Color Company, and the others from Binney & Smith.

In 1926, Binney & Smith acquired the Munsell Color Company's line of crayons, based on the Munsell color system developed by Albert Henry Munsell. This marked the first time that Crayola crayons incorporated the concept of the color wheel. The Munsell color wheel consisted of five "principal hues" (red, yellow, green, blue, and purple), and five "intermediate hues" (yellow red, green yellow, blue green, blue purple, and red purple). Each color was available in either "maximum chroma" or with "middle value and middle chroma." Three different packages were offered: a box of seven containing the five principal hues at maximum chroma plus Middle Gray and Black, (Note: Although sometimes identified as "Maximum Black," Munsell wrappers and boxes simply identify this crayon as "Black." Since Black is achromatic and has no intermediate grades, there could be no "Middle Black" or "Maximum Black.") a box of twelve containing the five principal hues, both at maximum chroma and at middle value and chroma, plus Middle Gray and Black, and a box of twenty-two, containing both the principal and intermediate hues, each at maximum chroma as well as with middle value and chroma, plus Middle Gray and Black.

The Munsell color wheel prompted Binney & Smith to adopt a similar color wheel concept for Crayola crayons in 1930, using six principal hues (red, orange, yellow, green, blue, and violet) and six intermediate hues (red-orange, yellow-orange, yellow-green, blue-green, blue-violet, and red-violet), for a twelve-color wheel. These were combined with Black, Neutral Gray, White, and Brown to produce a sixteen-color box. Munsell Crayola boxes were discontinued in 1935, although the crayons were produced in specially-marked Crayola boxes until 1944, when wartime shortages made many of the pigments necessary for crayon production unavailable. Munsell crayons were not produced again after the war, but the concept of the color wheel pioneered by Munsell remained a fundamental part of the Crayola lineup until 1990.

The Munsell colors are depicted in the table below.

Color	Name	Hexadecimal	Notes
	Maximum Red	#D92121	
	Middle Red	#E58E73	
	Middle Yellow Red	#ECB176	Same color as "Medium Orange" (1949–1958).
	Maximum Yellow Red	#F2BA49	
	Middle Yellow	#FFEB00	
	Maximum Yellow	#FAFA37	
	Maximum Green Yellow	#D9E650	
	Middle Green Yellow	#ACBF60	
	Maximum Green	#5E8C31	
	Middle Green	#4D8C57	
	Middle Blue Green	#8DD9CC	
	Maximum Blue Green	#30BFBF	
	Middle Blue	#7ED4E6	
	Maximum Blue	#47ABCC	
	Maximum Blue Purple	#ACACE6	
	Middle Blue Purple	#8B72BE	
	Maximum Purple	#733380	
	Middle Purple	#D982B5	
	Maximum Red Purple	#A63A79	
	Middle Red Purple	#A55353	
	Middle Grey	#8B8680	Spelled "Grey" on labels, but "Gray" on boxes. Same color as "Neutral Grey" (1930–1956), "Gray" (1956–present).
	Black	#000000	References to "Maximum Black" are erroneous.

== Changes through 1949 ==
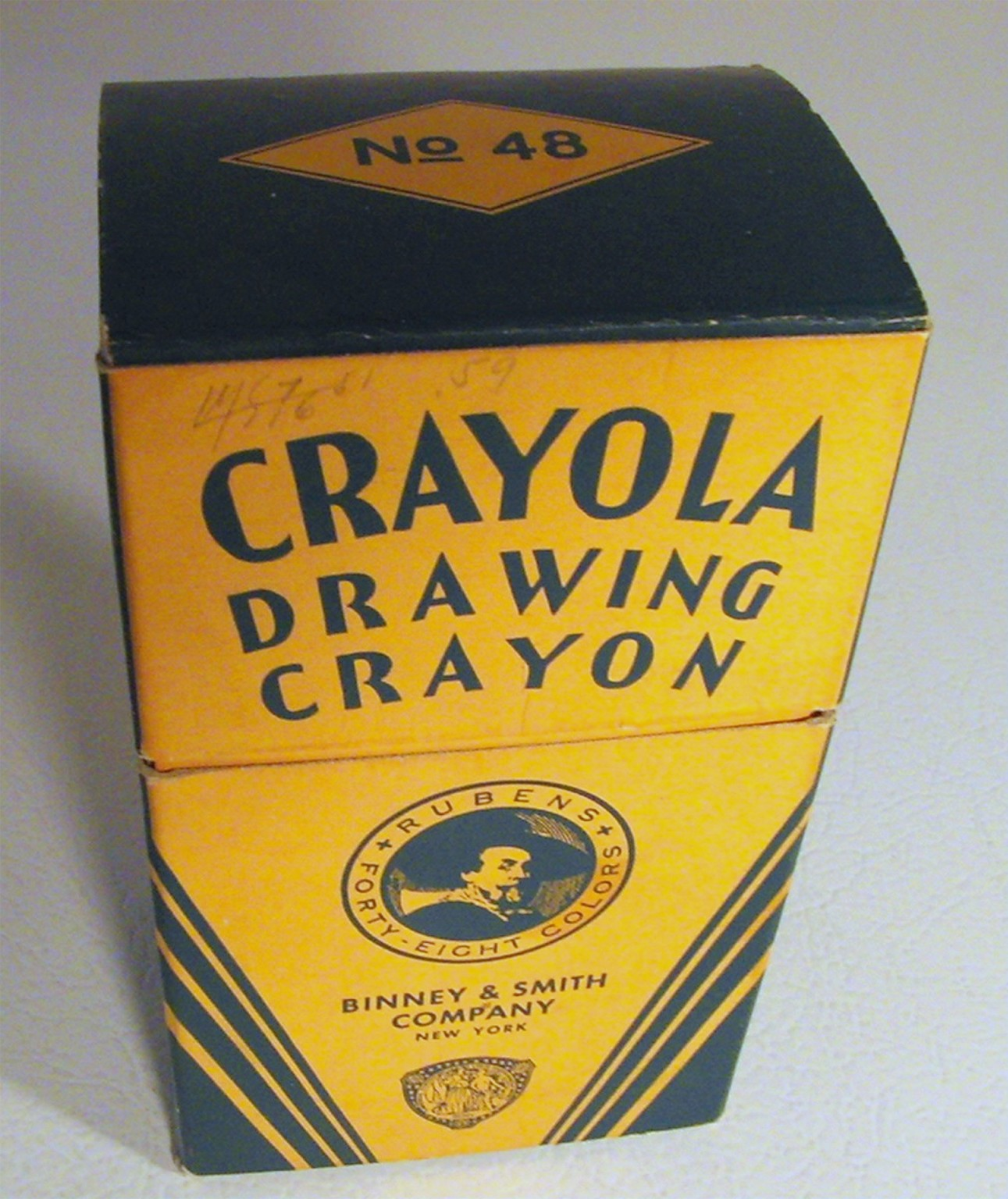
The Crayola No. 48, introduced in 1949. Note both the "Rubens" and "Gold Medal" emblems.

From 1930 to 1935, Binney & Smith refined the Crayola line-up, discontinuing some colors, adjusting others, and incorporating the Munsell colors into its regular line. In 1939, the company introduced the No. 52 assortment, containing fifty-two colors, including all of the Munsell colors and all but six of the other crayons then being produced. Although it was by far the largest Crayola assortment yet offered, the No. 52 received little publicity, and was only produced for about five years; in 1944, wartime shortages made the pigments necessary to produce many colors unavailable.

When full production was resumed in 1949, Binney & Smith eliminated most of the Munsell colors and their significant overlap with other hues. The new lineup was based around the twelve-color Crayola color wheel, first developed in the 1930s. While new crayons were added to the assortment, the overall number of colors dropped to forty-eight, and the No. 52 box was formally discontinued in favor of the new No. 48 assortment, containing all of the colors then being produced.

While many older crayons were eliminated from the Crayola line, several new colors representing light, medium, and dark shades of the principal and intermediate hues were added, to create the most systematic assortment yet produced. For ten years, the No. 48 box was Crayola's largest collection, and for decades afterward, it remained an integral part of the line.

Color	Name	Hexadecimal	Notes
	Red	#ED0A3F	
	Dark Red	#8B0000	Same color as "Maroon" (1958–present).
	Indian Red	#CD5C5C	Same color as "Chestnut" (1999–present).
	Red-Orange	#FF3F34	
	Orange	#FF8833	
	Medium Orange	#ECB176	Same color as "Middle Yellow Red" (1926–1949).
	Yellow-Orange	#FFAE42	
	Gold Ochre	#F2C649	Same color as "Maize" (1958–1990).
	Medium Yellow	#FCD667	Same color as "Medium Chrome Yellow" (1903–1910) and "Goldenrod" (1958–present).
	Yellow	#FFFF00	
	Olive Green	#B5B35C	
	Light Yellow	#FFFFE0	Same color as "Lemon Yellow" (1903–1910, 1958–1990).
	Yellow-Green	#9ACD32	
	Dark Green	#013220	Same color as "Forest Green" (1958–present).
	Light Green	#90EE90	Same color as "Sea Green" (1958–present).
	Green	#01A368	
	Light Turquoise Blue	#458B74 (Note: Crayola has digital swatches labeled "Aqua" and "Aqua Marine," but Aqua is much brighter and Aqua Marine much darker than Aquamarine, which should be a lighter version of Turquoise Blue.)	Same color as "Aquamarine" (1958–present).
	Turquoise Blue	#00FFEF	
	Middle Blue-Green	#0095B7	Same color as "Blue-Green" (1958–present).
	Blue-Green	#0D98BA	Same color as "Maximum Blue" (1926–1949)
	Azure Blue	#4997D0	Same color as "Blue" (1903–1935) and "Celestial Blue" (1930–1949).
	Cerulean Blue	#2A52BE	
	Prussian Blue	#003153	Same color as "Midnight Blue" (1958–present).
	Blue	#0066FF	
	Medium Blue	#0000CD	Same color as "Blue" (1935–1949).
	Cobalt Blue	#0047AB	
	Blue-Violet	#8A2BE2	Same color as "Violet-Blue" (1958–1990).
	Violet	#7F00FF	Same color as "Blue-Violet" (1958–present).
	Medium Violet	#65315F	
	Lavender	#B57EDC	
	Brilliant Rose	#E667CE	
	Medium Red-Violet	#BB3385	Same color as "Orchid" (1958–present).
	Medium Rose	#D96CBE	
	Light Magenta	#FF80FF	Same color as "Thistle" (1958–1999).
	Red-Violet	#C71585	
	Magenta	#FF00FF	Same color as "Permanent Magenta" (1903–1914).
	Rose Pink	#FF66CC	Same color as "Carnation Pink" (1958–present).
	Carmine Red	#FF0038	Same color as "Carmine" (1935–1949).
	Salmon	#FA8072	
	Mahogany	#C04000	
	Burnt Sienna	#E97451	
	Brown	#964B00	
	Flesh	#FFCBA4	Same color as "Flesh Tint" (1903–1949), "Pink Beige" (1956–1958), and Peach (1962–present).
	Raw Umber	#826644	
	Silver	#AAA9AD	Metallic; swatch represents nominal hue only.
	Black	#000000	
	Neutral Gray	#8B8680	Same color as "Middle Grey" (1926–1949), "Gray" (1956–present).
	White	#FFFFFF	

== Crayola No. 64 ==
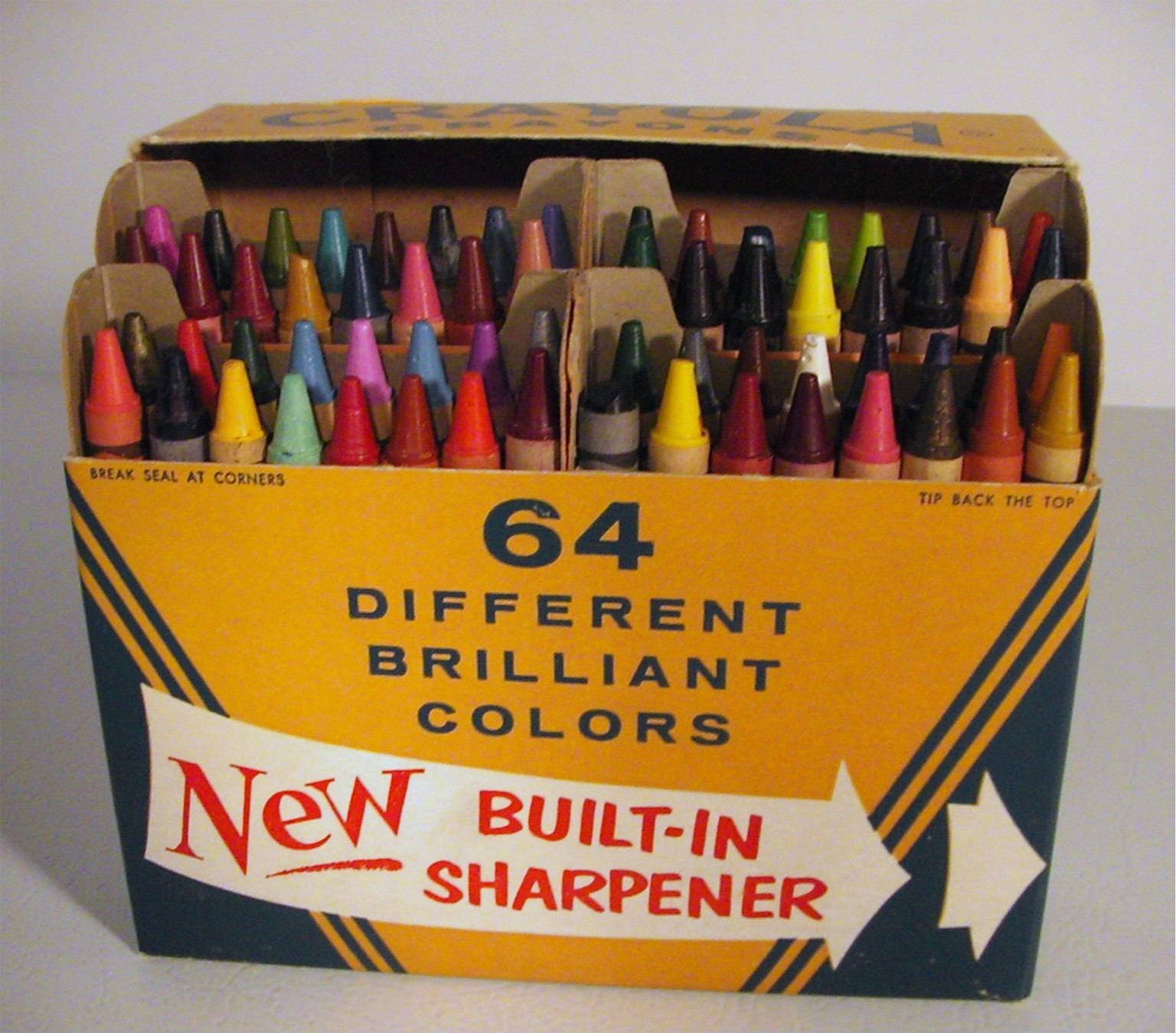
Crayola No. 64, introduced in 1957.

Introduced in 1957, the Crayola No. 64 was Binney & Smith's largest regular assortment for more than thirty years, and featured the last major changes to Crayola colors before 1990. (Note: A seventy-two crayon box was also introduced about this time, but it contained no additional colors, instead including duplicates of the eight most-used crayons. In the 1970's, the duplicates were replaced by Crayola's first specialty crayons, eight fluorescent colors that would fluoresce under black light.) The iconic flip-top box arranged sixty-four crayons in four rows of sixteen, progressively raised to allow for easier access, and a crayon sharpener built into the back of the box.

Although a few of the colors from the No. 48 box were discontinued at this time, most were retained, sometimes with different names, and several new crayons were added to the assortment, including six new "intermediate" hues, as the Crayola color wheel expanded from twelve to eighteen colors.

Color	Name	Hexadecimal	Notes
	Red	#ED0A3F	
	Maroon	#C32148	Same color as "Dark Red" (1949–1957).
	Brick Red	#CB4154	
	Indian Red	#CD5C5C	Same color as "Chestnut" (1999–present).
	Orange-Red	#FF5349	One of eight colors "retired" in 1990.
	Bittersweet	#FE6F5E	
	Burnt Orange	#CC5500	
	Red-Orange	#FF3F34	
	Orange	#FF8833	
	Yellow-Orange	#FFAE42	
	Maize	#F2C649	Same color as "Gold Ochre" (1903–1957). One of eight colors "retired" in 1990.
	Orange-Yellow	#F5BD1F	One of eight colors "retired" in 1990.
	Goldenrod	#DAA520	Same color as "Medium Chrome Yellow" (1903–1910) and "Medium Yellow" (1903–1957).
	Yellow	#FFFF00	
	Green-Yellow	#F1E788	
	Spring Green	#ECEBBD	
	Olive Green	#B5B35C	
	Lemon Yellow	#FFF44F	Same color as "Light Yellow" (1903–1958). One of eight colors "retired" in 1990.
	Yellow-Green	#9ACD32	
	Forest Green	#228B22	Same color as "Dark Green" (1949–1957).
	Sea Green	#2E8B57	Same color as "Light Green" (1949–1957).
	Green	#008001	
	Pine Green	#01796F	Same color as "Dark Chrome Green" (1903–1910) and "Dark Green" (1903–1949).
	Light Blue	#ADD8E6	Discontinued in 1958; replaced by Turquoise Blue.
	Aquamarine	#458B74	Same color as "Light Turquoise Blue" (1949–1957).
	Sky Blue	#76D7EA	
	Blue-Green	#0095B7	Same color as "Middle Blue Green" (1949–1957).
	Cornflower	#93CCEA	
	Green-Blue	#2887C8	One of eight colors "retired" in 1990.
	Navy Blue	#0066CC	
	Midnight Blue	#00468C	Same color as "Prussian Blue" (1903–1957).
	Blue	#0066FF	
	Cadet Blue	#A9B2C3	
	Periwinkle	#C3CDE6	
	Violet-Blue	#766EC8	Same color as Blue-Violet (1930–1958). One of eight colors "retired" in 1990.
	Blue-Violet	#6456B7	Same color as "Violet" (1949–1957).
	Violet	#8359A3	On labels "Violet (Purple)".
	Brilliant Rose	#E667CE	Discontinued in 1958; replaced by Magenta.
	Plum	#843179	
	Orchid	#E29CD2	Same color as "Medium Red-Violet" (1949–1958).
	Thistle	#EBB0D7	Same color as "Light Magenta" (1949–1958). "Retired" in 1999.
	Mulberry	#C8509B	"Retired" in 2003.
	Red-Violet	#BB3385	
	Lavender	#FBAED2	
	Carnation Pink	#FFA6C9	Same color as "Rose Pink" (1903–1957).
	Violet-Red	#F7468A	
	Salmon	#FF91A4	
	Mahogany	#CA3435	
	Melon	#FEBAAD	
	Burnt Sienna	#E97451	
	Brown	#AF593E	
	Sepia	#9E5B40	
	Raw Sienna	#D27D46	
	Tan	#D99A6C (Note: The digital swatch provided by Crayola is 250, 157, 90. Although the correct hue, this color is much more intense than a tan crayon.)	
	Peach	#FFCBA4	Same color as "Flesh Tint" (1903–1949), "Flesh" (1949–1956, 1958–1962), and "Pink Beige" (1956–1957).
	Apricot	#FDD5B1	
	Raw Umber	#826644	One of eight colors "retired" in 1990.
	Gold	#A57C00	Metallic; swatch represents nominal hue only.
	Silver	#AAA9AD	Metallic; swatch represents nominal hue only.
	Copper	#B87333	Metallic; swatch represents nominal hue only.
	Black	#000000	
	Gray	#8B8680	Same color as "Neutral Gray" (1926–1956).
	Blue-Gray	#6699CC	One of eight colors "retired" in 1990.
	White	#FFFFFF	

== Changes 1958–1990 ==
The first changes to the No. 64 box were made in its first year of production, as Light Blue and Brilliant Rose were replaced by Turquoise Blue and Magenta. From then to 1990, no colors were replaced, although, in 1963, Flesh was formally renamed Peach, partially in response to the civil rights movement, the company said. Flesh had been known as Flesh Tint until 1949, and was called Pink Beige from 1956 to 1958. In 1962, the flesh-colored crayon was not featured in the commemorative box because Crayola felt it was insensitive. They recognized that not all skin tones are the same.

The 1970s saw the introduction of Crayola's first specialty crayons, eight fluorescent colors designed to glow under black light. They were: Wild Watermelon (formerly Ultra Red), Outrageous Orange (formerly Ultra Orange), Atomic Tangerine (formerly Ultra Yellow), Laser Lemon (formerly Chartreuse), Screamin' Green (formerly Ultra Green), Blizzard Blue (formerly Ultra Blue), Shocking Pink (formerly Ultra Pink), and Razzle Dazzle Rose (formerly Hot Magenta). These were never added to the No. 64 box, but were available separately or in a special box of 72 crayons, typically packaged with activity books or crayon stands. Fabric crayons were introduced in 1980, as the Crayola brand continued to expand beyond regular drawing crayons. Colored pencils and markers followed.

Color	Name	Hexadecimal	Notes
	Wild Watermelon	#FD5B78	Same color as "Ultra Red" (1972–1990).
	Outrageous Orange	#FF6037	Same color as "Ultra Orange" (1972–1990).
	Atomic Tangerine	#FF9966	Same color as "Ultra Yellow" (1972–1990).
	Laser Lemon	#E6FF66	Same color as "Chartreuse" (1972–1990).
	Screamin' Green	#66FF66	Same color as "Ultra Green" (1972–1990).
	Blizzard Blue	#64CAE0	Same color as "Ultra Blue" (1972–1990). "Retired" in 2003.
	Shocking Pink	#FF6EFF	Same color as "Ultra Pink" (1972–1990).
	Razzle Dazzle Rose	#EE34D2	Same color as "Hot Magenta" (1972–1990).

== 1990 – present ==
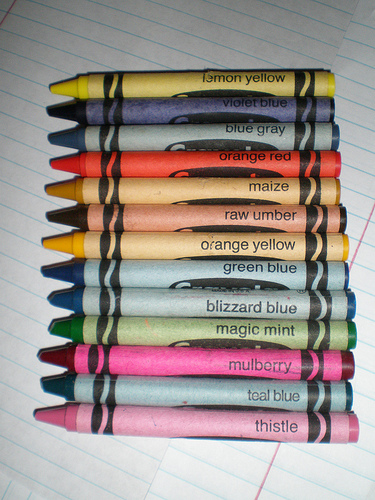
The thirteen colors officially "retired" since 1990: Orange Red, Maize, Orange Yellow, Lemon Yellow, Magic Mint, Teal Blue, Blizzard Blue, Blue Gray, Green Blue, Violet Blue, Mulberry, Thistle, and Raw Umber (excluding Dandelion, which is no longer retired since 2026)

On August 6, 1990, Crayola saw the first major changes to crayons in more than thirty years, as eight colors were "retired into the Crayon Hall of Fame," and eight new colors were introduced, followed by sixteen more in 1993, and twenty-four more in 1998. Five colors were replaced between 1999 and 2003.

The first major change was the replacement of eight colors that had long been part of the Crayola lineup. These were: Orange-Red (first produced in 1958), Maize (formerly Gold Ochre, produced since 1903), Orange-Yellow (1958), Lemon Yellow (formerly Light Yellow, produced since 1903), Green-Blue (1958), Violet-Blue (produced as Blue-Violet from 1930 to 1958), Raw Umber (1903), and Blue-Gray (1958). (Note: The last versions of these crayons produced before they were discontinued spelled the names without hyphens.) With the loss of Orange-Red, Orange-Yellow, Green-Blue, and Violet-Blue, the Crayola color wheel was reduced from eighteen to fourteen colors, with six "principal hues" and eight "intermediate" hues. The eight new colors were: Vivid Tangerine, Dandelion (later retired in 2017), Jungle Green, Teal Blue (later retired in 2003), Cerulean, Royal Purple, Fuchsia, and Wild Strawberry. During that time, 8 other fluorescent colors were also introduced, they were: Radical Red, Neon Carrot, Sunglow, Unmellow Yellow, Electric Lime, Magic Mint (later retired in 2003), Hot Magenta, and Purple Pizzazz.

Late in 1992, Binney & Smith introduced the Crayola No. 96 Big Box, containing the sixty-four existing colors, as well as sixteen fluorescent crayons, and sixteen unnamed colors, the names of which were to be chosen in a nationwide contest. The winners were announced the following year, and included: Macaroni and Cheese, Asparagus, Granny Smith Apple, Shamrock, Tropical Rain Forest, Robin's Egg Blue, Pacific Blue, Denim, Purple Mountains' Majesty, Wisteria, Cerise, Razzmatazz, Tickle Me Pink, Mauvelous, Tumbleweed, and Timberwolf.

In 1996, a special color called Blue Ribbon was produced to celebrate the production of one hundred billion Crayola crayons since 1903. Crayons of this color were included in "limited edition" versions of the No. 96 box produced early that year, but it did not become part of the regular assortment. The following year, four bright colors were introduced: Sunset Orange, Caribbean Green, Vivid Violet, and Pink Flamingo, which were then incorporated into the regular lineup. 1997 also saw a contest called to name eight new colors, incorporated into assortments the following year: Torch Red (later “Scarlet” in 1998), Banana Mania, Mountain Meadow, Outer Space, Purple Heart, Brink Pink (later “Pink Sherbet” in 2005), Fuzzy Wuzzy Brown (later "Fuzzy Wuzzy" in 2005), and Shadow.

1998 saw the introduction of Crayola's first 120-count assortment. In addition to the existing colors, twelve more were added to the lineup in order to bring the count of regular and fluorescent crayons up to 120. These were: Canary, Fern, Manatee, Blue Bell, Eggplant, Cotton Candy, Cranberry (later “Blush” in 2005), Pig Pink, Beaver, Desert Sand, Almond, and Antique Brass, a metallic crayon. The same year, Torch Red became Scarlet.

In 1999, Indian Red, part of the Crayola lineup since 1903, was renamed Chestnut, ostensibly because of confusion that children would assume that the color referred to the skin color of American Indians, rather than a reddish pigment from India. Thistle, originally produced as Light Magenta in 1949, was replaced by Indigo. This made Thistle the only color discontinued after 1990 to not be considered "officially retired".

To celebrate the hundredth anniversary of Crayola Crayons in 2003, a special 100-count box was created, adding four new colors to the existing 96-color box. As in 1992 and 1996, the names were chosen as part of a contest, and the four new crayons became part of the No. 96 box at the end of the anniversary year. The new colors were: Mango Tango, Inchworm, Wild Blue Yonder, and Jazzberry Jam. To make room for them, four other crayons were retired; two of the sixteen fluorescent colors (Magic Mint and Blizzard Blue), plus Mulberry (produced since 1958) and Teal Blue (introduced in 1990). Crayola enthusiasts were given the opportunity to save one of five colors nominated for retirement via an internet poll: the winner was Burnt Sienna. The four crayons were officially retired on October 11, 2003.

Three colors received new names in 2005, as Brink Pink became Pink Sherbert [sic], Cranberry became Blush, and Fuzzy Wuzzy Brown was shortened to Fuzzy Wuzzy. Since these changes, the Crayola lineup has remained steady, with changes confined to specialty crayons.

On March 31, 2017, Crayola announced it would retire Dandelion, to replace it with a blue color. A public vote was held, and on September 14, 2017, the new crayon color's name was announced as "Bluetiful". The crayon color was included in the boxes for sale starting in late January 2018. In 2026, Dandelion was reintroduced.

In 2021, four new colors were introduced: "Crayellow", "Powder Blue", "Cool Mint", and "Oatmeal".

The following table includes all of the standard colors introduced since 1990.

Color	Name	Hexadecimal in their website depiction	Notes
	Radical Red	#FF355E	Introduced in 1990.
	Scarlet	#FD0E35	Introduced in 1998. Same color as "Torch Red" (1998).
	Mango Tango	#FF3B29	Introduced in 2003.
	Sunset Orange	#FE4C40	Introduced in 1997.
	Vivid Tangerine	#FF9980	Introduced in 1990.
	Macaroni and Cheese	#FFB97B	Introduced in 1993. Also found as "Macaroni & Cheese" and "Macaroni-n-Cheese".
	Neon Carrot	#FF9933	Introduced in 1990.
	Sunglow	#FFCC33	Introduced in 1990.
	Banana Mania	#FBE7B2	Introduced in 1998.
	Dandelion	#FED85D	Produced 1990-2017. Reintroduced in 2026.
	Crayellow	#F1D651	Introduced in 2021.
	Unmellow Yellow	#FFEE66	Introduced in 1990.
	Canary	#FFFF99	Introduced in 1998.
	Inchworm	#DEE327	Introduced in 2003.
	Electric Lime	#CCFF00	Introduced in 1990.
	Asparagus	#7BA05B	Introduced in 1993.
	Granny Smith Apple	#9DE093	Introduced in 1993.
	Fern	#63B76C	Introduced in 1998.
	Magic Mint	#83CAA2	Produced 1990–2003.
	Shamrock	#33CC99	Introduced in 1993.
	Mountain Meadow	#1AB385	Introduced in 1998.
	Jungle Green	#29AB87	Introduced in 1990.
	Caribbean Green	#00CC99	Introduced in 1997.
	Tropical Rain Forest	#00755E	Introduced in 1993.
	Cool Mint	#DDEBEC	Introduced in 2021.
	Robin's Egg Blue	#00CCCC	Introduced in 1993.
	Teal Blue	#008080	Produced 1990–2003.
	Outer Space	#2D383A	Introduced in 1998.
	Pacific Blue	#1CA9C9	Introduced in 1993.
	Cerulean	#02A4D3	Introduced in 1990.
	Denim	#1560BD	Introduced in 1993.
	Powder Blue	#C0D5F0	Introduced in 2021.
	Bluetiful	#3C69E7	Introduced in 2017.
	Wild Blue Yonder	#A2ADD0	Introduced in 2003.
	Indigo	#4F69C6	Introduced in 1999.
	Manatee	#979AAA	Introduced in 1998.
	Blue Bell	#A2A2D0	Introduced in 1998.
	Purple Heart	#69359C	Introduced in 1998.
	Royal Purple	#7851A9	Introduced in 1990.
	Wisteria	#C9A0DC	Introduced in 1993.
	Vivid Violet	#9F00FF	Introduced in 1997.
	Purple Mountains' Majesty	#9678B6	Introduced in 1993. Also found as "Purple Mountain Majesty" and "Purple Mountain's Majesty."
	Fuchsia	#C154C1	Introduced in 1990.
	Pink Flamingo	#FC74FD	Introduced in 1997.
	Hot Magenta	#FF00CC	Introduced in 1990.
	Purple Pizzazz	#FF00BB	Introduced in 1990.
	Jazzberry Jam	#A50B5E	Introduced in 2003.
	Eggplant	#614051	Introduced in 1998.
	Cerise	#DA3287	Introduced in 1993.
	Wild Strawberry	#FF43A4	Introduced in 1990.
	Cotton Candy	#FFBCD9	Introduced in 1998.
	Razzmatazz	#E3256B	Introduced in 1993.
	Pig Pink	#FDDDE6	Introduced in 1998. Also called "Piggy Pink."
	Blush	#DE5D83	Same color as "Cranberry" (1998–2005).
	Tickle Me Pink	#FC89AC	Introduced in 1993.
	Mauvelous	#EF98AA	Introduced in 1993.
	Pink Sherbert	#F78FA7	Same color as "Brink Pink" (1998–2005).
	Fuzzy Wuzzy	#CC6666	Same color as "Fuzzy Wuzzy Brown" (1998–2005).
	Beaver	#9F8170	Introduced in 1998.
	Tumbleweed	#DEAA88	Introduced in 1993.
	Desert Sand	#EDC9AF	Introduced in 1998.
	Almond	#EFDECD	Introduced in 1998.
	Shadow	#8A795D	Introduced in 1998.
	Antique Brass	#CD9575	Introduced in 1998. Metallic; swatch represents nominal hue only.
	Timberwolf	#D9D6CF	Introduced in 1993.
	Oatmeal	#D9DAD2	Introduced in 2021.

== The Crayola color wheel ==
=== 1926: 10 colors ===
The concept of the color wheel first became associated with Crayola crayons with Binney & Smith's acquisition of the Munsell line in 1926. Munsell's color system was based on five "principal hues" and five "intermediate hues," resulting in a color wheel of ten colors. The principal hues were red, yellow, green, blue, and purple; the intermediate hues were yellow red, green yellow, blue green, blue purple, and red purple. Each was available with either maximum chroma or with middle value and middle chroma. The following table depicts all of the principal and intermediate hues at maximum chroma.

Color	Name
	Maximum Red
	Maximum Yellow Red
	Maximum Yellow
	Maximum Green Yellow
	Maximum Green
	Maximum Blue Green
	Maximum Blue
	Maximum Blue Purple
	Maximum Purple
	Maximum Red Purple

=== 1930: 12 colors ===
In 1930, Binney & Smith adopted the concept of the color wheel into its own line, including orange as a principal hue, and basing the other hues on its existing colors rather than the Munsell version. This resulted in a twelve-color wheel that fit neatly into the regular Crayola lineup.

Color	Name
	Red
	Red-Orange / Vermillion
	Orange
	Yellow-Orange / Marigold
	Yellow
	Yellow-Green / Chartreuse
	Green
	Blue-Green / Aquamarine
	Blue
	Blue-Violet / Indigo
	Violet
	Red-Violet / Magenta

=== Adjustments in 1935 and 1949 ===
The only significant changes to the Crayola color wheel between 1930 and 1958 occurred in 1935, when the original blue was replaced with a darker hue, and 1949, when a new version of violet was introduced:

Color	Name
	Blue (1903)
	Blue (1935)
	Violet (1930)
	Violet (1949)

=== 1958: 18 colors ===
In 1958, Binney & Smith introduced the No. 64 box, with numerous changes to the existing palette, and a major revision of the color wheel, which expanded from twelve to eighteen colors. The six intermediate hues were doubled, so that there were now two intermediate hues between each of the principal hues. The 1935 blue was replaced with a more intense color, and a new, darker blue-green was substituted for the previous version; the 1930 version of violet returned, while the 1949 violet became blue-violet, and the original blue-violet became violet-blue. The 1958 color wheel remained a fixture of Crayola crayons until 1990, when four of the colors were discontinued: orange-red, orange-yellow, green-blue, and violet-blue. Without these colors, the Crayola color wheel includes fourteen colors; there are two hues between yellow and green, and two between violet and red, but only one between the other principal hues.

Color	Name
	Red
	Orange-Red
	Red-Orange
	Orange
	Yellow-Orange
	Orange-Yellow
	Yellow
	Green-Yellow
	Yellow-Green
	Green
	Blue-Green
	Green-Blue
	Blue
	Violet-Blue
	Blue-Violet
	Violet
	Red-Violet
	Violet-Red

== See also ==
- List of Crayola crayon colors
- Timeline of Crayola
- List of colors
