= Helen Binney Kitchel =

American politician and writer (1890–1990)

Member of the Connecticut House of Representatives from Greenwich
- In office 1931–1939
- Preceded by: W. Stanley Finney; Georgina B. Davids
- Succeeded by: L. Paul Burke; Milo A. Mitchell

Personal details
- Born: September 9, 1890 Old Greenwich, Connecticut, U.S.
- Died: February 11, 1990 (aged 99)
- Party: Republican
- Spouse: Allan Farrand Kitchel (m. 1909)
- Parent(s): Edwin Binney; Alice Stead Binney
- Relatives: Dorothy Binney Palmer (sister)

Helen Binney Kitchel (September 9, 1890 – February 11, 1990) was an American politician. She is best known for her fight against billboards. She was elected in the Connecticut House of Representatives from 1931 to 1939. She was the first woman in Connecticut to have a bill named after her.

Kitchel was born on September 9, 1890, in Old Greenwich to parents Edwin Binney and Alice Stead Binney. She attended the Catherine Aiken School in Stamford. She married Allan Farrand Kitchel in 1909.

Helen Binney Kitchel Natural Park was named after her, as is a holly grove at Greenwich Point beach. In 1961, Kitchel gave the state of Connecticut a tract of land that forms what is now called Algonquin State Forest.
