= Colin Snedeker =

British-born American chemist (1936–2016)

- Born: January 5, 1936; Newcastle upon Tyne, England, United Kingdom
- Died: October 22, 2016 (aged 80); Wichita, Kansas, United States
- Occupation: Chemist

Colin M. Snedeker (January 5, 1936 – October 22, 2016) was a British-born American chemist best known as the inventor of the first washable crayons. Snedeker developed the washable crayon while working as a chemist for Binney & Smith, which was the parent company of Crayola crayons at the time, in response to complaints from parents and consumers. He won the patent for the washable solid marking composition utilized in the crayons in 1990. He also developed products for Kiwi shoe polish and DuPont.

== Biography ==
Snedeker was born in Newcastle upon Tyne in North East England on January 5, 1936. His grandfather had been killed in a fire before he was born and an English couple had adopted Snedeker's father when he was 13-years old. Colin Snedeker and his sister, Ann, were raised in England. They discovered letters from their father's birth family, who lived in Pennsylvania, in 1948, and soon were invited to visit them in the United States.

Colin Snedeker entered high school at age 13 and graduated when he was just 15 years old. He studied metallurgy after high school.

Snedeker was hired by Kiwi shoe polish for one of his earliest jobs. There he developed a new, white shoe polish that did not stain clothing.

He later moved to Pennsylvania, where he was employed as a chemist by Binney & Smith, the then-parent company of Crayola crayons. While working Binney & Smith, Snedeker ran out of ideas as to which projects to pursue. He visited the Crayola complaint department to gain an insight into consumer problems with their products. According to his sister, "One of the women [in the mail room] said they received the most mail from mothers wanting to know how to wash out crayons from fabrics, car seats and walls. He got to thinking, and that’s when he came up with washable crayons."

Snedeker successfully developed the first washable crayon available on the market for Crayola. He was awarded the patent for the washable solid marking composition used in his washable crayons in 1990. During the later 1990s, Snedecker also won patents for fluorescent and phosphorescent marking compositions utilized in new lines of Crayolas, as well as a color-changing marking composition system for Crayola.

In 2004, Snedeker, who was divorced and had no children, relocated from Pennsylvania to Wichita, Kansas, to be closer to his relatives.

Colin Snedeker died in Wichita, Kansas, on October 22, 2016, at the age of 80. He was survived by his sister, Ann Strickland.
