= Immokolee =

Historic house in Florida, United States

- U.S. National Register of Historic Places
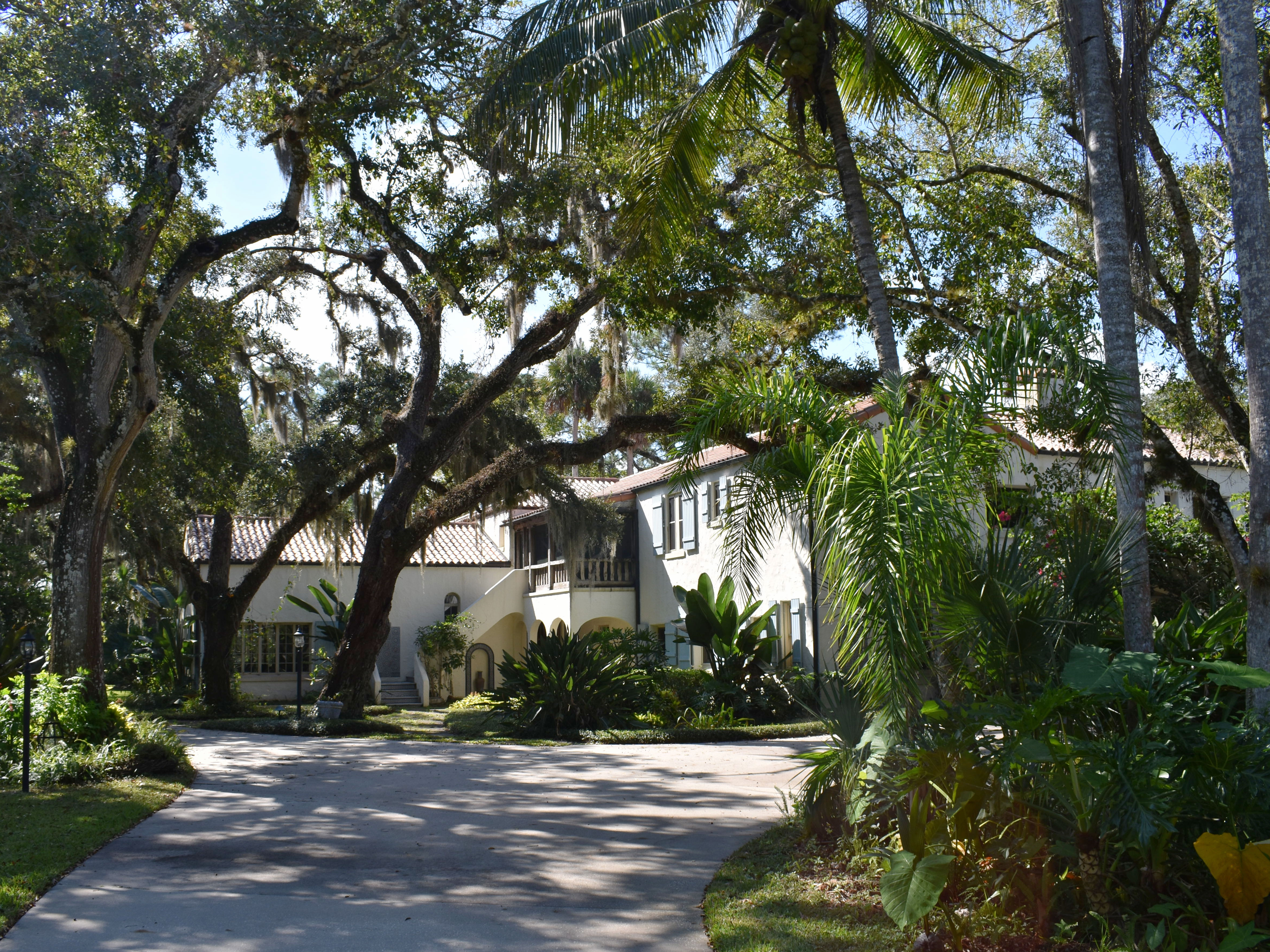
- Immokolee in 2018

- Location within Florida Location within the United States
- Location: 8431 Immokolee Rd., Fort Pierce, Florida
- Coordinates: 27°29′00″N 80°24′40″W
- Area: less than one acre
- Built: 1931
- Built by: Tyler, Franklind
- Architectural style: Mission/spanish Revival
- NRHP reference No.: 93001450
- Added to NRHP: July 29, 1994

Immokolee (also known as the Dorothy Binney Palmer House) is a historic home in Fort Pierce, Florida. It is located at 8431 Immokolee Road. On July 29, 1994, it was added to the U.S. National Register of Historic Places.

The name "Immokolee" derives from a Seminole dialect word meaning "our home" or "my home place."

The Mission Revival house was constructed in 1931 by local builder Franklind Tyler from a design provided by owner Dorothy Binney Palmer. The house was restored after Palmer's death in 1985.
