= Algonquin State Forest =

Forest in Connecticut, United States

- Location within Connecticut Location within the United States
- Interactive map of Algonquin State Forest
- Location: Colebrook and Winchester, Connecticut, United States
- Coordinates: 41°59′26″N 73°03′20″W
- Area: 2,545 acres (1,030 ha)
- Elevation: 1,585 ft (483 m)
- Established: 1937
- Administrator: Connecticut Department of Energy and Environmental Protection
- Website: Algonquin State Forest

Algonquin State Forest is a Connecticut state forest located in the towns of Colebrook and Winchester. The forest is managed for sawtimber, firewood, wildlife habitat and passive recreational activities. It offers opportunities for hiking, wildlife viewing, and letterboxing. The forest contains two areas of special ecological importance: Sandy Brook Natural Area Preserve and Kitchel Wilderness Natural Area Preserve, the later donated by Helen Binney Kitchel in 1961, both protected as Forever Wild by state statute.
