= George Palmer and Dorothy Binney Putnam House =

Historic house in Oregon, United States

- U.S. National Register of Historic Places
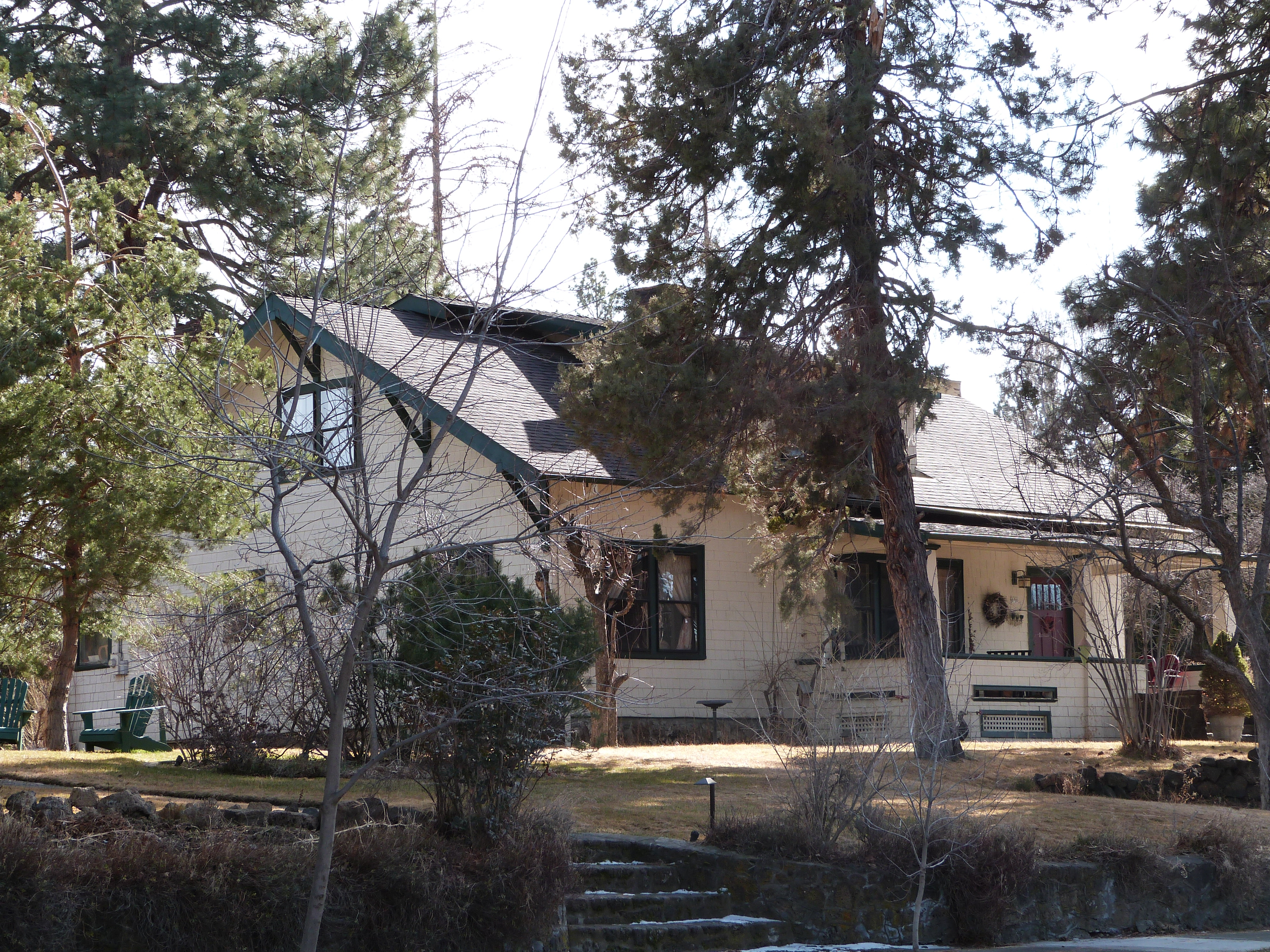

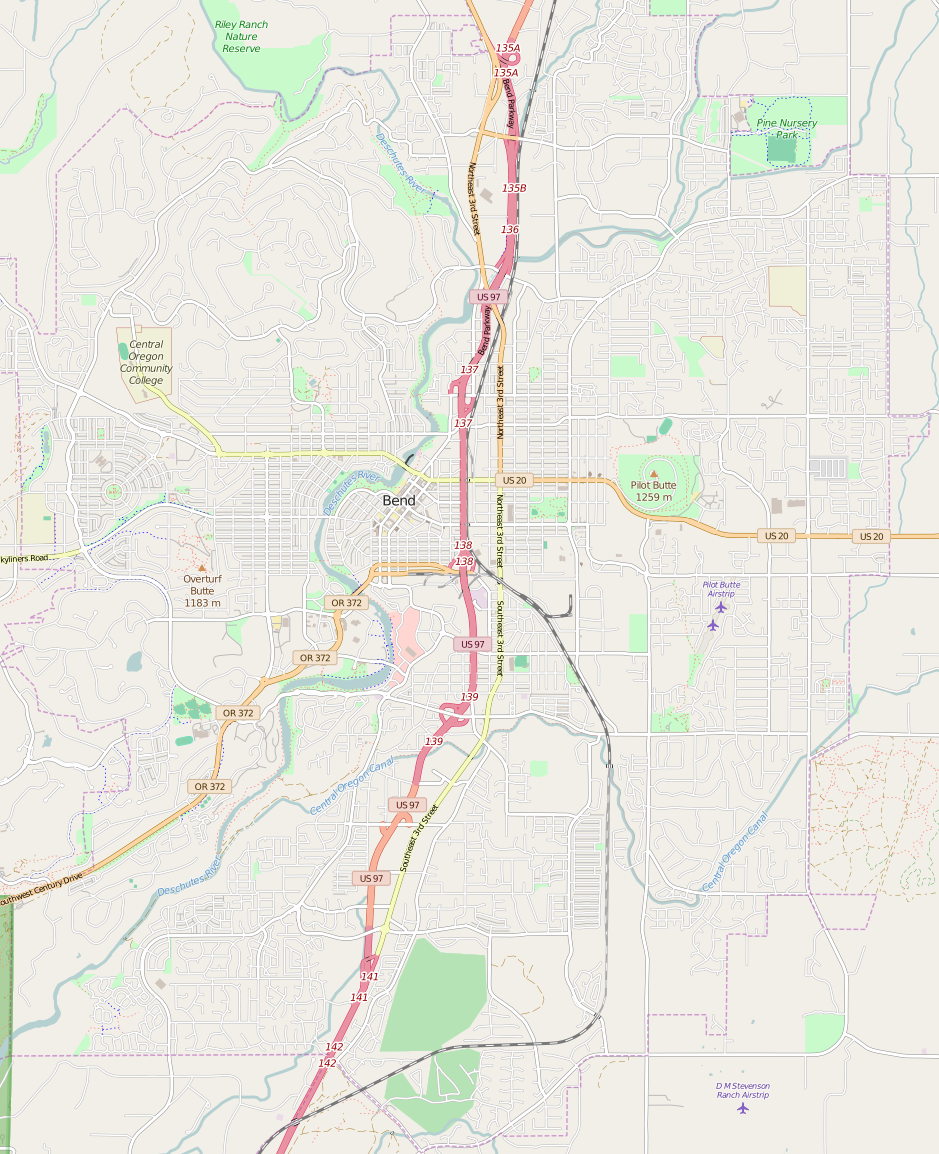
- Location within Bend OR Location within Oregon
- Location: 606 NW Congress Street, Bend, Oregon
- Coordinates: 44°3′28″N 121°19′3″W
- Area: 0.29 acres (0.12 ha)
- Built: 1911
- Architectural style: Bungalow/Craftsman
- NRHP reference No.: 98000607
- Added to NRHP: May 29, 1998

The George Palmer and Dorothy Binney Putnam House is a historic house located in Bend, Oregon.

== Description and history ==
The house is a 1 1/2-story, single-family residence in the American Craftsman style. The home was purchased by newspaper publisher George P. Putnam and his new bride, Dorothy Binney Putnam, the heiress to the Crayola fortune, following their honeymoon in 1912. They named the estate "Pinelyn." At the time it was the third most expensive home constructed in Bend, Oregon in 1911–1912, at a cost of $4,000. The Putnams lived in the house until 1914, and sold it in 1919. The Putnams were divorced in 1929 and Mr. Putnam married famed aviator Amelia Earhart.

Retaining its original character and charm, a majority of the historic fabric in the house is intact. It was listed on the National Register of Historic Places on May 29, 1998.

== See also ==
- National Register of Historic Places listings in Deschutes County, Oregon
