= Dorothy Binney Palmer =

American socialite and world traveler

- Born: Dorothy Binney; July 20, 1888
- Died: May 9, 1982 (aged 93)
- Other names: Dorothy Binney Putnam; Dorothy Binney Upton; Dorothy Binney Blanding
- Education: Wellesley College
- Spouses: George P. Putnam (m. 1911; div. 1929) Frank Monroe Upton (m. 1930, divorced) Don Blanding (m. 1940; div. 1947) Lewis Hamilton Palmer (m. 1947; died 1951)
- Children: 2

Dorothy Binney Palmer (née Binney; July 20, 1888 – May 9, 1982) was an American explorer, socialite, and friend to Amelia Earhart.

== Early life ==
Palmer, born Dorothy Binney on July 20, 1888, was the daughter of Edwin Binney, the manufacturer known for Binney & Smith company which produced Crayola crayons. Growing up she was known as Dorfry to her friends and family, and she was a championship swimmer. Palmer went to Wellesley College where she participated in plays such as "The Tempest", "Trail of Lonesome Pine", and "Princess Far Away", and she was praised for her acting and dramatic ability. Palmer was also an athlete who rowed crew. She graduated from Wellesley College in 1910. Later that year Dorothy and her sister Mary Binney were written up in the paper for besting two men while setting a swimming record in Stamford, Connecticut.

After her sophomore year in college, she met George P. Putnam in 1908 who was leading a climbing trip up Mount Whitney with the Sierra Mountain Club; after the hiking trip they had an "understanding" about their plan to marry. They announced their engagement in 1910, and she married Putnam and became Dorothy Binney Putnam on October 26, 1911, in a wedding held at her parents' house in Sound Beach, Connecticut.

== Life with George Putnam ==
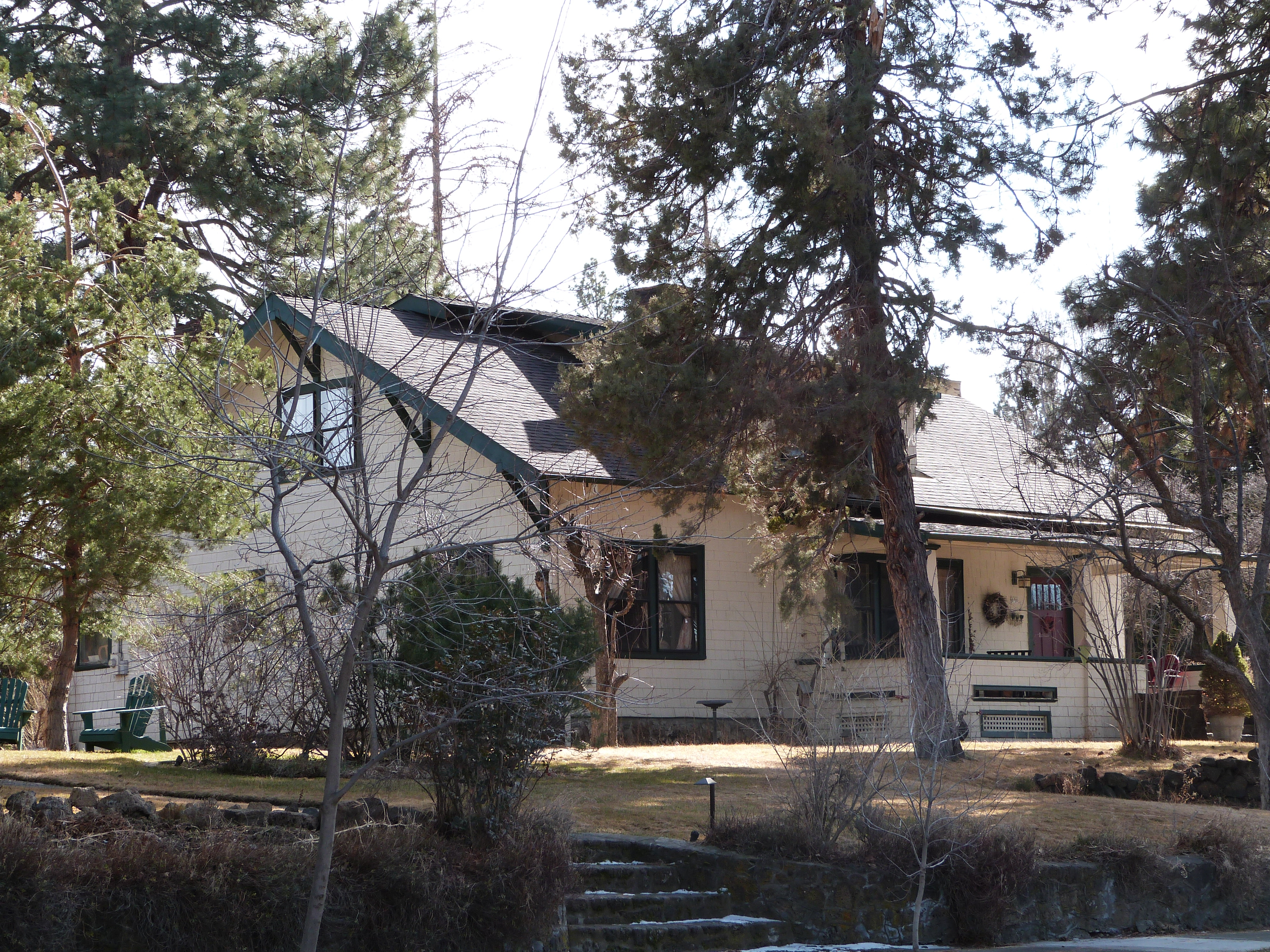
In 1911, Dorothy Binney Putnam and George Putnam had a house built in Bend, Oregon. The house, known as Pinelyn, was added to the United States' National Register of Historic Places in 1998.

Dorothy and George arrived in Bend, Oregon in February 1912 a honeymoon that had taken them to New York, Central America, San Francisco, and Portland. Their new house, Pinelyn, was 2800 square feet, cost more than $4000 to build, and by 1913 had an added tennis court. The house, now known as the George Palmer and Dorothy Binney Putnam House, is located in the Drake Park Neighborhood Historic District and was added to the National Register of Historic Places in 1998. While they lived in Bend, George Putnam sold lots on the Bend riverfront and named the resulting road Dohema Road after the three Binney sisters: Dorothy, Helen, Mary.

Dorothy established the home as a social gathering place in Bend, and threw parties with music, dancing, and skits; she founded the local Glee club and raised funds for people undergoing cancer care. She was known for her work in the suffrage movement and encouraging other women to help pass the laws needed to allow women the right to vote.

On December 3, 1912, she cast her vote in Oregon, the second woman allowed to do so after the Governor's wife had cast the first vote. She gave birth to her first child, David Binney Putnam, on May 20, 1913. They remained in Bend until 1914 when they moved to Salem, Oregon while her husband George was secretary to James Withycombe. In 1916, they moved to Washington D.C. where Dorothy was involved in the war effort.

She had been trained at Mount Holyoke College in a class related to work needs during wartime, and ended up leading nine hundred people in the United States' Inspection Division at the end of World War I. Dorothy and George then moved to Rye, New York, where they built a house without blueprints which included a jungle-themed guest room painted by the artist Isabel Cooper. Her second child, George Palmer Putnam, was born May 9, 1921.

They sold the Oregon house to M. W. Wagner in 1919, the same year that George Putnam published his book The Smiting of the Rock which is about Oregon and has a character based on Dorothy.

== Voyages: Arcturus expedition and sailing on the Effie M. Morrissey ==
In 1925, Dorothy Putnam and her twelve-year-old son David Putnam joined one leg of the Arcturus expedition that was being led by William Beebe. She was one of six women and twelve men on the voyage to the Galápagos Islands. Her name later appeared in the book 'Florida women of distinction' for outstanding achievements because of her participation in this journey. She was described as a "fun-loving woman" who organized activities such as games and charades with the group on the boat. During the expedition, she helped with the identification of fish, and made sure she knew all about venomous and non-venomous snakes so that she could differentiate between them.

Her husband was William Beebe's publicist and was helping to promote the trip. Her son David wrote a book about the trip with Beebe and the book, David Goes Voyaging, was the first in the series published by George Putnam in which boys wrote about their adventures. In the book, David describes playing like a pirate during the voyage, going to different islands, crossing the equator, and investigating animals. George Putnam had sent Beebe a letter indicating he wanted David to do a book because there was benefit in publishing such a book, and Beebe later warned Dorothy that David might want to become a scientist when he grew up.

In 1926, George Putnam took their son David on an expedition on the Effie M. Morrissey that was led by Robert Bartlett and headed to the east coast of Greenland. Dorothy was able to sail as far as Brigus, Newfoundland, and there are photos of her, George, and David in the archives of the Hagley Museum and Library. David also wrote a book about this trip, David Goes to Greenland, and dedicated the book "To my best friend who really should have gone to Greenland, mother".

== Friendship with Amelia Earhart ==
Through George Putnam, Dorothy met and befriended Amelia Earhart, and Dorothy and Earhart flew together in Earhart's Avro Avian plane. In May 1928 Dorothy and Earhart spent six days together in Boston in preparation for Earhart's transatlantic flight. Dorothy was one of the people financially supporting Earhart's transatlantic flight, and Earhart stayed at a hotel using the name Dorothy Binney as a ruse to remain anonymous before the transatlantic flight. In June 1928 Earhart became the first woman to fly, as a passenger, across the Atlantic. After Earhart returned to the United States she stayed with Dorothy and George in their house while writing her book, 20 Hrs. 40 Min. The book was dedicated to "Dorothy Binney Putnam, under whose rooftree this book was written".

Dorothy was also interested in aviation and in July 1929, Dorothy Putnam, Amelia Earhart, Dan Schaeffer, Betty Brainerd, Anne Lindbergh, and Charles Lindbergh were the first people to fly across the United States as passengers in a plane. Dorothy Putnam joined the group at the invitation of Earhart.

== 1920s and 1930s ==
Dorothy had a long-time affair with George Weymouth. They first met in 1927 and Dorothy's diaries describe her feelings for him and their relationship over time. Weymouth would become a tutor to her son David, and traveled with David and George Putnam to Baffin Island in 1927. The 1997 publication of Whistled Like a Bird shares the letters which detail Dorothy's thoughts on the relationship over the years.

In 1929 Dorothy moved out of the house she shared with George Putnam in Rye, New York in the middle of a party that he was hosting, and left for Reno to establish residence, and then filed for divorce under a 'failure to provide'. The newspapers noted that she made no request for alimony given her own status as wealthy. They were divorced by later in 1929 and there was a joint custody arrangement for the two children. A 1929 article in the Daily News noted that it was not clear if George Putnam's travels on the Morrissey played a role in their divorce.

On January 12, 1930, she married a decorated World War I veteran, Frank Monroe Upton, in the West Indies and became Dorothy Binney Upton. By November 1930, George Putnam and Amelia Earhart had a marriage license, though Earhart denied the wedding took place; in February 1931 Earhart and George Putnam were married. By then, Dorothy Binney Upton and her husband Frank Monroe Upton had moved to Fort Pierce, Florida.

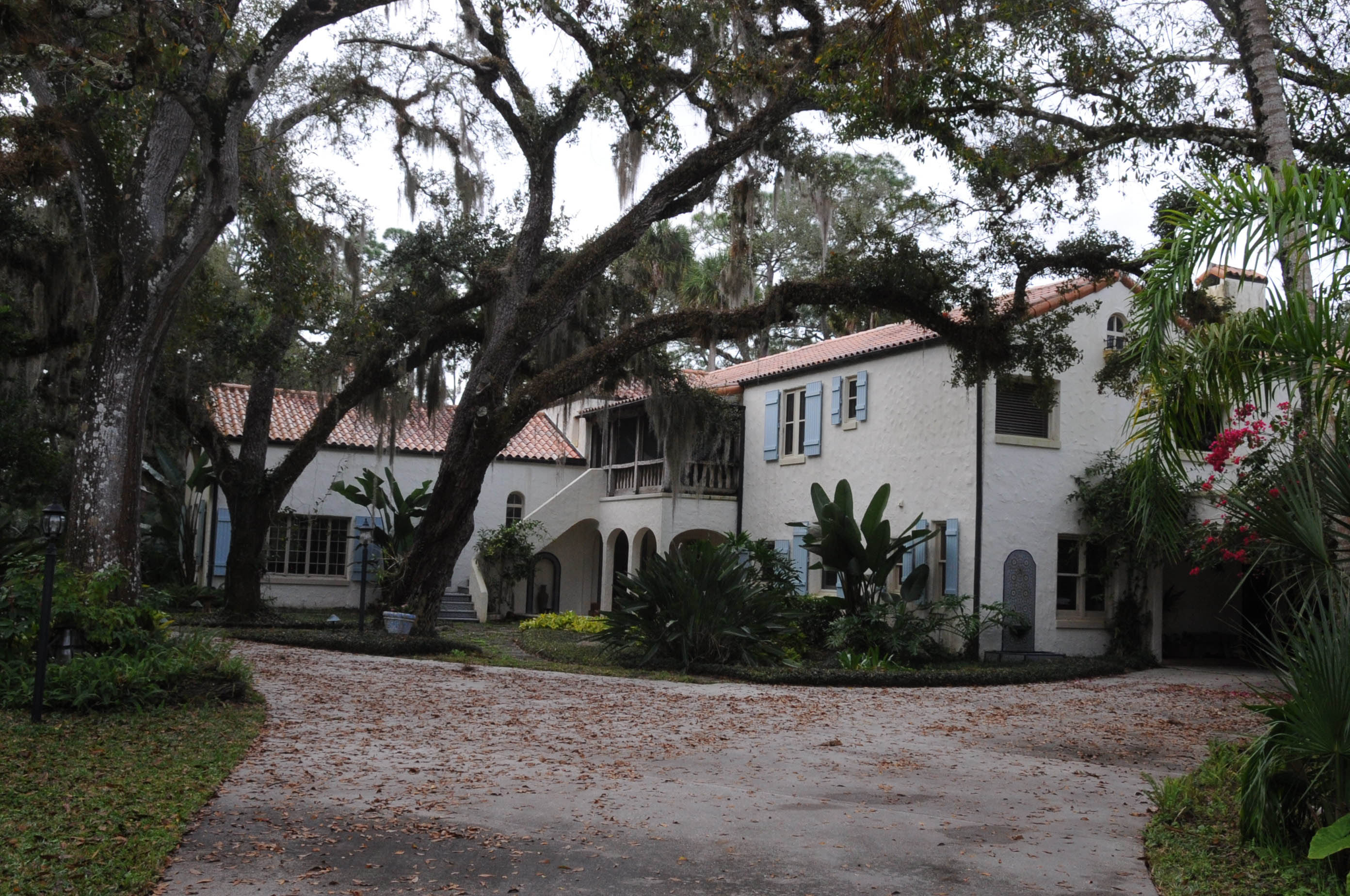
In 1931 Dorothy had Immokolee built in Fort Pierce, Florida. In 1994, the house was listed on the United States' National Register of Historic Places.

In Florida, Dorothy and Upton first lived in an apartment at Casa Caprona, an apartment complex that had been purchased by her mother Alice Binney in 1928. Dorothy subsequently built a house in Fort Pierce, Florida that would come to be known as Immokolee which is listed on the United States' National Register of Historic Places. Immokolee had a large pool which Dorothy would open up for meals and swimming to Navy men during World War II. During a financial crisis in Fort Pierce, she put up Immokolee as collateral as reserve against money needed by a local bank.

In her diaries Dorothy discussed Upton's drinking and poor behavior towards her which ultimately led to their divorce.

Starting in the late 1930s, Dorothy began spending time in North Carolina in the region of the Blue Ridge Mountains called Soco Gap. Her sister Mary Binney had married Jim Davey in 1916, and while her sister died in 1937, Dorothy remained friends with her brother-in-law. She bought property from him and he built a cabin that was first called "Sundown Cabin". Sundown Cabin was known for its views from the porch. Dorothy brought both Don Blanding and Lewis Palmer to the cabin. When the Blue Ridge Parkway was planned, she and others in the area had to pass their land to the state of North Carolina. Dorothy and the Davey's sued; the lawsuits were settled in May 1951. In 1951, R.Getty Browning, the engineer who led the work laying out the design for the parkway, asked for use of Palmer's cabin and a special use permit was granted and the cabin would come to be known as the "Browning Cabin". Historic photos of the cabin are available, but by 2020 the cabin was in the news because of its deterioration.

== Marriage to Don Blanding ==
She was first introduced to the artist and poet Don Blanding in 1912 while she was still married to George Putnam. Blanding visited Rye, New York and invited Dorothy and George to Hawaii, a trip Dorothy took in 1928. In 1940, Blanding visited Dorothy in Florida which led to their June 14, 1940 wedding at Immokolee, she was then known as Dorothy Binney Blanding. Blanding's Floridays poem is dedicated to Dorothy. After the attack on Pearl Harbor he went to war, and did not return to Florida. Their divorce was finalized in 1947.

== Marriage to Lewis Hamilton Palmer ==
During a 1946 trip to Central America, she met Lewis Hamilton Palmer in Guatemala.They were married in July 1947, she was known as Dorothy Binney Palmer for the remainder of her life. They took a trip to Africa which she later wrote about in African Overtones, a collection of newspaper articles about the trip. In 1951 he died of a heart attack while they were in New York.

== Final days in Fort Pierce, Florida ==
Dorothy was a world traveler, and Immokolee accumulated items from her travels. The artists Theodore Wassmer and Judy Wassmer were among the people who visited and brought their art to Immokolee. Palmer was also a writer who wrote stories about her travels and she was a member Association of American Penwomen. Her interest in swimming continued past her childhood, and a pool in Fort Pierce is named the Dorothy Binney Palmer pool which she funded because she felt all children should learn to swim after hearing about a child who drowned.

While in Florida, she helped organize the Fort Pierce Garden Club in St. Lucie in 1931, and served as its president for 24 years. She led beautification projects in Fort Pierce which were detailed in a 1983 newspaper article. She also managed an 80-acre orange grove, and hosted bird counts at her house while serving as the head of the local Audubon Society. In 1975, the Audubon Society made Palmer an honoree during their 75th anniversary.

Palmer died sitting with her son David when she was 93 years old. Upon her death, the local newspaper printed two articles sharing details of her life. In 1997 her granddaughter, Sally Putnam Chapman, published a book based on Palmer's diaries. which was reviewed by The New York Times.
