= Frank Monroe Upton =

US Navy ensign and World War I Medal of Honor recipient

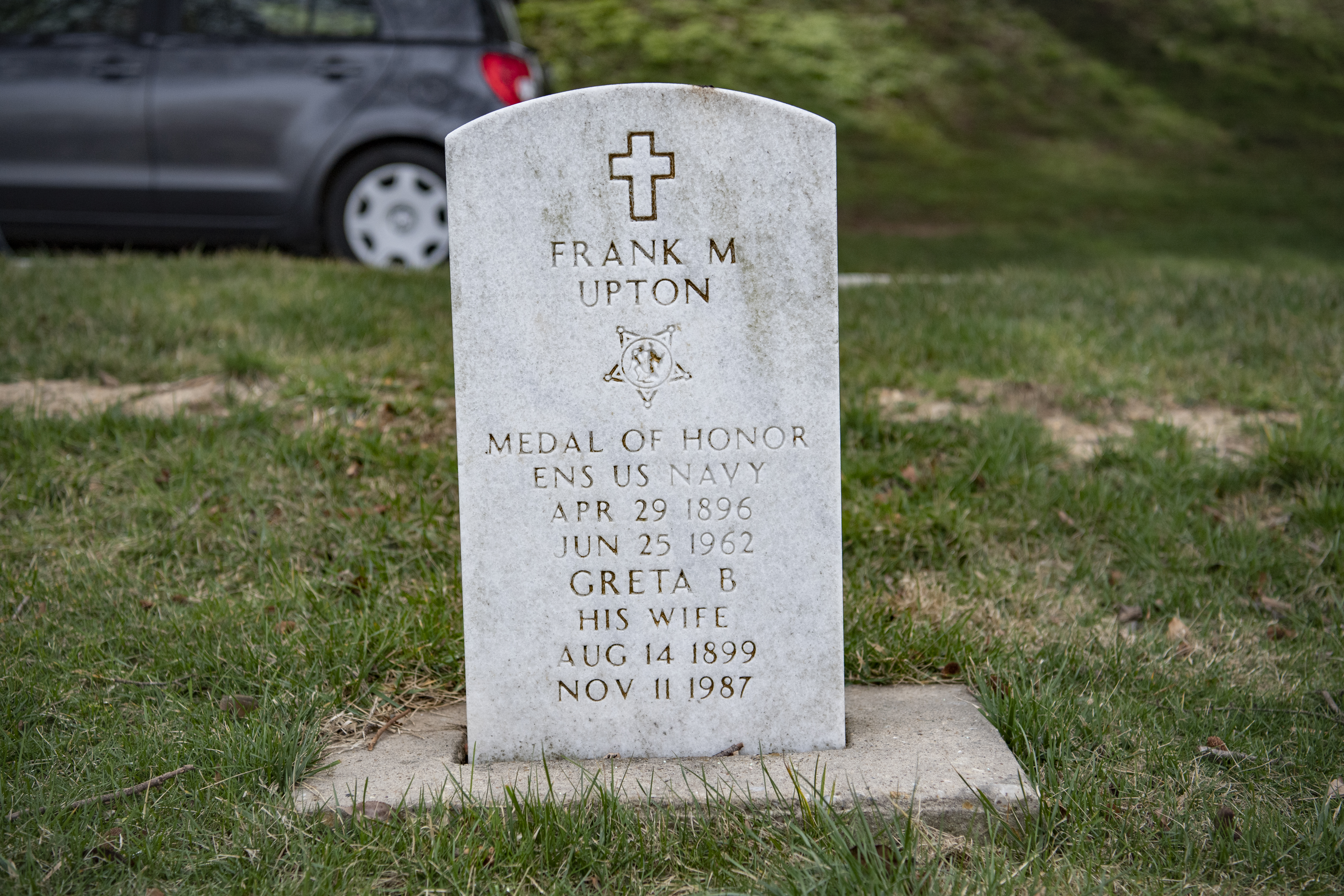
- Grave at Arlington National Cemetery
- Born: April 29, 1896; Loveland, Colorado, US
- Died: June 25, 1962 (aged 66)
- Burial place: Arlington National Cemetery Arlington, Virginia
- Military career
- Allegiance: United States
- Branch: United States Navy
- Rank: Ensign
- Unit: USS Stewart
- Conflicts: World War I
- Awards: Medal of Honor

Frank Monroe Upton (29 April 1896 – 25 June 1962) was a sailor in the United States Navy who received the Medal of Honor for his actions during the First World War.

== Biography ==
Upton was born in Loveland, Colorado on 29 April 1896 and died 25 June 1962. In 1930 Upton married Dorothy Binney Putnam, they later divorced.

He is buried at Arlington National Cemetery in Virginia (Section 8, lot 55-A). His wife, Greta Bohmannson-Upton was buried next him, as was a relative, Paul Upton Fisher.

== Medal of Honor citation ==
Rank and organization: Quartermaster, U.S. Navy. Born: 29 April 1896, Loveland, Colo. Accredited to: Colorado. G.O. No.: 403, 1918.

Citation:

For extraordinary heroism following internal explosion of the Florence H, on 17 April 1918. The sea in the vicinity of wreckage was covered by a mass of boxes of smokeless powder, which were repeatedly exploding. Frank M. Upton, of the U.S.S. Stewart, plunged overboard to rescue a survivor who was surrounded by powder boxes and too exhausted to help himself. Fully realizing the danger from continual explosion of similar powder boxes in the vicinity, he risked his life to save the life of this man.

== See also ==
- List of Medal of Honor recipients for World War I
