= Color Wonder =

Art product range by Crayola

Color Wonder is a product made by Crayola, primarily intended for use by younger children, in which the special clear-ink marker only appears on the Color Wonder paper. Originally made with markers and paper, Color Wonder has also made specialty products. The Color Wonder products debuted in 1993. Color Wonder paints and finger paints, as well as Color Wonder coloring books of popular characters such as Disney Pixar's Cars and Disney Princess also exist.

The 'magic' clear-ink products were designed so that toddlers and young children don't stain their clothes, paint on the walls, etc. Crayola has a patent under Binney & Smith relating to this kind of mess-free marking system. An applicator, such as a felt pen, uses a composition containing a colorless leuco dye that changes to color in the presence of acid. The substrate in the Color Wonder paper contains zinc ions which trigger the development of color in the dyes when the marker inks are applied. The zinc ions act as Lewis acids to drive the color-changing chemical reaction.

Crayola has also another line similar to this one marketed towards older children, called Color Explosion. It is like Color Wonder, except that instead of chemicals on paper revealing the hidden color of the marker ink, the chemicals in the marker reveal stripes, dots, and swirls of color on the page. Depending on the package you get (Fire & Ice, Twisted Tropicals, etc.) the colors hidden in the paper are different. Color Explosion is also available in black and white paper.
