= Crayon =

Stick of pigmented wax for writing or drawing

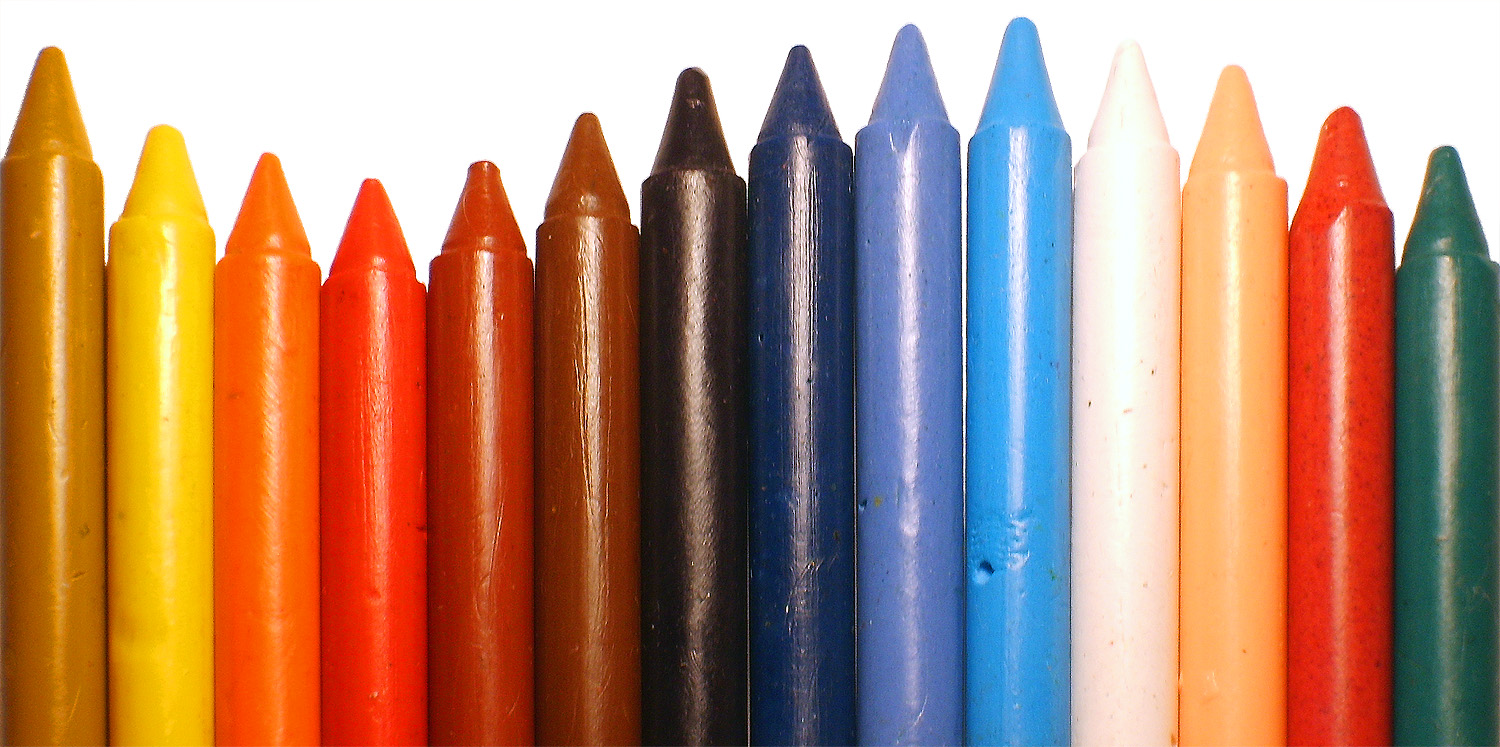
A colorful selection of crayons

A crayon (or wax pastel) is a stick of pigmented wax used for writing or drawing. Wax crayons differ from pastels, in which the pigment is mixed with a dry binder such as gum arabic, and from oil pastels, where the binder is a mixture of wax and oil.

Crayons are available in a range of prices, and are easy to work with. They are less messy than most paints and markers, blunt (removing the risk of sharp points present when using a pencil or pen), typically non-toxic, and available in a wide variety of colors. These characteristics make them particularly good instruments for teaching small children to draw in addition to being used widely by student and professional artists.

== Composition ==
In the modern English-speaking world, the term crayon is commonly associated with the standard wax crayon, such as those widely available for use by children. Such crayons are usually approximately 3.5 inches (89 mm) in length and made mostly of paraffin wax. Paraffin wax is heated and cooled to achieve the correct temperature, at which a usable wax substance can be dyed, manufactured and then shipped for use around the world. Paraffin waxes are used for cosmetics, candles, for the preparation of printing ink, fruit preserving, in the pharmaceutical industry, for lubricating purposes, and for manufacturing crayons.

Colin Snedeker, a chemist for Binney & Smith (the then-parent company of Crayola), developed the first washable crayons in response to consumer complaints regarding stained fabrics and walls. A patent for the washable solid marking composition utilized in the washable crayons was awarded to Snedeker in 1990.

== History ==
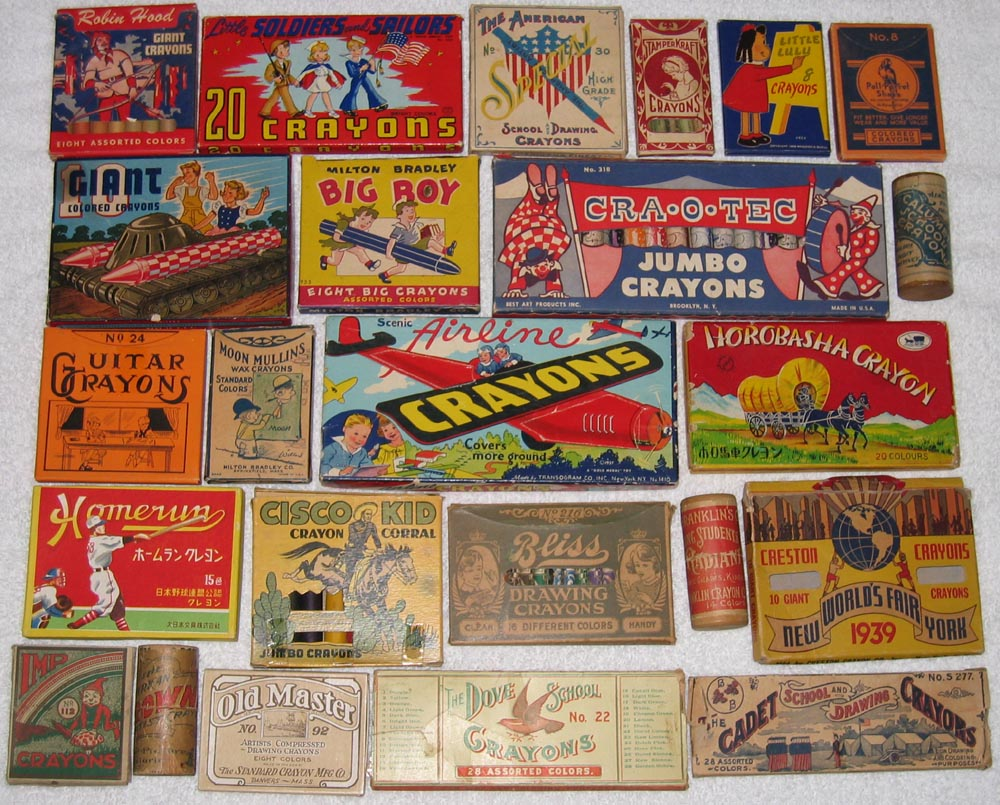
A wide variety of crayon boxes have been produced over the years.

The history of the crayon is not entirely clear. The French word crayon, originally meaning "chalk pencil", dates to around the 16th century, and is derived from the word craie (chalk), which comes from the Latin word creta (Earth). The meaning later changed to simply "pencil", which it still means in modern French.

The notion to combine a form of wax with pigment goes back thousands of years. Encaustic painting is a technique that uses hot beeswax combined with colored pigment to bind color into stone. A heat source was then used to "burn in" and fix the image in place. Pliny the Elder, a Roman scholar, was thought to describe the first techniques of wax crayon drawings.

This method, employed by the Egyptians, Romans, Greeks, and indigenous people in the Philippines, is still used today. However, the process was not used to make crayons into a form intended to be held and colored with and was therefore ineffective for use in a classroom or as crafts for children.

Contemporary crayons are purported to have originated in Europe, where some of the first cylinder shaped crayons were made with charcoal and oil. Pastels are an art medium sharing roots with the modern crayon and date back to Leonardo da Vinci in 1495. Conté crayons, out of Paris, are a hybrid between a pastel and a conventional crayon, used since the late 1790s as a drawing crayon for artists. Later, various hues of powdered pigment eventually replaced the primary charcoal ingredient found in most early 19th century products. References to crayons in literature appear as early as 1813 in Jane Austen's Pride and Prejudice. French lithographer Joseph Lemercier was also one of the inventors of the modern crayon. Through his Paris business circa 1828, he produced a variety of crayon and color related products. But even as those in Europe were discovering that substituting wax for the oil strengthened the crayon, various efforts in the United States were also developing.

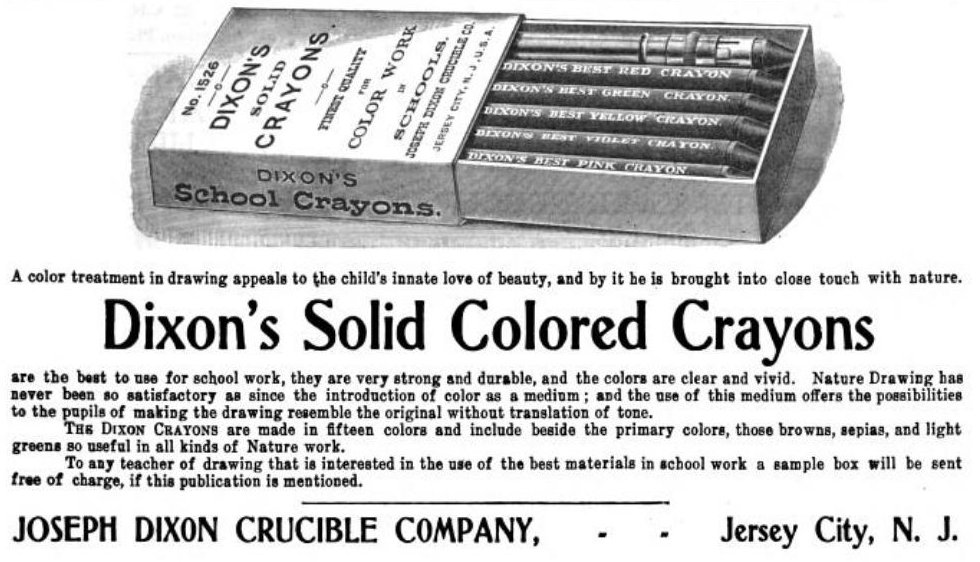
Early Dixon crayon ad from August 1901

The initial era of wax crayons saw several companies and products competing for the lucrative education and artist markets. The Franklin Mfg. Co, founded in 1876 in Rochester, New York, was one of the first companies to make and sell wax crayons, and in 1883 they appeared with a display of crayons at the World's Columbian Exposition that year.

Some of the earliest records of the modern paraffin wax crayon comes from Charles A. Bowley of Massachusetts, who developed wax coloring crayons in the late 1880s. Bowley had been selling various stationery items in the vicinity of Danvers and had developed clumps of colored wax designed for marking leather. With the need for more accuracy, he went back to his home and formed the wax crayons into more manageable cylinder shapes similar to that of a pencil. He packaged his crayons into decorative boxes and offered them through stationer clients he knew. The demand for his crayons soon exceeded his ability to keep up with production and he partnered with the American Crayon Company, who had been producing chalk crayons, in 1902.

Edwin Binney and C. Harold Smith had been long established in the coloring marketplace through Binney's Peekskill, New York, chemical works making lampblack by burning whale and carbon black, as well as their chalk products. In 1902, they developed and introduced the Staonal marking crayon. A year later in 1903, Edwin Binney's wife, Alice Stead Binney, coined the name Crayola by combining the French word for chalk, craie, with the first part of oleaginous, another name for the paraffin wax used to make the crayon. Binney and Smith were quick to capitalize on their creation, selling boxes of various sizes and color pallets. The Rubens Crayola line started in 1903 as well, aimed at artists and designed to compete with the Raphael brand of crayons from Europe.

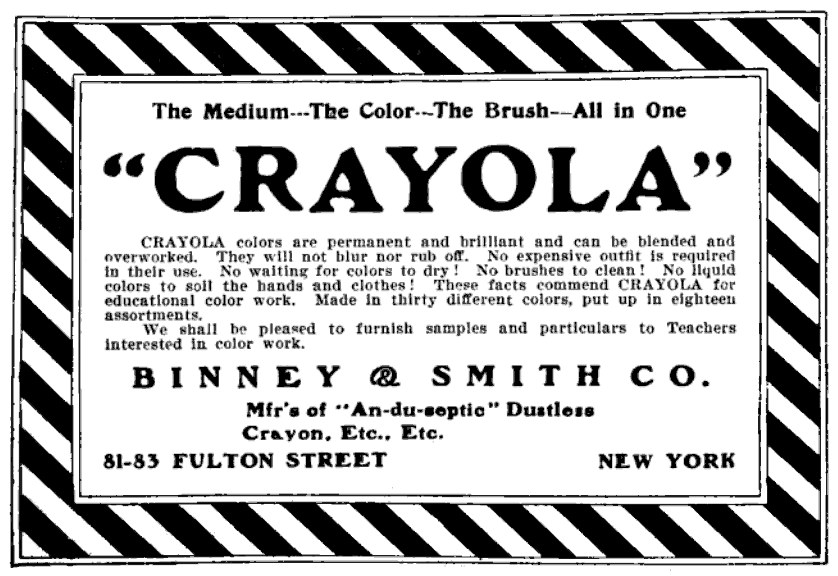
March 1905 ad from Crayola

Their most recognizable brand was the Crayola "Gold Medal" line in yellow boxes, which referred to one the company earned with their An-du-Septic dustless chalk during the March 1904 St. Louis World's Fair. They used the award to design a new line of crayons featuring the medal on the front of their box. Initially, they developed and introduced the No. 8 box of eight assorted colors, which became an immediate success; it was even featured on a postage stamp in early 1905. From there they began to phase out other Crayola crayon boxes until their line of Crayola crayons featured the Gold Medal design.

Hundreds of companies entered the crayon market, but only a few exist today, with Crayola dominating the market in the United States. That brand become a generic trademark also used to describe other brands' crayons. In all, there were over 300 documented crayon manufacturers in the United States and many more in other countries.

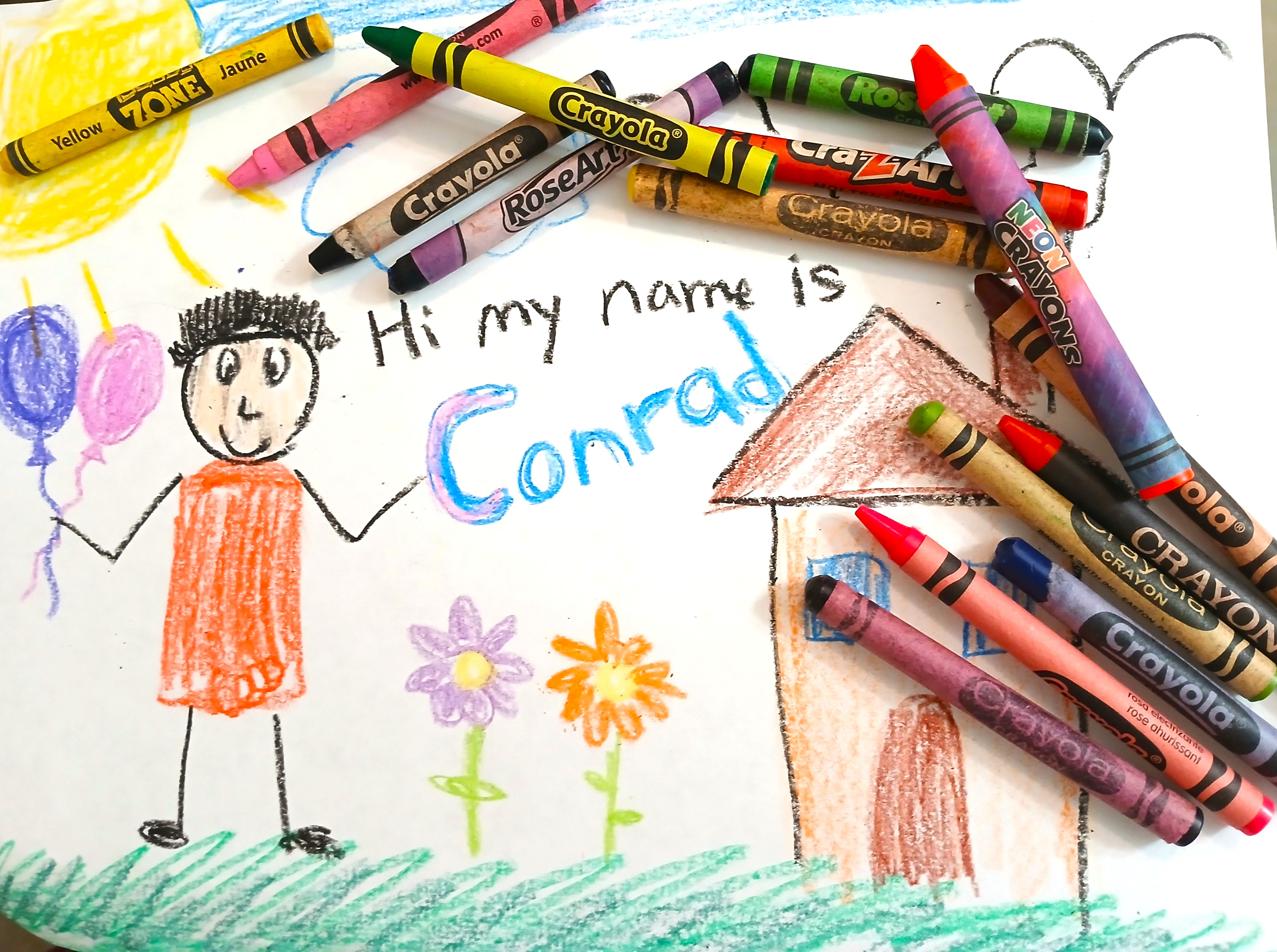
Assortment of crayons next to a drawing done in crayon

=== Today ===
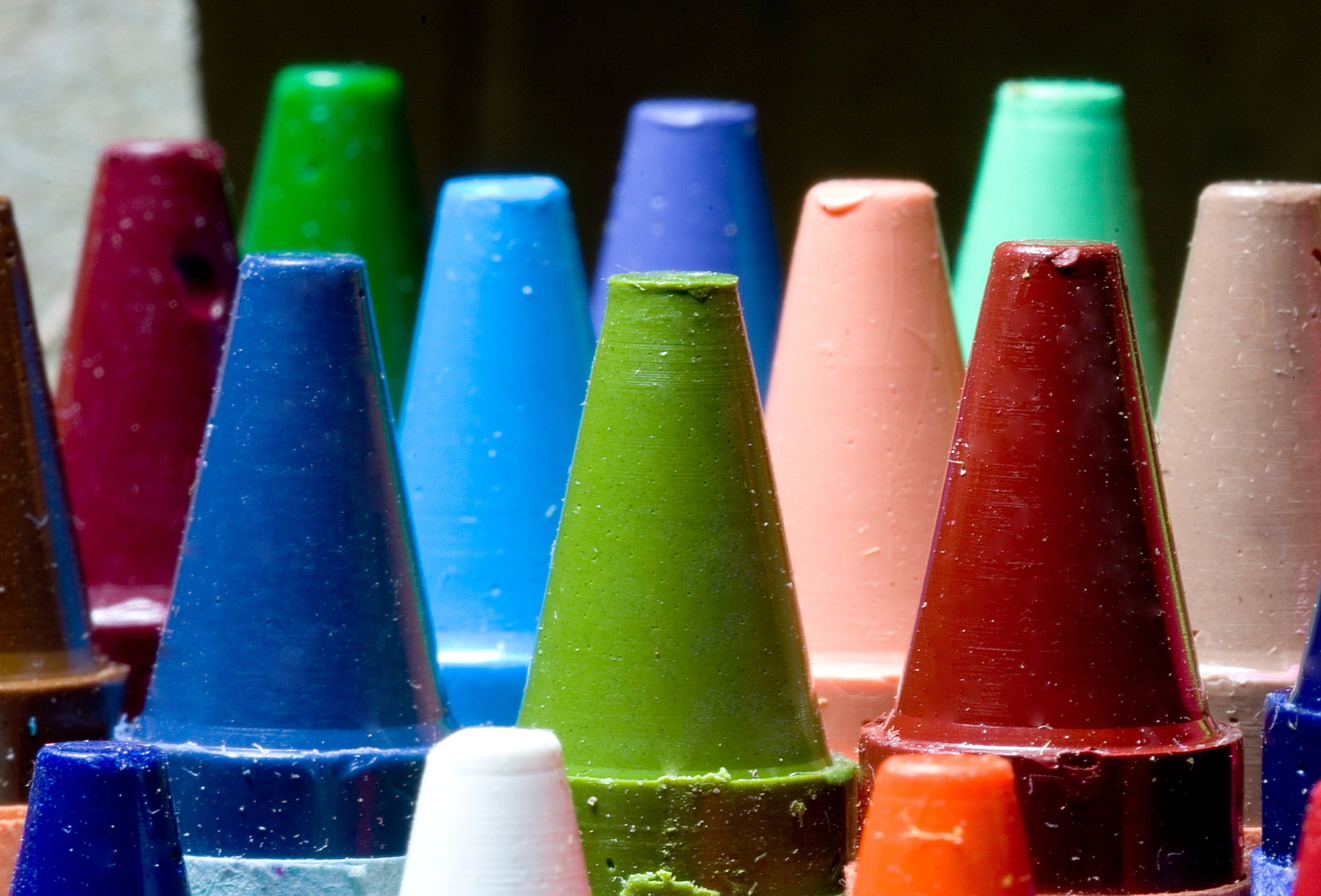
An assortment of Crayola crayons

Beyond Crayola, other brand name crayon manufacturers today include Rose Art Industries and Dixon Ticonderoga, the successor to the American Crayon Company. Numerous suppliers create generic brand or store brand crayons. These are typically found in supermarkets.

In 2000, there was concern about potential contamination of asbestos in many popular brands of crayons after the Seattle Post-Intelligencer reported in May of that year that they had tests performed finding that three brands of crayons contained asbestos. In a follow-up study released in June the U.S. Consumer Product Safety Commission (CPSC) found traces of asbestos fibers in three crayons and larger amounts of transitional fibers which can be misinterpreted as asbestos as a result of using talc as a binding agent in additional crayons. CPSC declared the risk to be low, but said that because of the concerns it had asked manufacturers to reformulate the concerned crayons and commended them for their swift agreement to do so.

== Artists ==
Early French artists, including François Clouet (1510–1572) and Nicolas Lagneau (1590–1666), used crayons in their early art projects. Clouet used crayons for his modeled portraits, which were so elaborate that he caught the attention of Henry V, who knighted him. He became a court painter for the royalty, and his entire art career began with and consisted of wax crayon art. Lagneau illustrated his portraits with outlines in wax crayons, and with tints of watercolor. His portraits were often of people who looked surprised or unaware of their surroundings.

Sister Gertrude Morgan was most known for preaching the Gospel around New Orleans with simple and easy-to-understand crayon drawings. Morgan caught the eye of a gallery owner E. Lorenz Borenstein, and was allowed to show her work, play her music and spread her word of God at the gallery. Her early drawings were that of just very modest and simple crayon drawings, depicting biblical text to provide a clearer image to those who were unfamiliar with the Bible. Morgan went on to publish a record of her biblical songs and has artwork featured in the American Folk Art Museum in New York.

== See also ==
- Grease pencil
- List of art media
- List of Crayola crayon colors
- Conté crayons
- Photo-crayotype
- Trois crayons
- Crayon-eating Marine trope
