= Theodore Wassmer =

American painter

Theodore Milton Wassmer
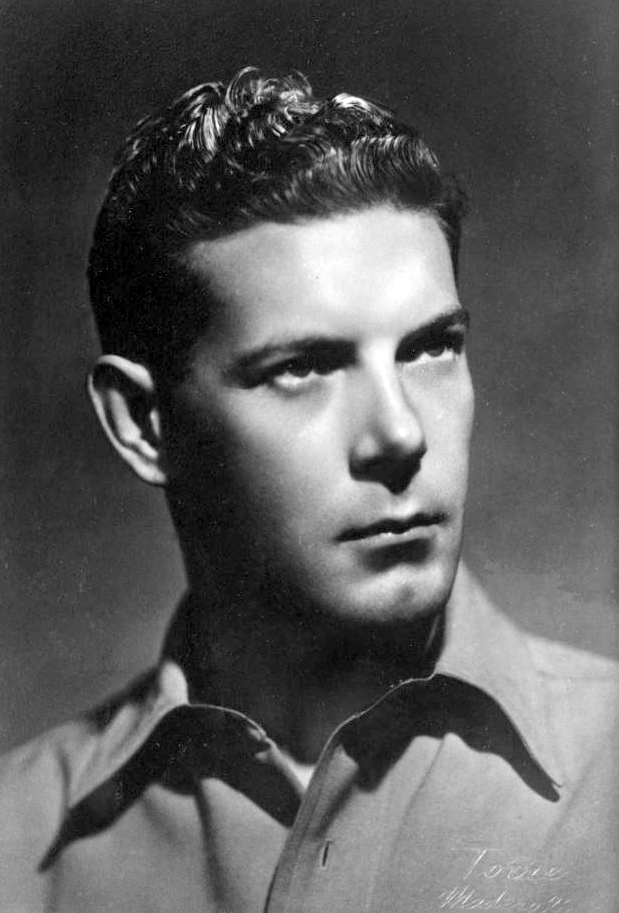
- Born: February 23, 1910; Salt Lake City, Utah, U.S.
- Died: November 26, 2006 (aged 96); Salt Lake City, Utah, U.S.
- Occupation: Artist
- Spouse: Judy Farnsworth

Theodore Milton Wassmer (February 23, 1910 – November 26, 2006) was an American painter. Wassmer was interested in art at a young age, but decided to become an artist after attending the 1934 Chicago World's Fair. He supported his family throughout the Great Depression. Wassmer has studied under multiple teachers and studied the work of painters in museums. He served in the U.S. Army Air Corps during World War II. He has donated several of his paintings to several museums in Utah. He produced more than 2,000 works of art including paintings, watercolors, and sketches that are displayed in museums around the world. In his personal life, he married fellow artist Judy Farnsworth Lund in December 1945.

== Early life ==
Theodore "Ted" Milton Wassmer was born on February 23, 1910, in Salt Lake City, Utah. His parents were Theodore James and Hester Hall Wassmer. He was the oldest of their eight children. His father worked in the lumber business. As a child, Wassmer played sports like baseball, basketball, and fishing. He also taught himself to play the piano.

Wassmer always had an interest in colors and the different color combinations. He would study the different colors and patterns found in nature. Wassmer recalls getting a dime for Christmas one year. Instead of buying candy like his siblings, he bought a box of crayons. He took an art class in the seventh grade, but was not exposed to an oil painting until he met Frank Zimbeaux, a French painter, in 1927. Wassmer bought one of his paintings and tried to copy the technique at home.

== Career ==
In 1925, Wassmer was forced to drop out of school due to financial difficulties. He went to work in an engraving and printing company where he made Christmas cards, and worked with a paper embossing machine. In 1929, Wassmer went to work at a wholesale hardware company. His father gave him a 1916 Model T touring car, and he drove it to Yellowstone National Park to sketch landscapes. The following year, his family members all lost their jobs in the Great Depression.

When he was only 21 years old, Wassmer supported his family of ten during the Great Depression on his $55 monthly income. He was able to buy oil paint in 1933, and made his own canvas boards so he could paint. In 1934, he attended the Chicago World's Fair. He was influenced to become an artist after seeing artwork from the old masters. From 1934 to 1939, Wassmer had the opportunity to study landscape painting with Florence E. Ware. He worked on murals with her for three years in Kingsbury Hall at the University of Utah.

=== World War II service ===
Wassmer received a job offer from Paramount Studios in 1941; however, he gave up the opportunity to enlist in World War II. Wassmer was enlisted in the U.S. Army Air Corps from 1942 to 1945. He was stationed at Sheppard Field, Texas, for basic training during that time. He sometimes played the piano for the other servicemen. When he was off-duty, Wassmer enjoyed practicing his art, and even painted several murals.

While in the military, there were several furloughs, and in 1944, he was able to visit Mexico and see Diego Rivera's studio. However, while on this trip, he experienced a sharp pain in his side. Doctors there told him it was appendicitis and he chose to be operated on immediately. After the surgery, he could not move his right arm, which was his painting arm. He was told that the arm was probably just twisted during surgery and that it would go away. After he returned to the U.S., doctors discovered that the fifth cervical nerve was pulled from the back bone and had hemorrhaged, resulting in paralysis. He was discharged from the Air Corps in October 1945. Although Wassmer had received shipping orders to go overseas on four occasions, he was never sent due to sicknesses and his accident.

=== Artist ===
In December 1945, Wassmer was married to Judy Farnsworth Lund in New York City. The couple had known each other since the 1930s. Judy was also an artist. Wassmer studied for four years at the Art Students' League. He was taught there by Yasuo Kuniyoshi, and later by Raphael Soyer. Wassmer studied Impressionist paintings and the works of Paul Cézanne. He often copied works from the old masters from the Metropolitan Museum of Art as well. He opened a portrait studio in Carnegie Hall, but found that he did not enjoy painting portraits.

In 1952, he and his wife moved to Woodstock, New York, where they lived for 33 years. They painted and showed their art throughout the city, trading and purchasing art as well. After their move, Wassmer got a job in the accounting division of an electronics plant. He worked there until February 1970, when he quit to devote himself to his artwork full-time. While living in New York City, he and his wife traveled to Europe together to study in famous museums. Wassmer had his art exhibited in 1968 for Rotron Inc. He won a first place award at the Electrical Electronics Engineers show at the Coliseum in New York City. He also had a solo art exhibit in at the Albany Institute of History and Art.

== Later life ==
In 1985, he and his wife returned to Salt Lake City. They decided to donate their works to various museums in the state of Utah. Wassmer also has art displayed in Europe and Japan. His wife died in 1996 of a stroke. Wassmer was given the Michael O. Leavitt Governor's award in 2000. He also wrote his own biography, entitled Color, the Catalyst. February 23 was pronounced Theodore Wassmer Day in Utah in 2005 by Jon Huntsman Jr., a Utah governor, and Ross C. Anderson, Salt Lake City mayor. He died on November 26, 2006, in a Salt Lake City nursing home.

During his lifetime, he produced over 2,000 works of art including paintings, watercolors, and sketches that are displayed in museums. Because of the paralysis in his arm, Wassmer could not paint large canvases. His works from before World War II are signed "Milton Wassmer". After returning from the war, he signed "T. Milton Wassmer", and after 1946, he just signed his last name.
