= Edwin Binney =

American entrepreneur and inventor

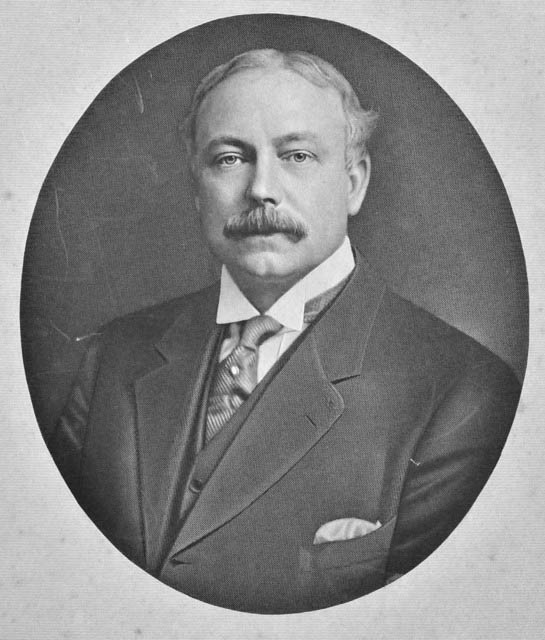
- Born: November 24, 1866; Shrub Oak, New York, U.S.
- Died: December 17, 1934 (aged 68); Gainesville, Florida, U.S.
- Occupations: Entrepreneur; inventor
- Years active: 1885–1934
- Known for: Creator of dustless chalk Co-founder of Crayola

Edwin Binney (November 24, 1866 – December 17, 1934) was an American entrepreneur and inventor, who created the first dustless white chalk, and along with his cousin C. Harold Smith (born London, 1860 - died, 1931), was the founder of handicrafts company Binney & Smith, which marketed his invention of the Crayola crayon. The Binney family lived in Old Greenwich, Connecticut, as well as Fort Pierce, Florida.

== Biography ==
Binney was born in Shrub Oak, New York. In 1885, he took control of his father's business, Peekskill Chemical Co. While experimenting with a mixture of slate waste, cement, and talc, Binney created the first dustless white chalk. The invention was awarded a gold medal at the St. Louis World's Fair in 1904.

He co-founded the firm Binney & Smith, which in 1902 had created a new wax crayon used to mark crates and barrels, but it was loaded with carbon black and too toxic for use by children. They were confident that the pigment and wax mixing techniques they had developed could be adapted to make safe wax crayons in a variety of colors. Binney also put forward the idea of black tires, again using carbon black, which strengthens the rubber and makes it more thermally conductive.

Binney produced the first box of "Crayola" crayons in 1903. His wife, Alice Binney, created the portmanteau name of the brand by combining elements of two words: craie (French for chalk) and ola for "oleaginous" (meaning "oily"), since the crayons were made using a petroleum-based wax.

Around 1914, Binney began spending more time in southeastern Florida, as he was an avid fisherman, and the family soon began to winter there after purchasing a large acreage north of the city of Fort Pierce, Florida.

Binney was a community activist. He was responsible for Fort Pierce becoming a port city in 1921, funding a channel to be cut across Hutchinson Island. In 1929, he helped to keep the St. Lucie County Bank from succumbing to the poor economic conditions prevalent at that time.

== Personal life ==
Binney was married to Alice Stead Binney (1866–1960), a London school teacher. Their land holding at Fort Pierce had been called Fort Pierce Farms, but Alice renamed it "Indrio", another portmanteau, from "Indian" (for the nearby Indian River) and rio (Spanish for river).

They had four children: Dorothy Binney, Helen Binney Kitchel, Mary, and Edwin Jr. Their daughter Helen became a four-time member of the Connecticut legislature. Their daughter Mary married a tree surgeon, James A.G. Davey. Their son, Edwin Jr, was an international swimmer and professor at Yale.
