= Goodwillie =

Goodwillie is a surname. Notable people with the surname include:

- David Goodwillie (born 1989), Scottish footballer
- David Goodwillie (author) (born 1972), American writer
- Thomas Goodwillie (disambiguation), multiple people

== See also ==
- Goodwillie–Allen House, a historical house in Bend, Oregon, United States
