= National Register of Historic Places listings in Deschutes County, Oregon =

Location of Deschutes County in Oregon

This list presents the full set of buildings, structures, objects, sites, or districts designated on the National Register of Historic Places in Deschutes County, Oregon, United States, and offers brief descriptive information about each of them. The National Register recognizes places of national, state, or local historic significance across the United States. Out of over 90,000 National Register sites nationwide, Oregon is home to over 2,000, and 47 of those are found partially or wholly in Deschutes County.

This National Park Service list is complete through NPS recent listings posted January 9, 2026.

== Current listings ==
	Name on the Register	Image	Date listed	Location	City or town	Description
1	Bend Amateur Athletic Club Gymnasium	Bend Amateur Athletic Club Gymnasium	November 25, 1983 (#83004165)	Northeast corner of Wall and Idaho Streets; 44°03′21″N 121°19′01″W	Bend	Built in 1917–1918 and funded largely by public subscription, this building symbolizes the spirit of civic boosterism that prevailed in Bend's early years. It combines Jacobean and Art Nouveau (Note: Art Nouveau is referred to in the source document as "New Art" and "Jungenstil".) architectural elements, and is one of very few Art Nouveau-inspired buildings in Oregon. (Note: For another prominent Art Nouveau building in Oregon, see Vista House.)
2	Bend High School	Bend High School	September 23, 1993 (#93000916)	529 NW Wall Street; 44°03′23″N 121°18′59″W	Bend	
3	Bend Skyliners Lodge	Bend Skyliners Lodge	June 13, 1978 (#78002285)	Skyliners Road, 11 miles (18 km) west of Bend, Deschutes National Forest; 44°01′52″N 121°31′19″W	Bend vicinity	
4	Charles Boyd Homestead Group	Charles Boyd Homestead Group	August 31, 1982 (#82003724)	20410 Rivermall Avenue; 44°05′03″N 121°18′07″W	Bend	
5	Peter Byberg House	Peter Byberg House	March 5, 1998 (#98000204)	153 NW Jefferson Place; 44°03′11″N 121°19′15″W	Bend	
6	Central Oregon Canal Historic District (Ward Road – Gosney Road Segment)		March 18, 2019 (#100003461)	Bounded by Ward Road and Gosney Road, between Bear Creek Road and Somerset Drive; 44°02′47″N 121°13′00″W	Bend vicinity	Carey and Reclamation Acts Irrigation Projects in Oregon, 1901-1978 MPS
7	Congress Apartments	Congress Apartments	September 1, 2000 (#00001020)	221–229 NW Congress Street; 44°03′19″N 121°19′21″W	Bend	This apartment building was the scene of a dynamite explosion in 1926, targeting a State Prohibition Officer in retaliation for the fatal shooting of a suspected moonshiner. The attack highlights the extreme tensions between "wets" and "drys" in Central Oregon during the Prohibition era. The 1924 building is also notable for its Craftsman styling.
8	Ed and Genevieve Deedon Homestead		March 6, 2013 (#13000057)	15600 Deedon Road; 43°43′08″N 121°32′25″W	La Pine vicinity	
9	Deschutes County Library	Deschutes County Library	September 23, 1993 (#93000914)	507 NW Wall Street; 44°03′23″N 121°19′03″W	Bend	
10	Downing Building	Downing Building	November 26, 2004 (#04001262)	1033–1035 NW Bond Street; 44°03′35″N 121°18′43″W	Bend	
11	Drake Park Neighborhood Historic District	Drake Park Neighborhood Historic District	June 3, 2005 (#05000380)	Roughly bounded by Broadway Street, Riverside Boulevard, Turnalo Avenue, and Franklin Avenue; 44°03′30″N 121°19′10″W	Bend	
12	Elk Lake Guard Station	Elk Lake Guard Station	April 23, 2009 (#09000240)	Forest Road 46, Deschutes National Forest; 43°58′58″N 121°48′24″W	Bend vicinity	
13	First Presbyterian Church of Redmond	First Presbyterian Church of Redmond	September 3, 2001 (#01000931)	641 SE Cascade Avenue; 44°16′30″N 121°10′26″W	Redmond	
14	Jonathan N. B. Gerking Homestead	Jonathan N. B. Gerking Homestead	May 27, 1999 (#99000644)	65725 Gerking Market Road; 44°11′10″N 121°20′38″W	Bend	
15	Goodwillie–Allen House	Goodwillie–Allen House	May 25, 2007 (#07000493)	875 NW Brooks Street; 44°03′34″N 121°18′54″W	Bend	
16	Benjamin Hamilton House	Benjamin Hamilton House	March 15, 2000 (#00000228)	552 NW State Street; 44°03′29″N 121°19′11″W	Bend	
17	Hope–Van Allen House	Hope–Van Allen House	May 10, 2001 (#01000495)	352 NW Drake Road; 44°03′42″N 121°19′07″W	Bend	
18	I.O.O.F. Organization Camp, Paulina Lake	I.O.O.F. Organization Camp, Paulina Lake	July 14, 1983 (#83002148)	Forest Road 21, Newberry National Volcanic Monument, Deschutes National Forest; 43°42′22″N 121°15′28″W	LaPine vicinity	
19	Simpson E. Jones House	Simpson E. Jones House	March 15, 2000 (#00000227)	1535 NW Awbrey Road; 44°03′48″N 121°18′58″W	Bend	
20	Thomas McCann House	Thomas McCann House	April 1, 1980 (#80003311)	440 NW Congress Street; 44°03′24″N 121°19′11″W	Bend	
21	McKenzie Highway Historic District	McKenzie Highway Historic District	February 7, 2011 (#10001215)	Oregon Route 242; 44°14′55″N 121°50′18″W	Sisters to Belknap Springs	Extends into Linn and Lane counties.
22	Robert D. Moore House	Robert D. Moore House	May 19, 1999 (#99000603)	545 NW Congress Street; 44°03′28″N 121°19′10″W	Bend	
23	New Redmond Hotel	New Redmond Hotel	October 28, 1980 (#80003312)	521 S. 6th Street; 44°16′21″N 121°10′23″W	Redmond	
24	New Taggart Hotel	New Taggart Hotel	February 29, 1988 (#88000087)	215 NW Greenwood Avenue; 44°03′35″N 121°18′39″W	Bend	
25	O'Kane Building	O'Kane Building	November 6, 1986 (#86002965)	115 NW Oregon Avenue; 44°03′33″N 121°18′46″W	Bend	
26	Milton Odem House	Milton Odem House	February 21, 1997 (#97000139)	623 SW 12th Street; 44°16′16″N 121°10′51″W	Redmond	
27	Old Town Historic District	Old Town Historic District	June 29, 2001 (#01000681)	Roughly bounded by Arizona Avenue, Wall Street, Broadway Street, Franklin Avenue, and Division Street; 44°03′12″N 121°18′34″W	Bend	
28	Old US Post Office	Old US Post Office	February 14, 1985 (#85000293)	745 NW Wall Street; 44°03′29″N 121°18′56″W	Bend	
29	Paulina Lake Guard Station	Paulina Lake Guard Station	April 11, 1986 (#86000825)	Deschutes National Forest; 43°42′42″N 121°16′33″W	Bend	
30	Petersen Rock Garden	Petersen Rock Garden	October 30, 2013 (#13000859)	7930 SW 77th Street; 44°12′13″N 121°15′46″W	Redmond vicinity	
31	Pictograph Site		July 17, 2009 (#09000532)	Address restricted	Brothers	
32	Pilot Butte Canal: Downtown Redmond Segment Historic District	Pilot Butte Canal: Downtown Redmond Segment Historic District	July 10, 2017 (#100001303)	Along NW Canal Boulevard between NW Quince Avenue and NW Dogwood Avenue; 44°17′19″N 121°10′05″W	Redmond	
33	Pilot Butte Canal Historic District	Pilot Butte Canal Historic District	February 8, 2016 (#15001052)	Roughly bounded by Cooley, Overtree, and Yeoman Roads, and Brightwater Drive; 44°06′09″N 121°16′17″W	Bend	
34	George Palmer and Dorothy Binney Putnam House	George Palmer and Dorothy Binney Putnam House	May 29, 1998 (#98000607)	606 NW Congress Street; 44°03′28″N 121°19′06″W	Bend	
35	Redmond Downtown Historic District	Redmond Downtown Historic District	October 30, 2017 (#100001771)	Roughly along SW 6th Street between SW Cascade Avenue and SW Forest Avenue; 44°16′24″N 121°10′27″W	Redmond	
36	Reid School	Reid School	October 16, 1979 (#79002053)	460 NW Wall Street; 44°03′19″N 121°19′02″W	Bend	
37	Rock O' the Range Bridge	Rock O' the Range Bridge	November 29, 1979 (#79002054)	North of Bend; 44°07′23″N 121°17′07″W	Bend	
38	Santiam Wagon Road	Santiam Wagon Road	September 23, 2010 (#10000795)	Willamette National Forest and Deschutes National Forest; 44°25′29″N 121°50′44″W	Cascadia and Sisters vicinity	Extends into Linn County.
39	Evan Andreas Sather House	Evan Andreas Sather House	June 27, 1997 (#97000577)	7 NW Tumalo Avenue; 44°03′22″N 121°19′08″W	Bend	
40	Sisters High School	Sisters High School	March 2, 2006 (#06000095)	115 N. Locust Street; 44°17′28″N 121°32′36″W	Sisters	
41	N. P. Smith Pioneer Hardware Store	N. P. Smith Pioneer Hardware Store	April 5, 1984 (#84002980)	935–937 NW Wall Street; 44°03′34″N 121°18′50″W	Bend	
42	D. H. Sphier Building	D. H. Sphier Building	June 25, 2020 (#100005322)	901 NW Bond Street; 44°03′31″N 121°18′48″W	Bend	
43	B. A. and Ruth Stover House	B. A. and Ruth Stover House	February 20, 1992 (#92000061)	1 NW Rocklyn Road; 44°03′39″N 121°19′06″W	Bend	
44	Norman and Frances Swanson House		June 6, 2022 (#100007384)	327 NW Canyon Drive; 44°16′44″N 121°10′56″W	Redmond	
45	Trinity Episcopal Church	Trinity Episcopal Church	September 23, 1993 (#93000915)	469 NW Wall Street; 44°03′20″N 121°19′04″W	Bend	
46	Emil and Ottilie Wienecke House	Emil and Ottilie Wienecke House	May 29, 2008 (#08000472)	1325 NW Federal Street; 44°03′41″N 121°19′31″W	Bend	
47	William T. E. Wilson Homestead		March 5, 1998 (#98000205)	70300 Camp Polk Road; 44°18′16″N 121°30′08″W	Sisters	

== Former listings ==
	Name on the Register	Image	Date listed	Date removed	Location	City or town	Description
1	Pilot Butte Inn	Pilot Butte Inn	July 24, 1972 (#72001567)	1973	1121 Wall Street; 44°03′38″N 121°18′45″W	Bend	Built in 1917. Demolished in June 1973.
2	Shevlin–Hixon Mill Buildings		November 16, 1978 (#78002284)	October 13, 1987	Riverside Boulevard	Bend	

== See also ==
- National Register of Historic Places listings in Oregon
- Listings in neighboring counties: Crook, Harney, Jefferson, Klamath, Lake, Lane, Linn
- Historic preservation
- History of Oregon
- Lists of Oregon-related topics
