= Skyliners (disambiguation) =

Skyliners may refer to:

== Bands ==
- The Skyliners, a doo-wop group from Pittsburgh, USA
- "The Skyliners", a USAF dance band stationed at Ramey Air Force Base, Puerto Rico in the early 1950s as part of the 522nd Air Force Band that moved to March Air Force Base (now March Air Reserve Base) as part of the 523rd Air Force Band in the late 1950s (see List of United States Air Force Bands)
- "The Skyliners", a 'Big Band Dance Club' based in Lafayette, Louisiana
- "The Skyliners", a British big band formed at Catterick Garrison army base in 1945 that disbanded in 1947
- "The BYU Skyliners", a dance band formed by Donald Toomey in the late 1940s that was popular at Brigham Young University through the mid-1950s
- "The Skyliners Big Band", a dance band based in Barrie, Ontario
- "The Skyliners Dance Band", a big band based in Bangor, Maine
- "The Skyliners Band", playing ball room dancing music in Milwaukee, Wisconsin
- "Chicago Skyliners Big Band", based in Chicago, Illinois and broadcasting a weekly radio show on WDCB
- "Skyliners Drum and Bugle Corps, based in New York City
- "The Skyliners", an early rock and roll band born out of the skiffle era based in Manchester, England from 1955 to 1969
- "Lotus Skyliners", a largely Japanese Americans big band based out of Seattle, Washington and organized by the Seattle Betsuin Buddhist Temple
- "Jim Lloyd and the Skyliners", an American band playing bluegrass music and Appalachian music based in Rural Retreat, Virginia

== Sports ==
- Skyliners Frankfurt, a basketball club in Germany
- Chicago Skyliners, a defunct basketball team (later became Las Vegas Slam, Rattlers etc.)
- New York Skyliners, a defunct soccer team
- "Skyliners Synchronized Skating Team," a synchronized figure skating team based out of The Skating Club of New York and Windy Hill Figure Skating Club.
- "The Skyliners", a ski club formed in 1927 who built Bend, Oregon's first ski area, including the Bend Skyliners Lodge.

== Other uses ==
- "Portland Skyliners", a club for tall people in Portland, Oregon

== See also ==
- Skyline (disambiguation)
- Skylines (disambiguation)
- Skyliner (disambiguation)
