= Skyline (disambiguation) =

A skyline is the outline at the horizon caused by human or natural formations.

Skyline may also refer to:

== Geography ==
=== United States ===
- Skyline, Alabama
- Skyline, Minnesota
- Skyline, Tacoma, Washington
- Skyline, West Virginia
- Skyline Boulevard, a scenic highway in California
- Skyline Caverns, Virginia
- Skyline Drive, Shenandoah National Park, Virginia
- Skyline Ski Area, former name (1949–79) of Pebble Creek, Idaho

=== Elsewhere ===
- Skyline, Honiara, Solomon Islands
- Skyline, Ottawa, Canada, a neighbourhood
- Skyline (London), a residential tower

== Arts and media ==
=== Film ===
- Skyline (1931 film)
- Skyline (2010 film), a science fiction film

=== Journalism ===
- Skyline (newspaper), Chicago
- "Sky Line", an architecture column in The New Yorker by Paul Goldberger

=== Music ===
- Skyline (band), a "new grass" group headed by Tony Trischka
- Skyline (Gonzalo Rubalcaba album), 2021
- Skyline (Steve Howe album), 2002
- Skyline (Yann Tiersen album), 2011
- "Skyline", a song by Amaranthe from their 2014 album Massive Addictive
- "Skyline", a song by Broken Social Scene from their 2017 album Hug of Thunder
- "Skyline", a song by Dawn of Solace from their 2022 album Flames of Perdition
- "Skyline", a song by Erra from their 2016 album Drift
- "Skyline", a 2022 song by Khalid
- "Skyline", a song by Omnium Gatherum from their 2016 album Grey Heavens
- "Sky Line", a song by Up10tion from the 2021 album Connection

== Businesses ==
- Skyline (Nigeria), a passenger airline
- Skyline (Sweden), a defunct airline
- Sky Line for Air Services, an airline; see List of airline codes (S)
- Skyline Casino, in Henderson, Nevada
- Skyline Chili, a restaurant chain based in Cincinnati, Ohio
- Skyline Solar, a solar power company in California
- Skyline Queenstown, a tourism operation in New Zealand

== Schools ==
- Skyline College, California, US
- Skyline High School (disambiguation), any of several high schools
- Skyline University College (Sharjah), United Arab Emirates

== Technology ==
- Skyline (emulator), a Nintendo Switch emulator for Android devices
- Skyline matrix, a data storage matrix scheme
- Skyline operator, a database query filter method
- Skyline (software), bioinformatics software for spectrometric data analysis

== Transportation ==
- Skyline (Honolulu), a rapid transit system in Hawaiʻi
- SkyLine, a people mover system at Frankfurt Airport
- Nissan Skyline, an automobile manufactured first by Prince Motors, and later the Nissan Motor Company
- Skyline SL-222, a Ukrainian-made helicopter

== Other uses ==
- Skyline (construction set), a toy sold in the late 1950s and early 1960s
- Skyline (horse) (born 1955), an Australian Thoroughbred racehorse
- Skyline Conference, a college athletic conference in the New York City area
- Skyline logging, in forestry, a method of cable logging

== See also ==
- Skylines (disambiguation)
- Skyliner (disambiguation)
- Skyliners (disambiguation)
