= Peter Byberg House =

Historic house in Oregon, United States

- U.S. National Register of Historic Places
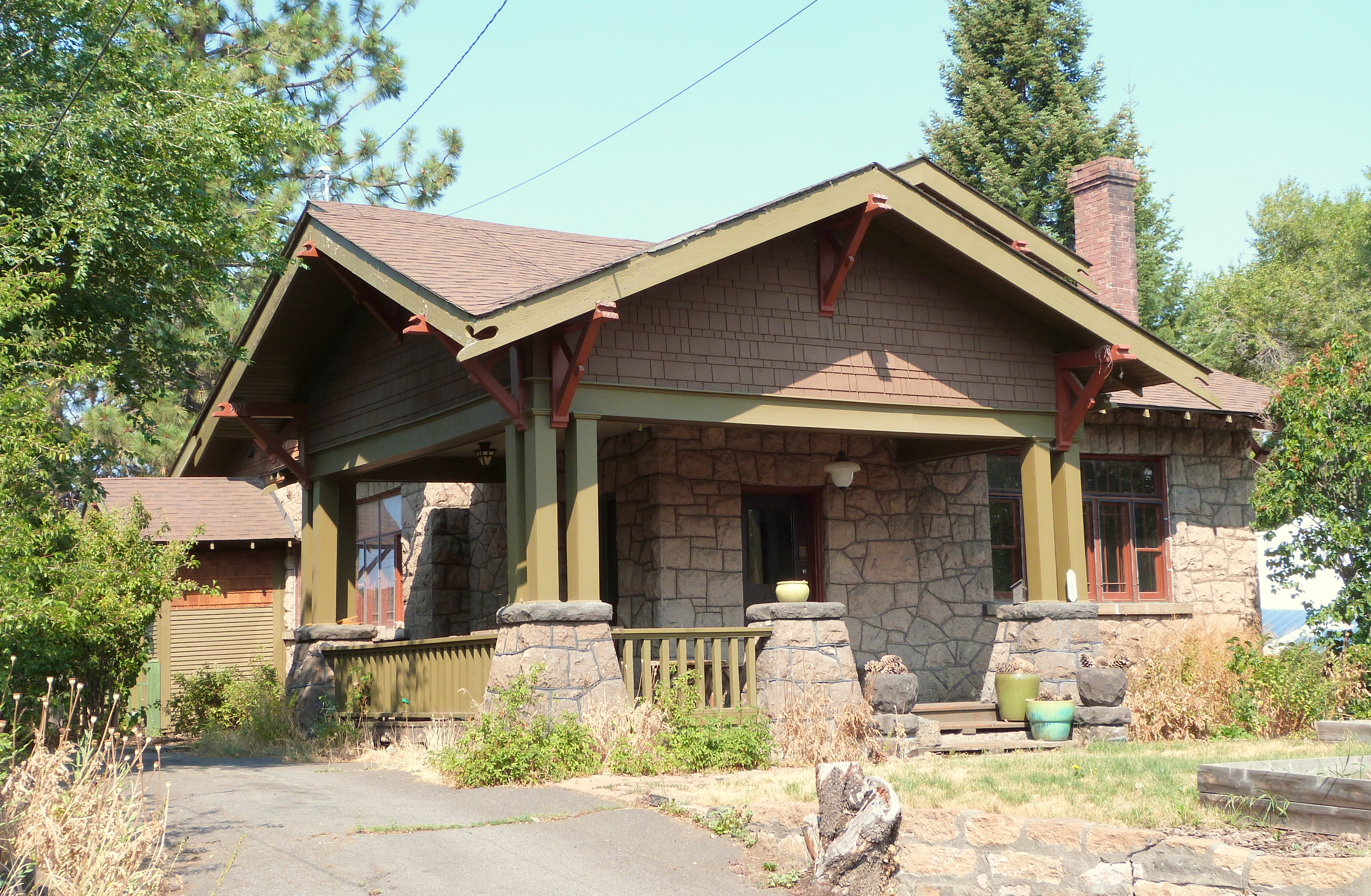
- Peter Byberg House in 2013

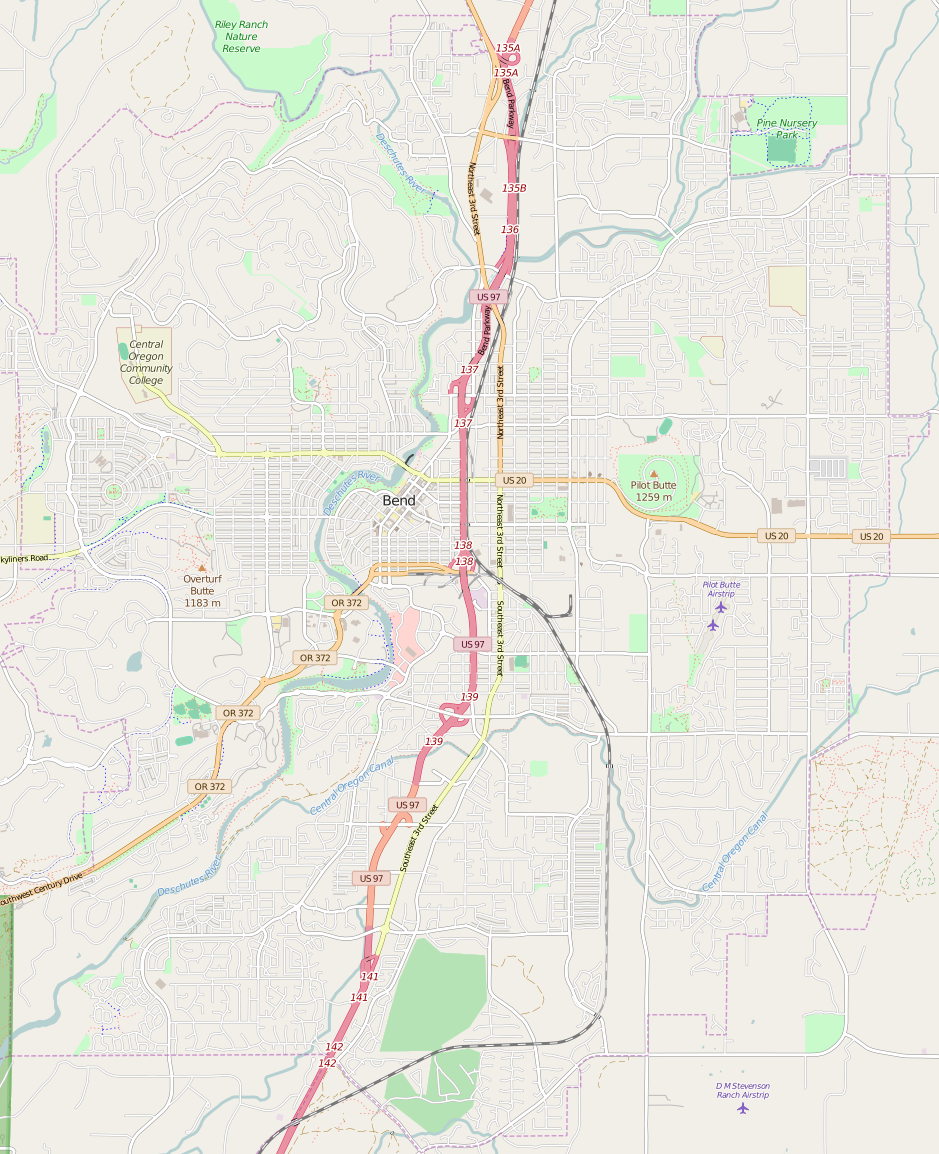
- Location within Bend OR Location within Oregon
- Location: 153 NW Jefferson Pl., Bend, Oregon
- Coordinates: 44°3′11″N 121°19′11″W
- Area: less than one acre
- Built: 1916
- Architect: Sears & Roebuck Company
- Architectural style: Bungalow/American Craftsman
- NRHP reference No.: 98000204
- Added to NRHP: March 5, 1998

The Peter Byberg House, located in Bend, Oregon, is an American Craftsman style house that was erected in 1916. It was ordered as a kit from the Sears & Roebuck Company. It was listed on the National Register of Historic Places in 1998.

== See also ==
- National Register of Historic Places listings in Deschutes County, Oregon
