= Congress Apartments =

- U.S. National Register of Historic Places
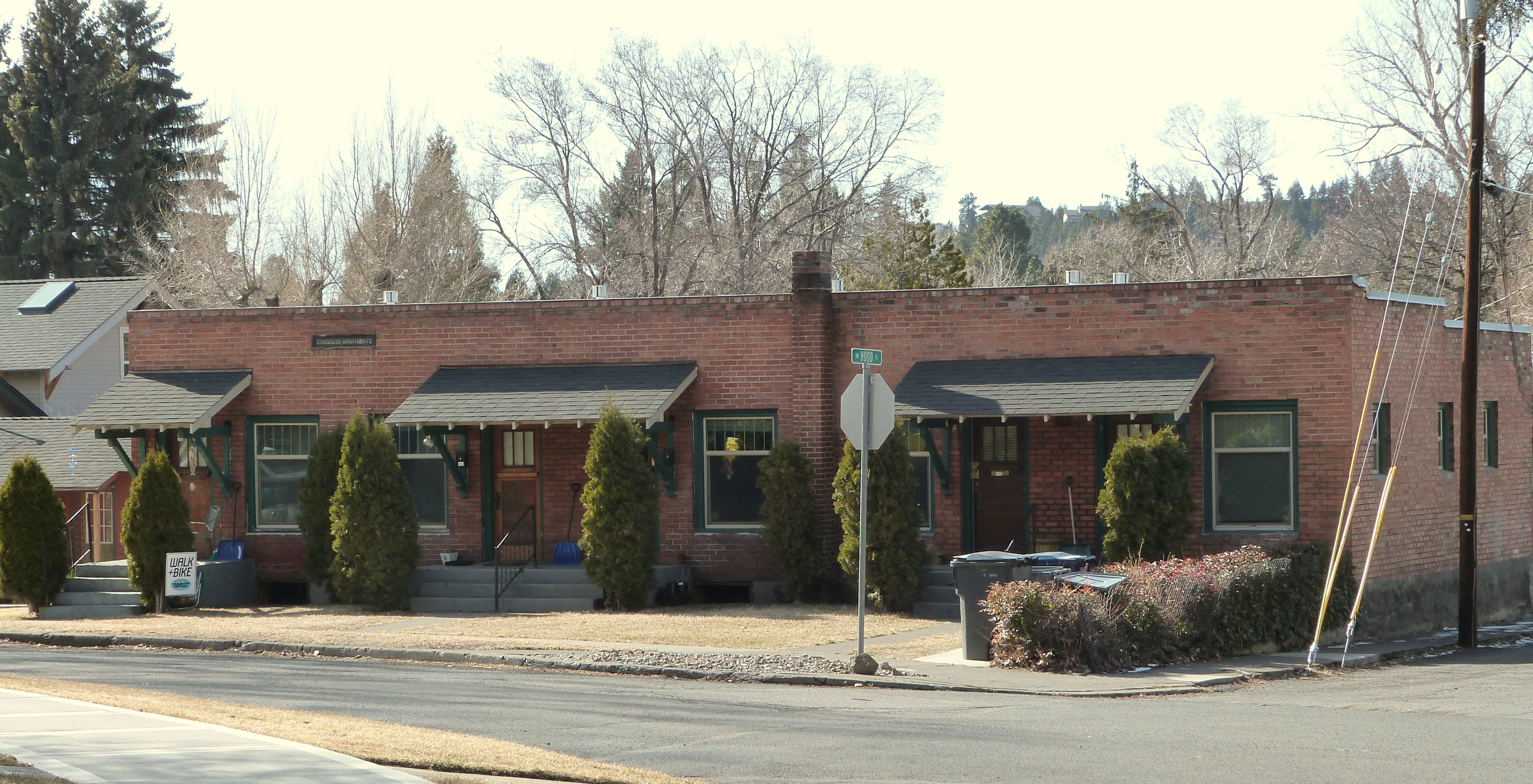
- The Congress Apartments in 2013

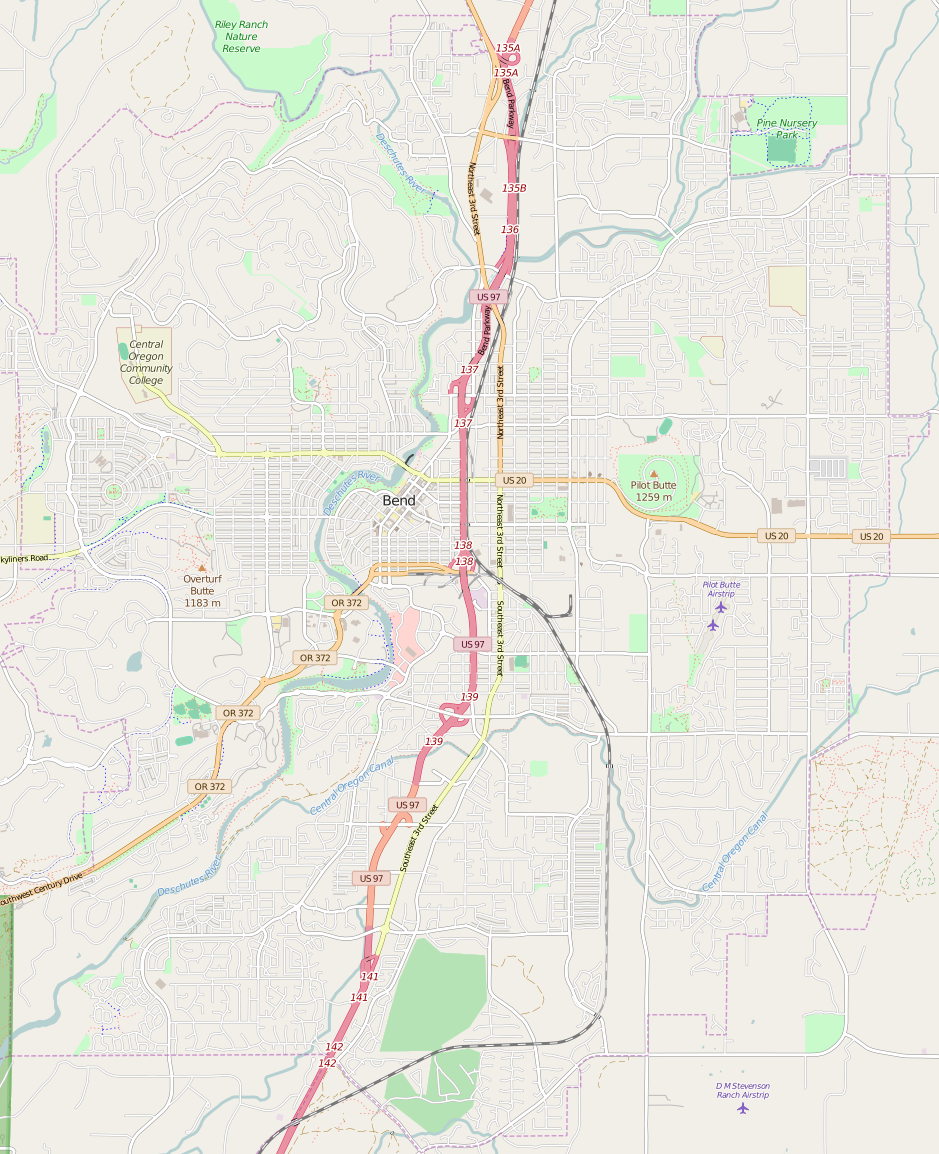
- Location within Bend OR Location within Oregon Location within the United States
- Location: 221–229 NW Congress Street; Bend, Oregon
- Coordinates: 44°03′19″N 121°19′21″W
- Area: Less than 1 acre (0.40 ha)
- Built: 1924
- Architectural style: Craftsman
- NRHP reference No.: 00001020
- Added to NRHP: September 1, 2000

The Congress Apartments are a historic apartment building in Bend, Oregon, United States, built in 1924. On the night of March 8, 1926, they were the scene of a dynamite explosion targeting A. F. Mariott, a State Prohibition Officer who lived in unit 5 with his wife. There were no injuries. Although police never identified any suspects, the attack was generally understood to be retaliation for the fatal shooting of Vayle Taylor, a suspected moonshiner in Crook County, on February 17. The attack highlights the extreme tensions between "wets" and "drys" in Central Oregon during the Prohibition era. Separately, the Congress Apartments possess high architectural value for their Craftsman styling, popular in Bend at the time but unusual among apartment buildings. Distinctive features include the use of disappearing, slide-out beds on the interior.

The apartment building was listed on the National Register of Historic Places in 2000.

== See also ==
- National Register of Historic Places listings in Deschutes County, Oregon
