= Robert D. Moore House =

Historic house in Oregon, United States

- U.S. National Register of Historic Places
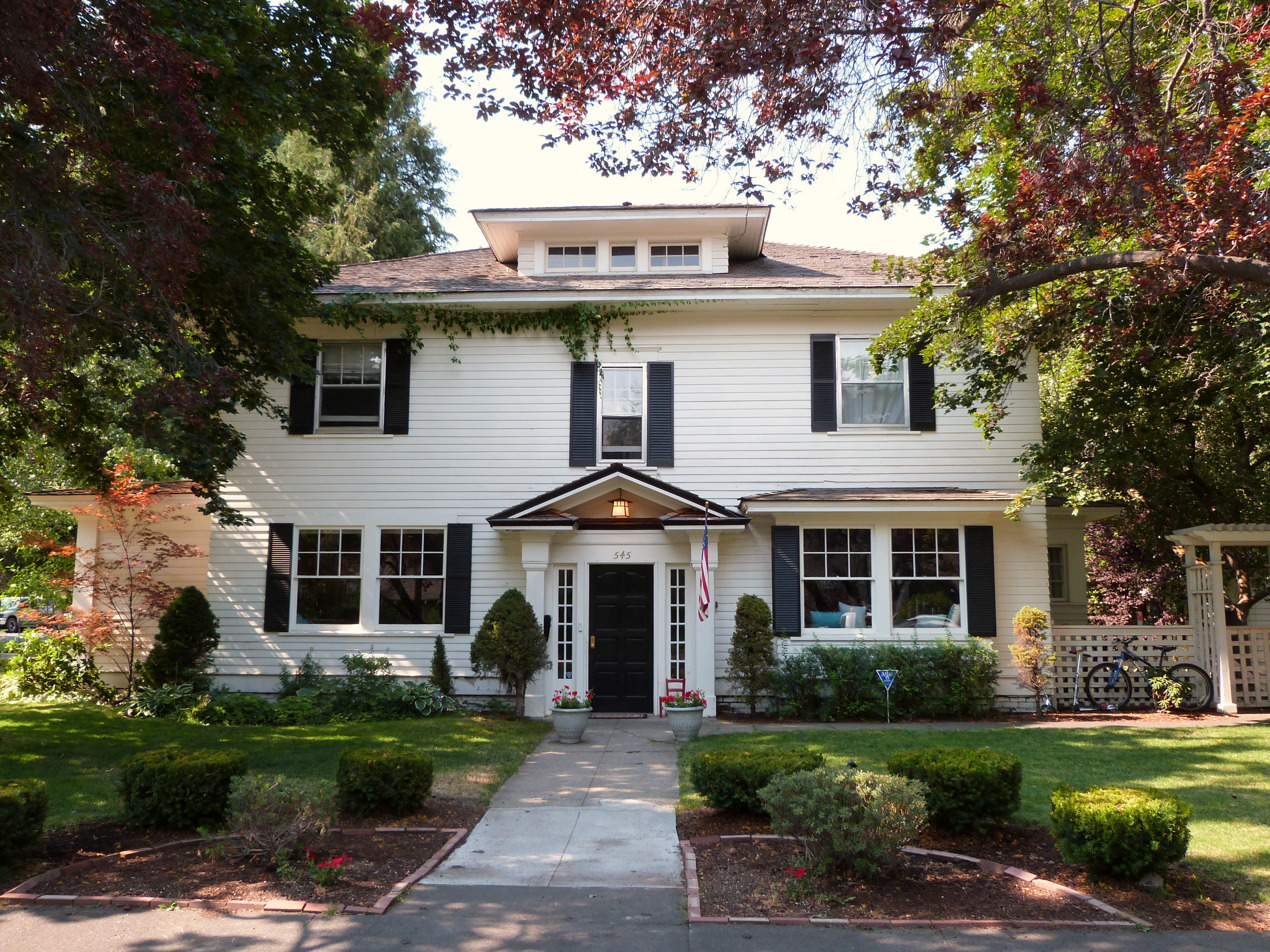
- Robert D. Moore House in 2013

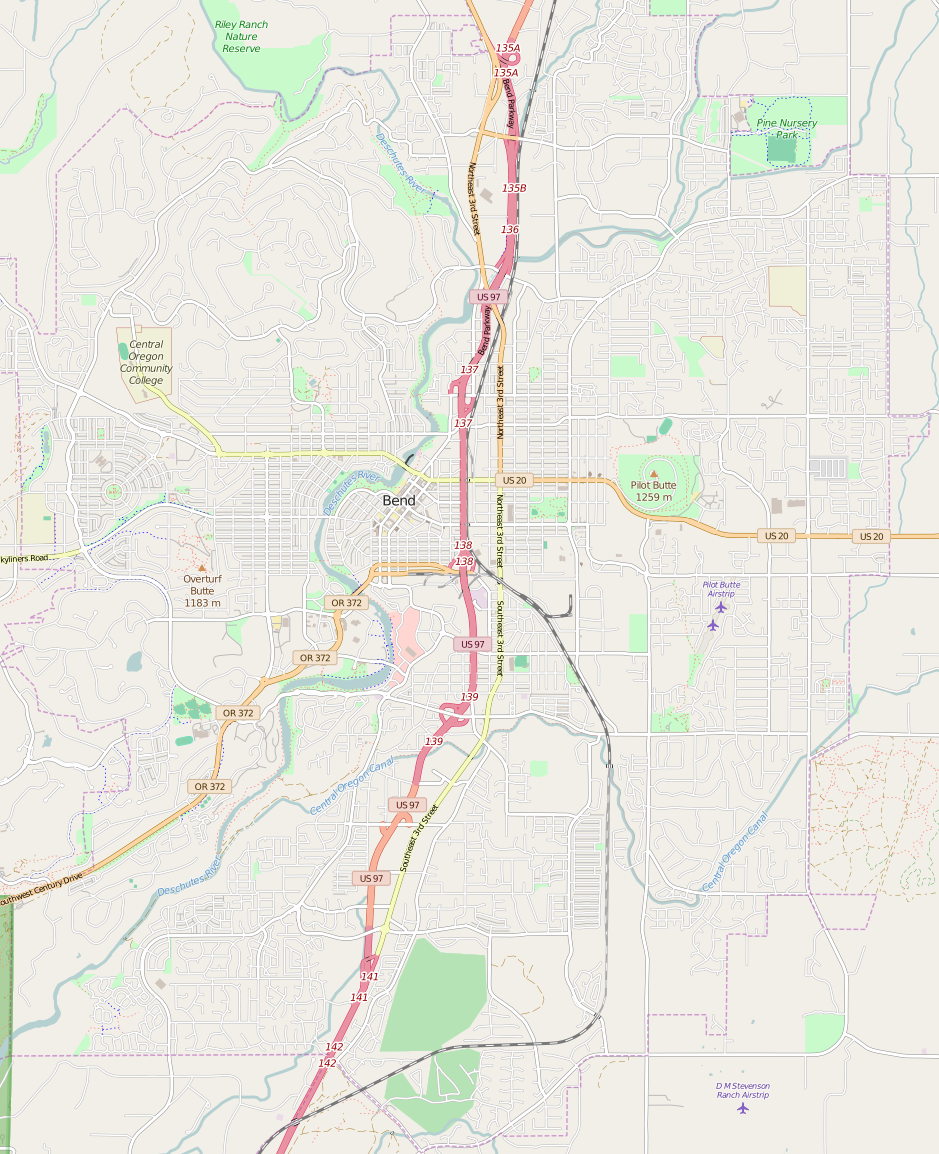
- Location within Bend OR Location within Oregon
- Location: 545 NW Congress St., Bend, Oregon
- Coordinates: 44°3′28″N 121°19′6″W
- Area: 0.3 acres (0.12 ha)
- Built: 1921
- Architectural style: Colonial Revival, American foursquare
- NRHP reference No.: 99000603
- Added to NRHP: May 19, 1999

The Robert D. Moore House, located in Bend, Oregon, is a house listed on the National Register of Historic Places.

== See also ==
- National Register of Historic Places listings in Deschutes County, Oregon
