= Skyliner (disambiguation) =

The Skyliner is a train service between Tokyo and Narita Airport.

Skyliner may also refer to:

- Disney Skyliner, a gondola system at Walt Disney World
- Ford Skyliner (disambiguation), various motor vehicles produced by Ford
- Neoplan Skyliner, a range of coaches produced by Neoplan
- Skyliner (roller coaster), Pennsylvania, USA
- Skyliner (Warsaw), a skyscraper in Warsaw, Poland
- Skyliner (band), a heavy metal band from Florida, USA
- "Skyliner", a jazz instrumental recorded by Charlie Barnet
- "Skyliner", a song by Boards of Canada on the EP Trans Canada Highway
- "Skyliner", a British big band associated with the 95th Bomb Group Heritage Association at the former RAF Horham
- Sky Liner (film), a 1949 American film directed by William A. Berke

== See also ==
- Skyline (disambiguation)
- Skylines (disambiguation)
- Skyliners (disambiguation)
