= Old U.S. Post Office (Bend, Oregon) =

- Old US Post Office
- U.S. National Register of Historic Places
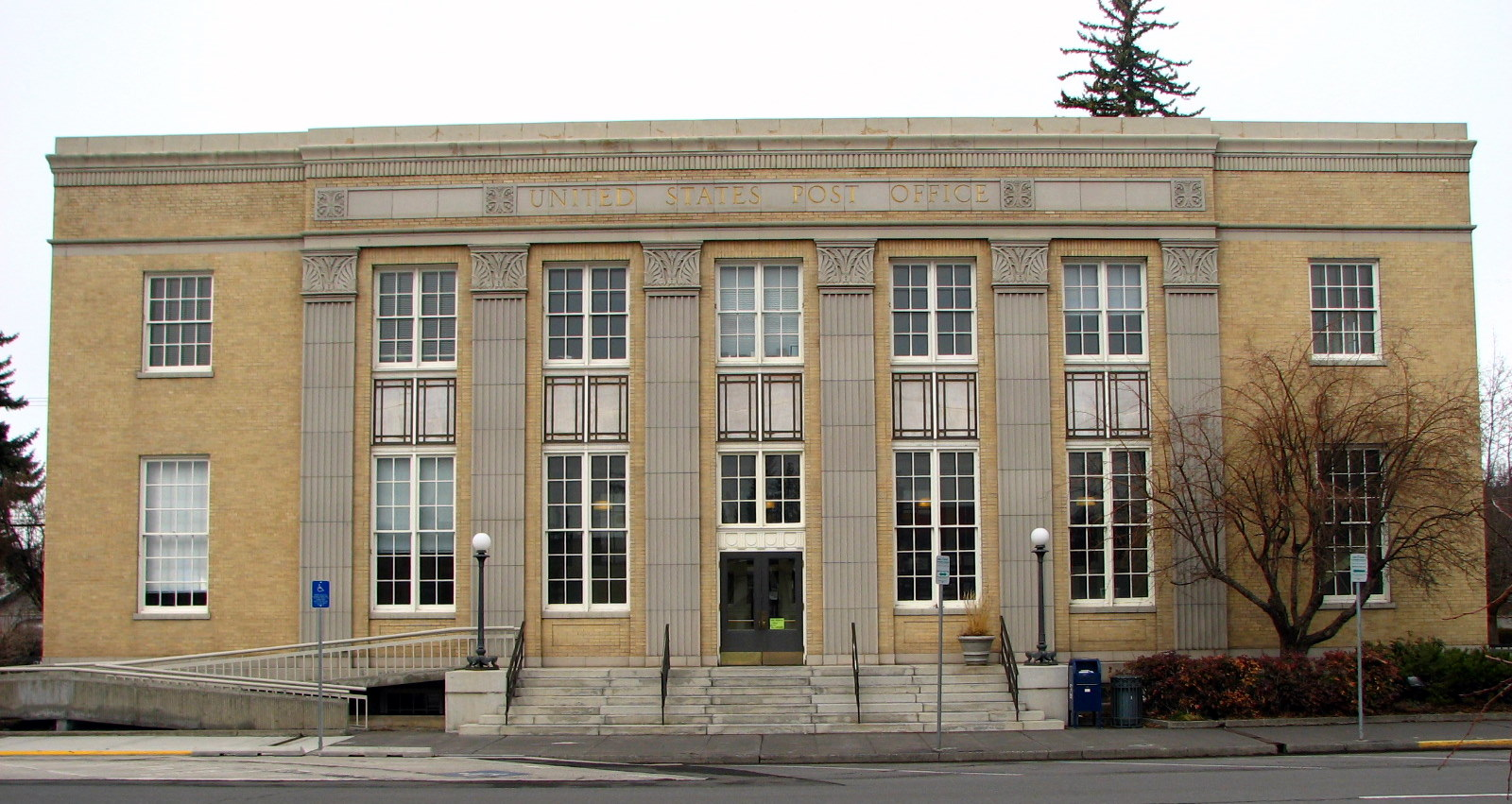

- Location within Oregon Location within the United States
- Interactive map showing the location of Old U.S. Post Office, Bend, Oregon
- Location: 745 NW Wall Street; Bend, Oregon
- Coordinates: 44°3′29″N 121°18′52″W
- Area: less than one acre
- Built: 1932
- Built by: Charles Weitz Sons, Inc.
- Architect: Office of the Supervising Architect under James A. Wetmore
- Architectural style: Stripped Classical
- MPS: Significant US Post Offices in Oregon 1900–1941 TR
- NRHP reference No.: 85000293
- Added to NRHP: February 14, 1985

The Old U.S. Post Office in Bend, Oregon, is a post office building that was built in 1932. It was listed on the National Register of Historic Places in 1985.

According to its NRHP nomination, "the Post Office is a noteworthy example in Oregon of Stripped Classical architecture in which historical ornament is subordinated to a modernistic emphasis of geometric volume."

== See also ==
- National Register of Historic Places in Deschutes County, Oregon
