= Simpson E. Jones House =

Historic house in Oregon, United States

- U.S. National Register of Historic Places
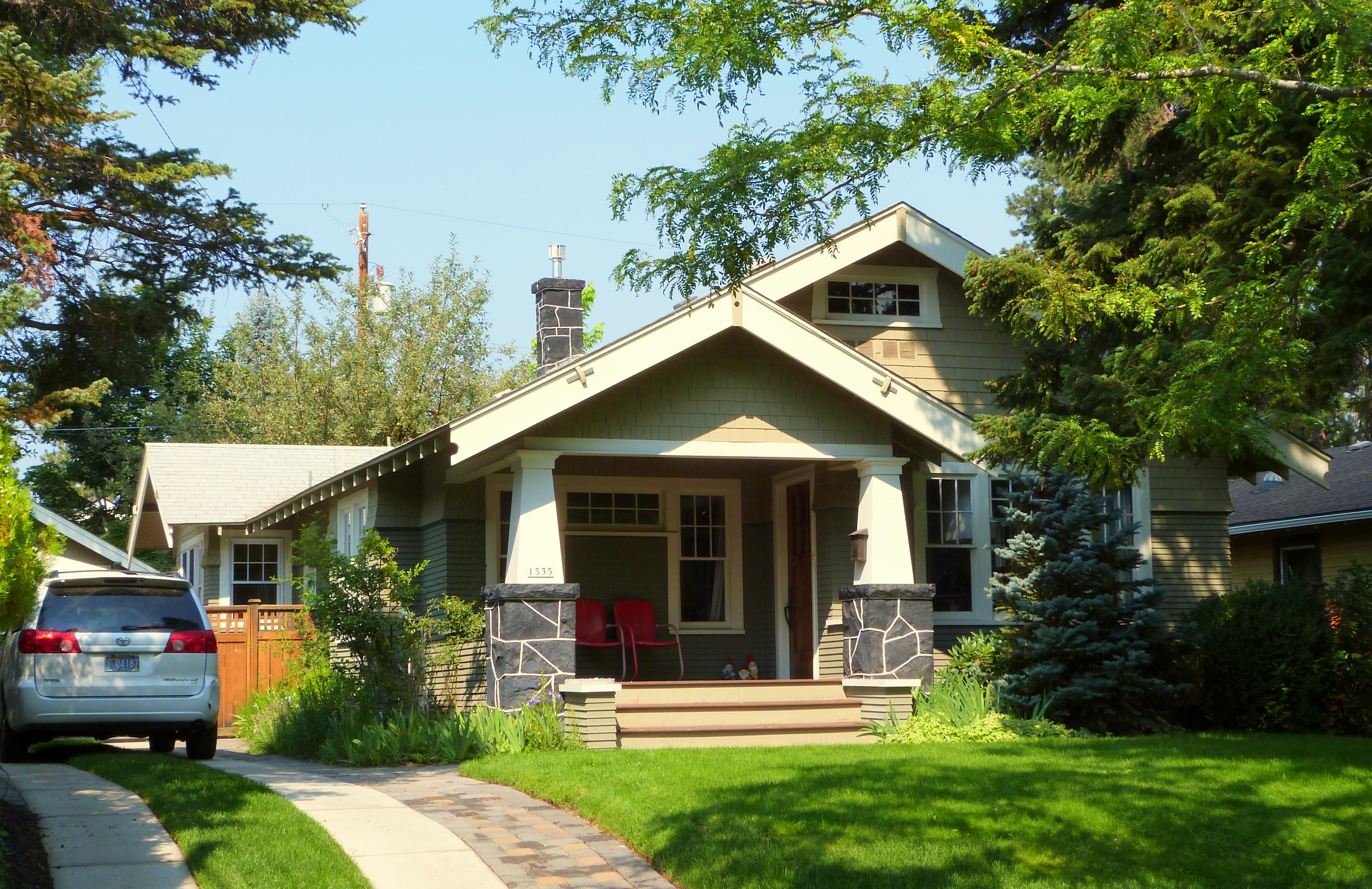
- Simpson E. Jones House in 2013

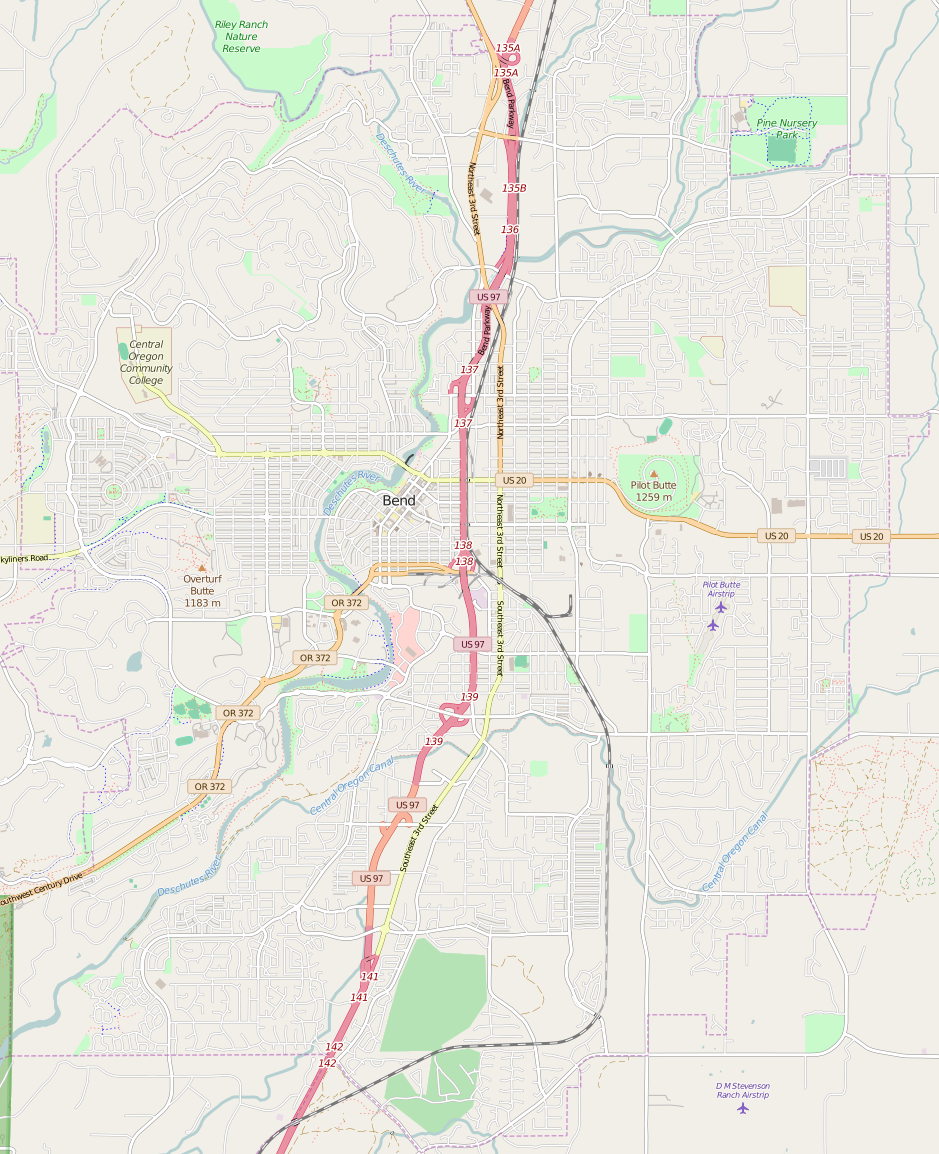
- Location within Bend OR Location within Oregon
- Location: 1535 NW Awbrey Rd., Bend, Oregon
- Coordinates: 44°3′15″N 121°18′55″W
- Area: less than one acre
- Built: 1924
- Architectural style: Bungalow/craftsman
- MPS: Craftsman Bungalows in Deschutes County MPS
- NRHP reference No.: 00000227
- Added to NRHP: March 15, 2000

The Simpson E. Jones House, located in Bend, Oregon, is a house listed on the National Register of Historic Places.

== See also ==
- National Register of Historic Places listings in Deschutes County, Oregon
