= Milton Odem House =

- U.S. National Register of Historic Places
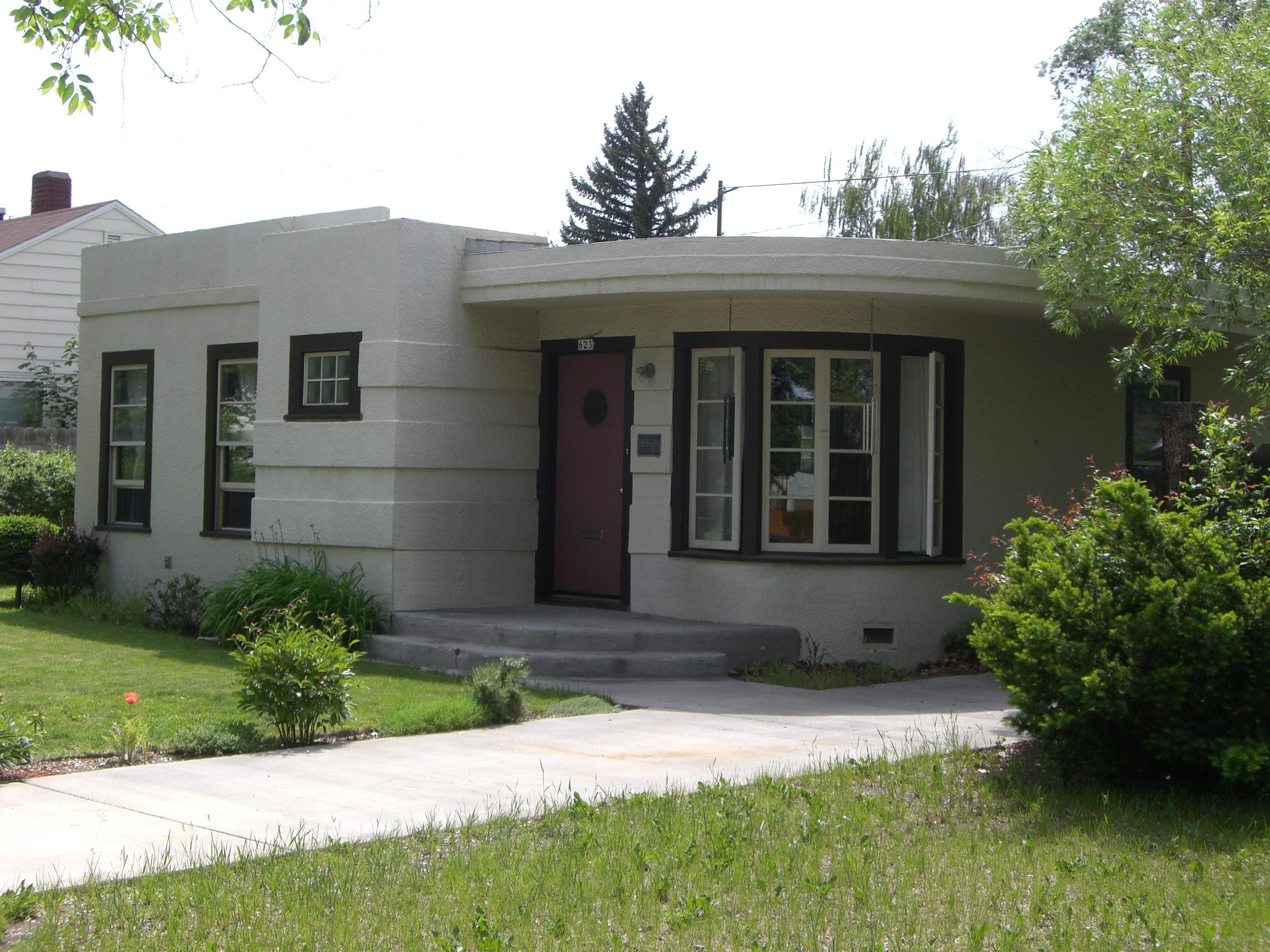
- Streamline Moderne residence

- Location within Oregon Location within the United States
- Interactive map showing the location of Milton Odem House
- Location: Redmond, Oregon, USA
- Coordinates: 44.27113°N 121.18102°W
- Built: 1937-1941
- Architect: Ole K. Olsen (builder)
- Architectural style: Streamline Moderne
- NRHP reference No.: 97000139
- Added to NRHP: 1997

The Milton Odem House is a small bungalow home located in Redmond, Oregon. The house was built in 1937 by Ole K. Olson for Milton Odem, a local theater owner. It is one of the best examples of residential Streamline Moderne architecture in Oregon. The Milton Odem House was listed on the National Register of Historic Places in 1997.

== History ==
Milton Odem was born in Enid, Oklahoma in 1906. He moved to Idaho as a boy, growing up in Grangeville and Lewiston. Odem arrived in Redmond with his wife in 1923. They bought an existing theater and renamed it the Mayfair, turning it into a successful business. Odem later built a second movie theater in downtown in Redmond; and then a drive-in theater on the outskirts of the city. Over the years, he also served on the Redmond Airport Commission, the Redmond City Planning Commission, and the Redmond City Council.

In 1937, Odem decided to build a new theater to accommodate the influx of movie goers from the Civilian Conservation Corps camp at Camp Sherman and workers at the new Redmond Air Field. He called the new theater the Odem. Odem chose a sleek modern design for his new theater, an architectural style known as Streamline Moderne. The style features aerodynamic lines, chromium steel, colored vitreous marble, tubular neon, stucco walls, glass blocks, tinted mirrors, and recessed lighting. All these features combine to create a streamlined industrial look which was very popular at the time, especially for theaters and commercial buildings.

Not only did he build his new Odem theater in that style, he also built a new Streamline Moderne home the same year the theater was constructed. The home was located on a 50 by 100-foot (30 m) lot on the west side of 12th Street in southwest Redmond. The Odem family only lived in the house for three years, moving to another home in the Redmond area in 1940.

In 1940, a back porch was added to the home and a garage was built on the northwest corner of the lot. A year later, the new owners added a second bedroom to the northwest corner of the house. With that addition, today's historic structure was complete. Subsequent alterations changed some of the original characteristics. For example, in the 1970s, the original double-hung windows were replaced by aluminum frame windows. The original doors were also replaced during that period.

A major renovation of the Odem house was completed in the spring of 1996, bringing back much of the original detail using historic photography to guide the work. Because of its unusual Streamline Moderne design, the Milton Odem House was listed on the National Register of Historic Places on 21 February 1997. At the time it was listed, the Milton Odem House was the only Streamline Moderne residential property in Oregon listed on the National Register of Historic Places. Today, the Odem house remain one of the best examples of a Streamline Moderne residence in the state of Oregon.

== Structure ==
Ole Knutte Olson for Milton Odem and his wife, Flossie. It is a small one-story bungalow that measures 26 by 33 feet (10 m). The house is an excellent example of a Streamline Moderne style residence, highlighting many of the style's most notable features. For example, the design features prominent horizontal lines, asymmetrical façade, flat roof, broad overhanging eaves, stucco exterior walls, a large corner window, and Art Deco style hardware inside. There are two historic buildings on the property, the main house and a small garage on the northwest corner of the property

- The main house has a balloon-frame structure on a concrete foundation. The roof is flat with a parapet wall running along the roof edge to conceal the asphalt roof. There is a large overhanging eave on the northeast front and north sides of the building. The exterior is covered with spatter-dashed stucco. The living room picture windows are casement style, set at a 110-degree angle. The remaining windows are a two-over-two double-hung type with horizontal muntins. The original doors were replaced in the 1970s. Unfortunately, there are no photographs of the originals doors so an appropriate Streamline Moderne style door with a round port window was installed during the 1996 renovation. The street front façade has three wide horizontal bands set out from the main wall surface that emphasize the design's horizontal orientation.
- At the northwest corner of the lot, there is a small wood-frame garage and shop building. The garage was built in 1940. It has a shed-roof with asphalt shingles that slopes from front to back. It has 6-inch horizontal clapboard siding and bay doors. There are two windows one on the north side of the building and one on the south side. The garage faces east and was originally connected to 12th Street by a gravel driveway. Today, the gravel lane has been replaced by a concrete driveway. Inside the garage there are two areas, a main space for storing a car and a small tool shop area.

== Interior ==
With only 970 square feet (90 m^{2}) of interior space, the Milton Odem House is designed to be compact and functional. The interior reflect the overall Streamline Moderne design concept. The interior walls are lath and plaster. The living room and dining room floors are covered with 2-inch oak tongue-and-groove decking while the floors in the remaining rooms have 3-inch fir decking.

The living room and adjoining dining room are divided by an archway. The living room measures 10 by 19 feet (5.8 m) and the dining room is 9 by 9. Both rooms have recessed alcove shelve features with arched tops. The dining room also has a built-in five-drawer china cabinet. The front bedroom is 11 by 14 feet (4.3 m) and the adjoining bathroom is 5 by 8 feet (2.4 m). The bathroom has chrome fixtures and a glass block exterior window. In 1996, the kitchen was expanded to incorporate the back porch area. While not part of the original design, the change was necessary to accommodates modern living. The rear bedroom was added in 1941. It measures 13 by 15 feet (4.6 m). It has two large windows on the southwest corner of the room overlooking the back yard and another window on the north side of the room. The house still has its original rose crystal door knobs and brass hardware; however, none of the original lighting fixtures remain.

== See also ==
- National Register of Historic Places listings in Deschutes County, Oregon
