= Downing Building =

- U.S. National Register of Historic Places
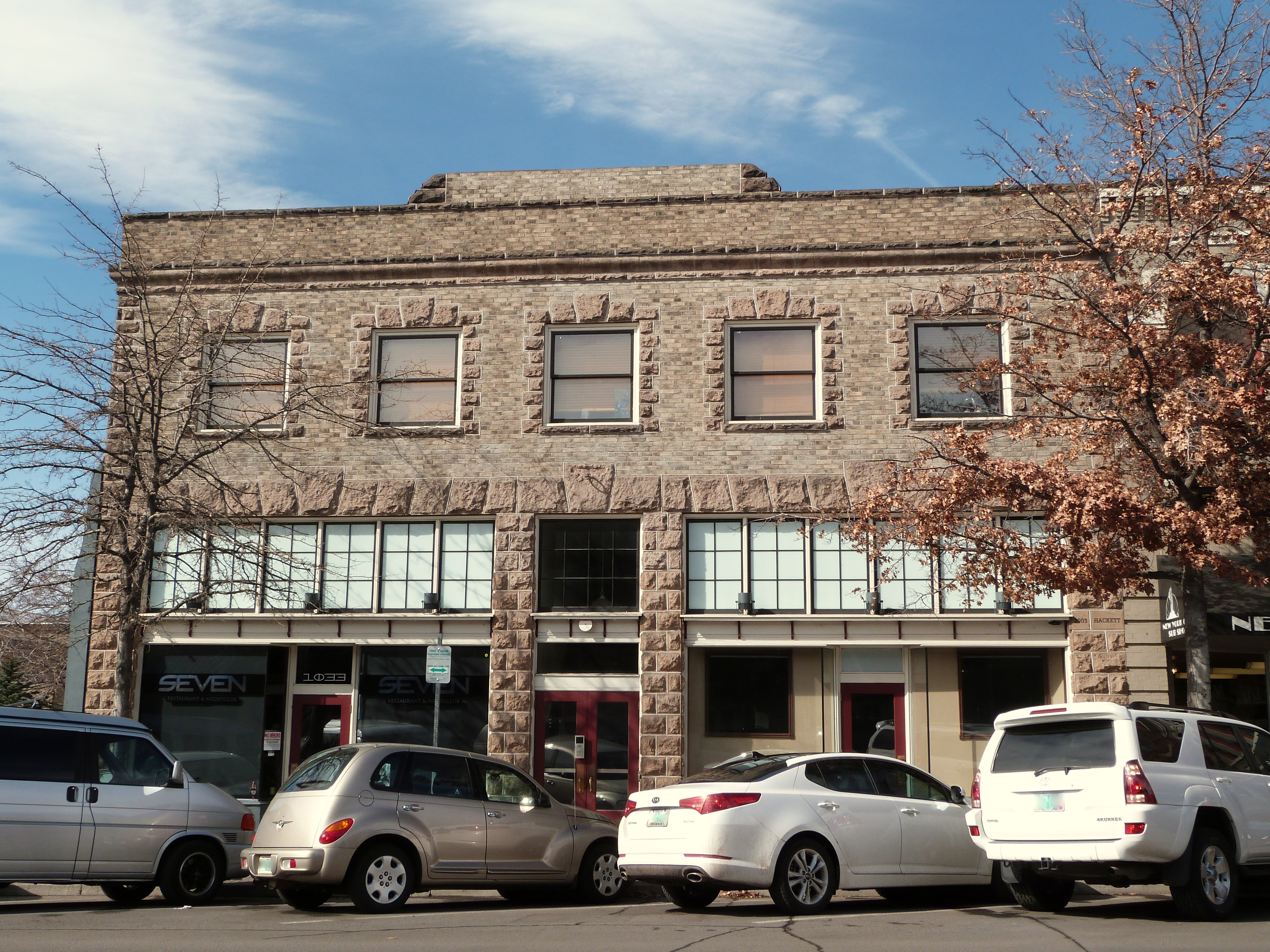
- The Downing Building in 2013
- Location: 1033–1035 NW Bond Street; Bend, Oregon
- Coordinates: 44°03′35″N 121°18′43″W
- Area: Less than 1 acre (0.40 ha)
- Built: 1920
- Architectural style: Commercial style
- Restored: 2003
- NRHP reference No.: 04001262
- Added to NRHP: November 26, 2004

The Downing Building is a historic commercial building in downtown Bend, Oregon, United States. It was built in 1920 by local stage driver and restaurateur William P. Downing.

The building was listed on the National Register of Historic Places in 2004.

It housed The Bus Depot during the 1980s.

== See also ==
- National Register of Historic Places listings in Deschutes County, Oregon
