= Elk Lake Guard Station =

- U.S. National Register of Historic Places
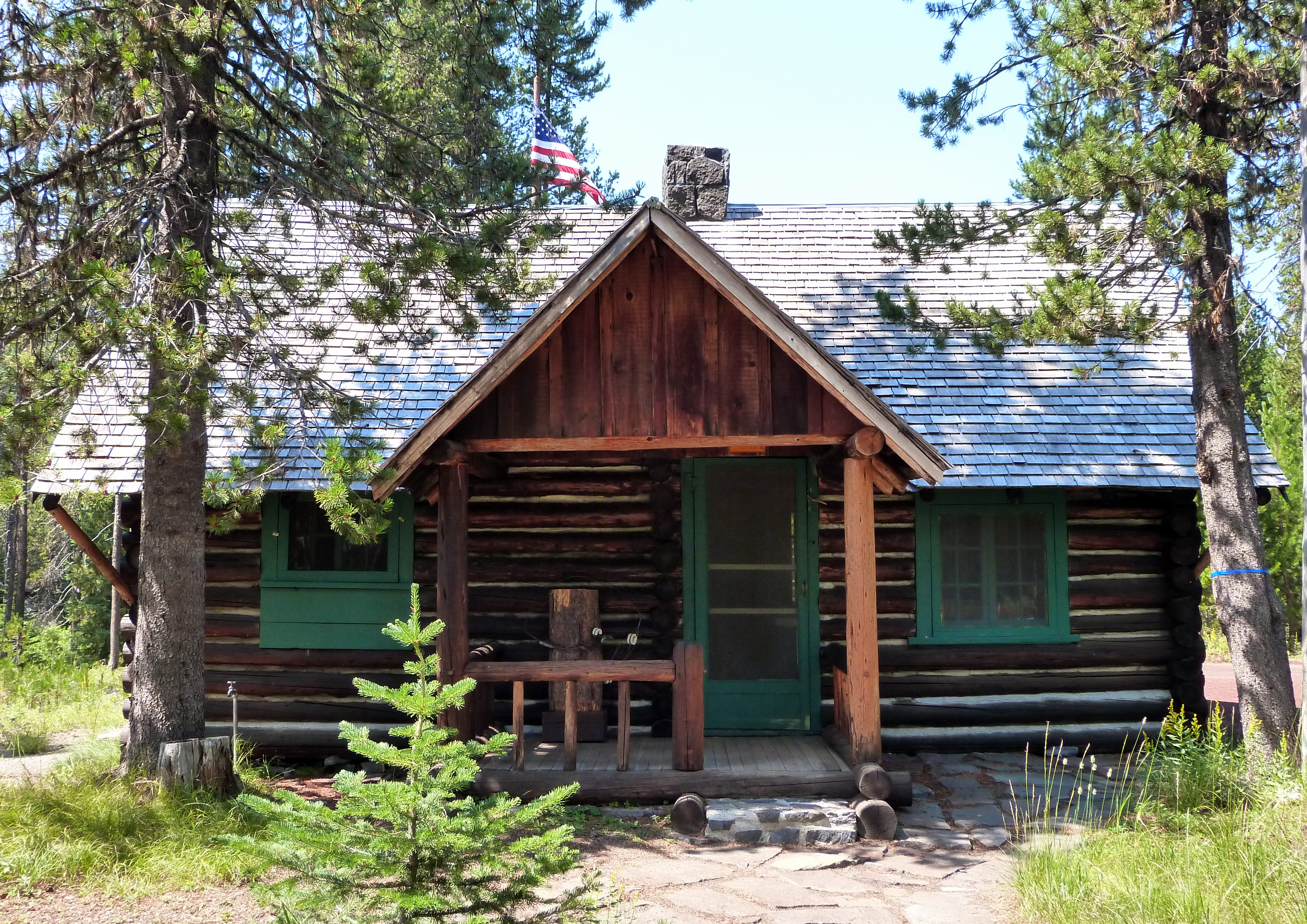
- East façade of Elk Lake Guard Station cabin

- Location within Oregon Location within the United States
- Location: Deschutes National Forest
- Nearest city: Bend, Oregon, US
- Coordinates: 43.98287°N 121.80661°W
- Built: 1929
- Architectural style: Simple rustic
- NRHP reference No.: 09000240
- Added to NRHP: 23 April 2009

The Elk Lake Guard Station is a United States Forest Service cabin located in the Deschutes National Forest southwest of Bend, Oregon. The guard station was built in 1929 on the north shore of Elk Lake. It was used as a home base for Forest Service personnel who protected forest resources, maintained facilities, and aided summer visitors in the Cascade Lakes area of Central Oregon. After decades of use, the cabin was renovated in the late 1990s. Today, the historic guard station serves as a Forest Service visitor information center along the Cascade Lakes Scenic Byway. The Elk Lake Guard Station is listed on the National Register of Historic Places.

== Location ==
Elk Lake Guard Station is located in the eastern foothills of the Cascade Range in central Oregon. It is 32 miles (51 km) southwest of Bend. The guard station is just off Forest Road 46, also known as the Cascade Lakes National Scenic Byway. The compound is situated between the east side of the highway and the northwest shore of the Elk Lake. The site is at an elevation of 4,921 feet (1,500 m) above sea level. The area around the guard station is a coniferous forest dominated by lodgepole pine.

== History ==
The Cascade Lakes area of central Oregon became part of the Cascade Range Forest Reserve in 1893. In 1905, these public lands were transferred to the newly formed United States Forest Service. In 1906, Elk Lake was named by Roy Harvey, a Forest Service ranger. The Elk Lake area became part of the Deschutes National Forest in 1908. A primitive road was built from Bend to Elk Lake in 1920. The road helped make Elk Lake a popular recreation site where summer visitors enjoyed boating, fishing, and swimming. To accommodate the growing number of visitors, Elk Lake Lodge was built in 1922. Two years later, a post office was opened at Elk Lake.

Since the land around Elk Lake was administered by the Forest Service, the growing number of visitors required the rangers in Bend to spend more time in the area. To support this presence, the Elk Lake Guard Station was built in 1929. Initially, the guard station was staffed on a transient basis whenever a ranger from the Bend District office was in the area. In 1935, the Forest Service moved the ranger cabin approximately 300 feet (91 m) from the edge of the lake to a sheltered area close to the road. Beginning in the late 1930s, the guard station was staffed full-time during the summer by a Forest Service guard. The guard protected forest resources, maintained local facilities, and assisted summer visitors. The Forest Service continued to staff the guard station into the 1990s.

In 1997, the Forest Service decided to turn the historic Elk Lake Guard Station into an information center for visitors traveling along the Cascade Lakes National Scenic Byway. At the same time, the Forest Service began a series of renovation projects to restore the historic character of the guard station. The repair and rehabilitation work was accomplished by Forest Service employees and volunteers over a period of five summers. The restoration included foundation work, resealing of walls, and repairs to the porch, doors, windows, and chimney. The linoleum floor covering was removed to reveal the original wooden floor, and the cabin's old cedar shingles were replaced with new ones. The guard station was rededicated in a ceremony on 25 August 2001.

Because the Elk Lake Guard Station is a well-preserved example of an early Forest Service guard station, the ranger cabin at the site was listed on the National Register of Historic Places on 23 April 2009. Today, the historic guard station is open during the summer months, serving as a Forest Service visitor information center. It is staffed by volunteer history interpretation/information specialists who serve as uniformed Forest Service representatives at the site.

== Structures ==
The historic Elk Lake Guard Station site covers approximately 2 acres (0.81 ha). There are four structures at the Elk Lake Guard Station. However, only the ranger cabin has historic value. The other three non-historic structures support on-going operations at the visitor information center. The structures include a combined ranger residence and office, a utility shed, a pump house, and an outhouse with a vault toilet. Each building has a different design based on its function and the period in which it was constructed. As a result of the renovation that was completed in 2001, the historic cabin is in excellent condition.

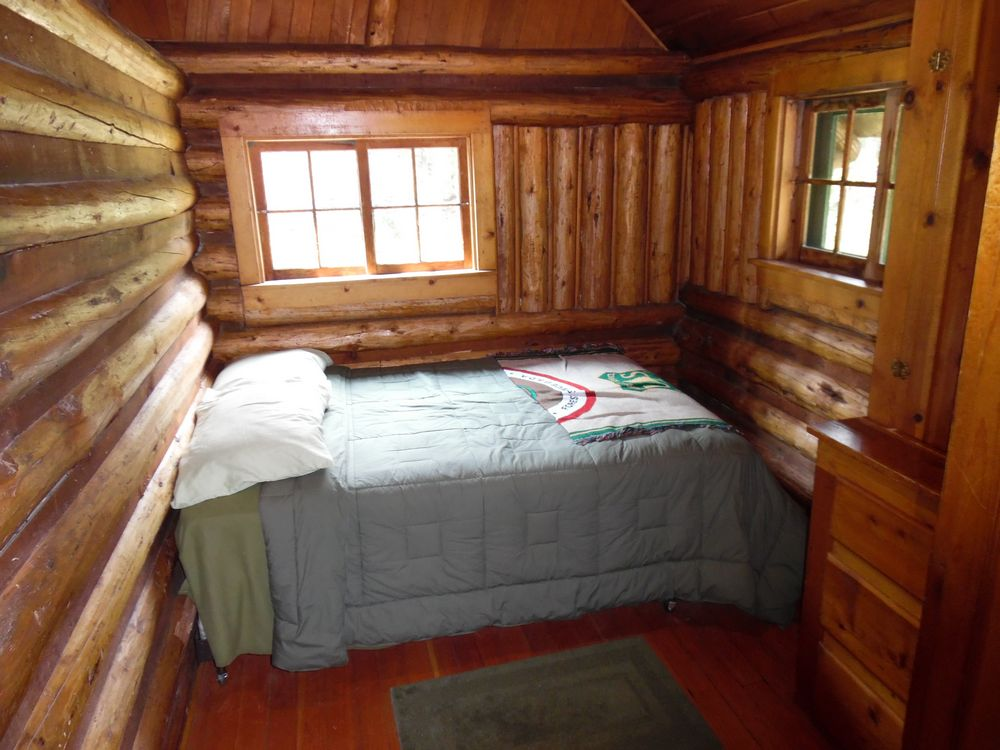
Bedroom in the historic guard station cabin

The ranger cabin is a one-story stacked-log structure on a concrete-pier foundation with a gable roof. The cabin's footprint measures 17 by 24 feet (5.2 m × 7.3 m), providing approximately 400 square feet (37 m^{2}) of interior space. The structure is constructed of 8-inch (20 cm) diameter peeled logs with mortar chinking packed between the logs. The logs are stacked horizontally and secured at the corners in saddle notches except at the southwest corner, where the upper tier logs are placed vertically. The upper part of the gable ends are covered with horizontal board-and-batten. The cabin's stone chimney is in the center of the roof. The front and back porches are 4.5 by 6.5 feet (1.4 m × 2.0 m), supported by log posts. All the doors and exterior window frames are painted green. The rest of the building is unpainted.

The interior of the cabin is partitioned into three rooms. The interior petitions are made of peeled stacked logs with mortar chinking between logs. The front room (office) is at north end of building. The bedroom takes up the southwest quarter and the kitchen is in the southeast quarter. A steel cable connects the two long walls to keep the winter snow load from forcing the sides of the cabin apart. The floor is covered with 4-inch (10 cm) tongue-and-groove fir planks. The cabin has three doors: a front door facing west, a back door facing east, and a kitchen door facing south. The office has two casement windows. The bedroom and kitchen each have two horizontal sliding sash windows. The kitchen has built-in knotty pine cupboards and the bedroom has a built-in knotty pine dresser. The bedroom also has a built-in closet with knotty pine doors. The ceiling is covered with 4-inch (10 cm)-wide tongue-and-groove fir boards.

There is a utility shed next to the ranger cabin. It was built in 1979. The building is 18 by 10 feet (5.5 m × 3.0 m) with a side gable roof. The exterior is covered with pine board-and-batten siding. The shed has two horizontal sliding-glass windows on east and west sides. The interior has a drywall finish. The building houses a shower, refrigerator, washing machine, and clothes dryer.

The pump house was built in 2005. It houses the guard station's water pump. The building is a wood-frame structure with a gabled roof. It has a 6-by-10-foot (1.8 m × 3.0 m) footprint with only one door, located on the south side of the building.

The guard station's outhouse was built sometime before 1970. It has a vault toilet. The structure has a wood-frame with tongue-and-groove siding and a gable roof. The building's footprint is 4.5 by 5.5 feet (1.4 m × 1.7 m).

== See also ==
- National Register of Historic Places listings in Deschutes County, Oregon
