= New Taggart Hotel =

- U.S. National Register of Historic Places
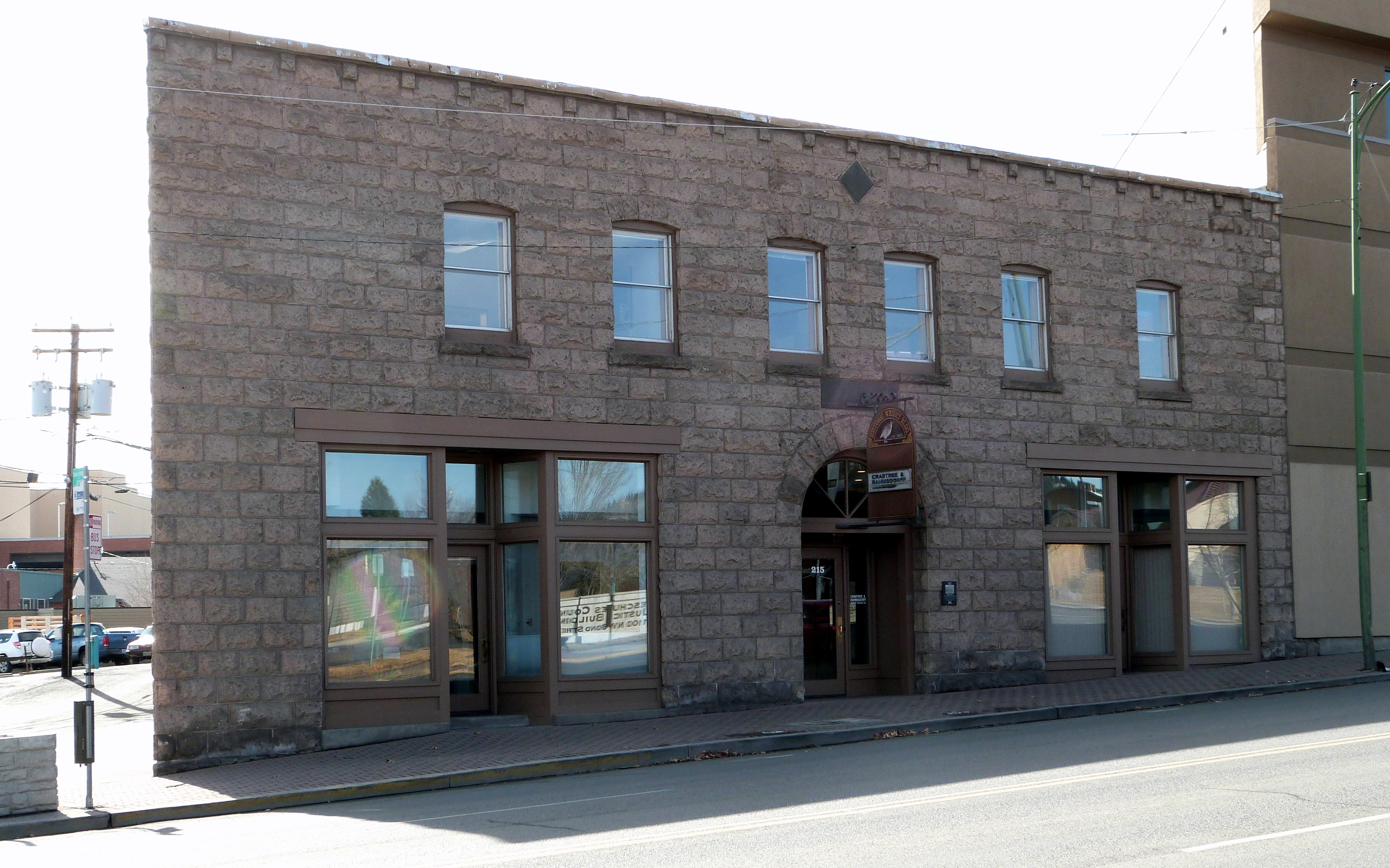
- The building's exterior in 2013

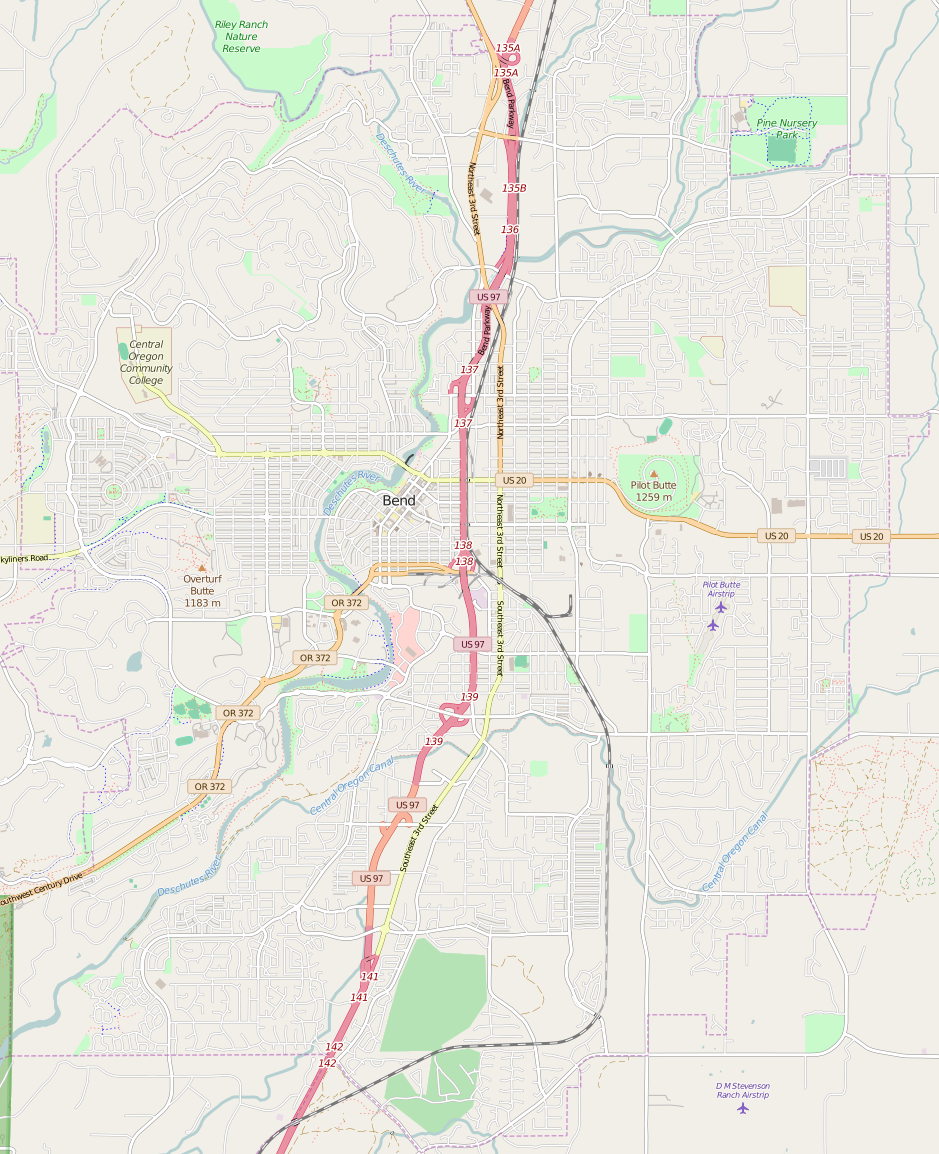
- Location within Bend OR Location within Oregon Location within the United States
- Location: 215 NW Greenwood Avenue, Bend, Oregon, U.S.
- Coordinates: 44°3′36″N 121°18′33″W
- Area: less than one acre
- Built: 1911
- Architect: Goodrich, J.B.
- Architectural style: Chicago, Commercial Style
- NRHP reference No.: 88000087
- Added to NRHP: February 29, 1988

The New Taggart Hotel, located in Bend, Oregon, is listed on the National Register of Historic Places.

== See also ==
- National Register of Historic Places listings in Deschutes County, Oregon
