= Skylines =

Skylines may refer to:

- Skylines (film), a 2020 American science fiction action film
- Skylines (TV series), a 2019 German television drama series
- Cities: Skylines, a 2015 city-building video game
  - Cities: Skylines II, a 2023 city-building video game

== See also ==
- Skyline (disambiguation)
- Skyliner (disambiguation)
- Skyliners (disambiguation)
