= Trinity Episcopal Church (Bend, Oregon) =

Historic church in Oregon, United States

- U.S. National Register of Historic Places
- U.S. Historic district – Contributing property
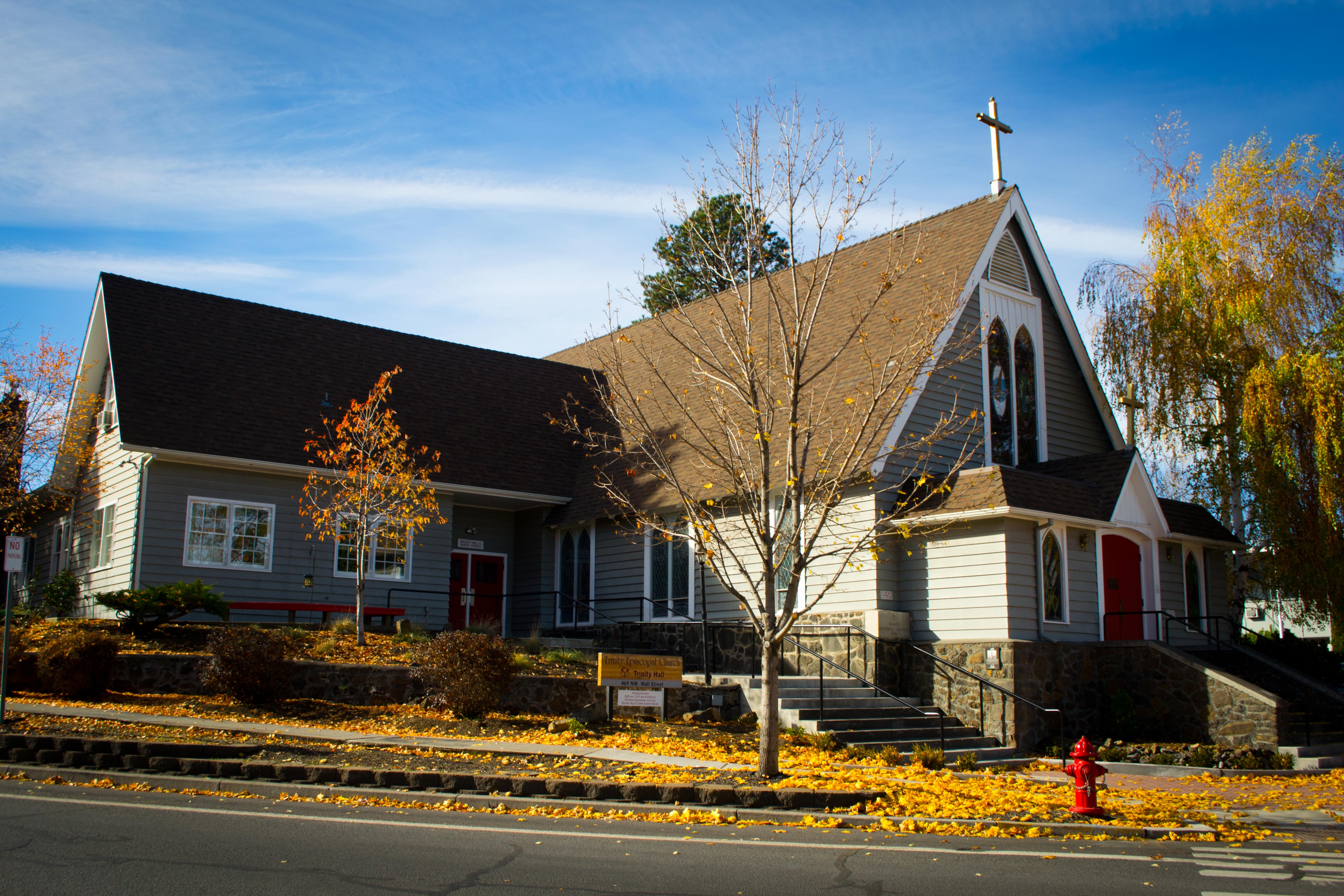
- Trinity Episcopal Church in 2012.

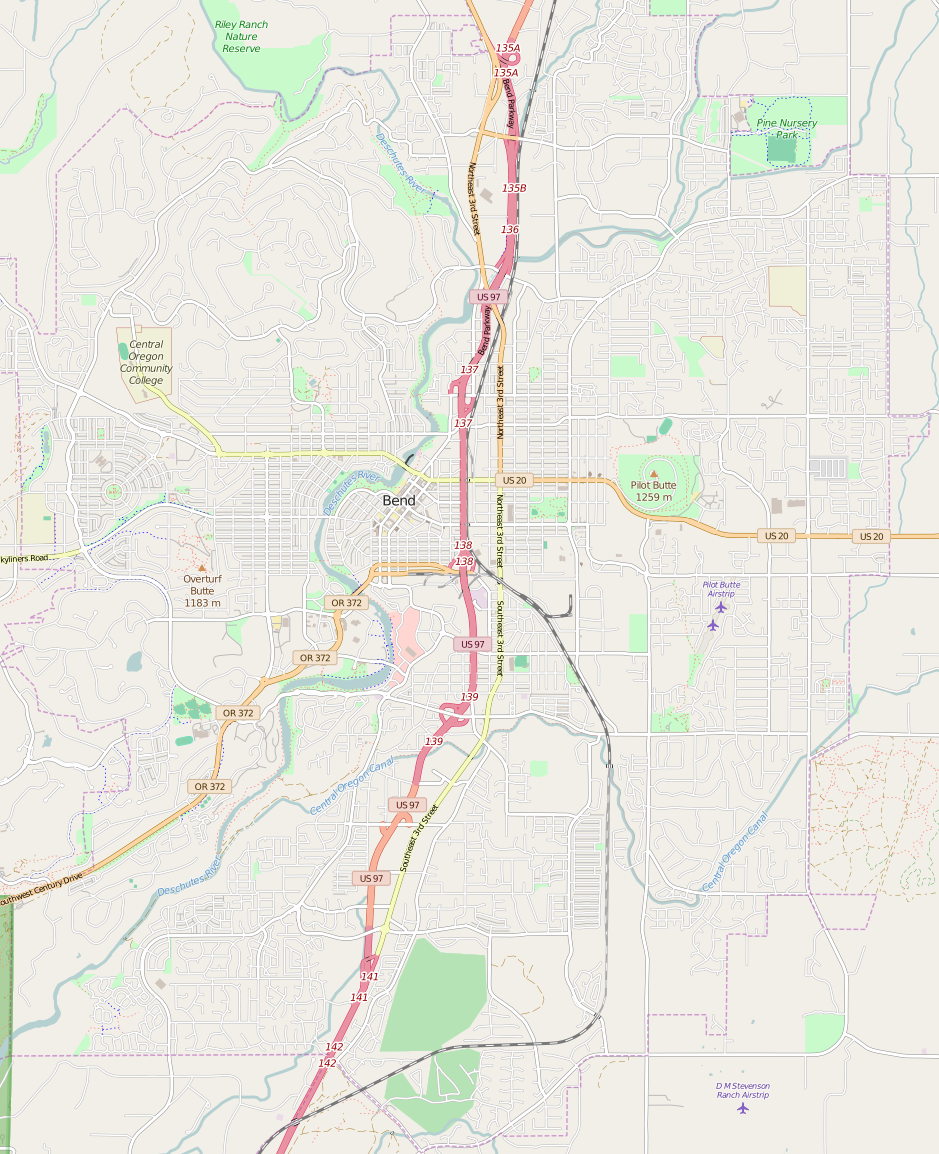
- Location within Bend OR Location within Oregon
- Location: 469 NW Wall Street; Bend, Oregon
- Coordinates: 44°03′20″N 121°19′05″W
- Area: 0.3 acres (0.12 ha)
- Built: 1929
- Architect: Multiple
- Architectural style: Late Gothic Revival
- Part of: Old Town Historic District (ID01000681)
- MPS: Historic Development of the Bend Company in Bend, Oregon MPS
- NRHP reference No.: 93000915
- Added to NRHP: September 23, 1993

Trinity Episcopal Church is an Episcopal congregation and a historic wooden Gothic Revival style building in Bend, Oregon, United States. It is listed on the National Register of Historic Places.

== See also ==
- National Register of Historic Places listings in Deschutes County, Oregon
