= Emil and Ottilie Wienecke House =

Historic house in Oregon, United States

- U.S. National Register of Historic Places
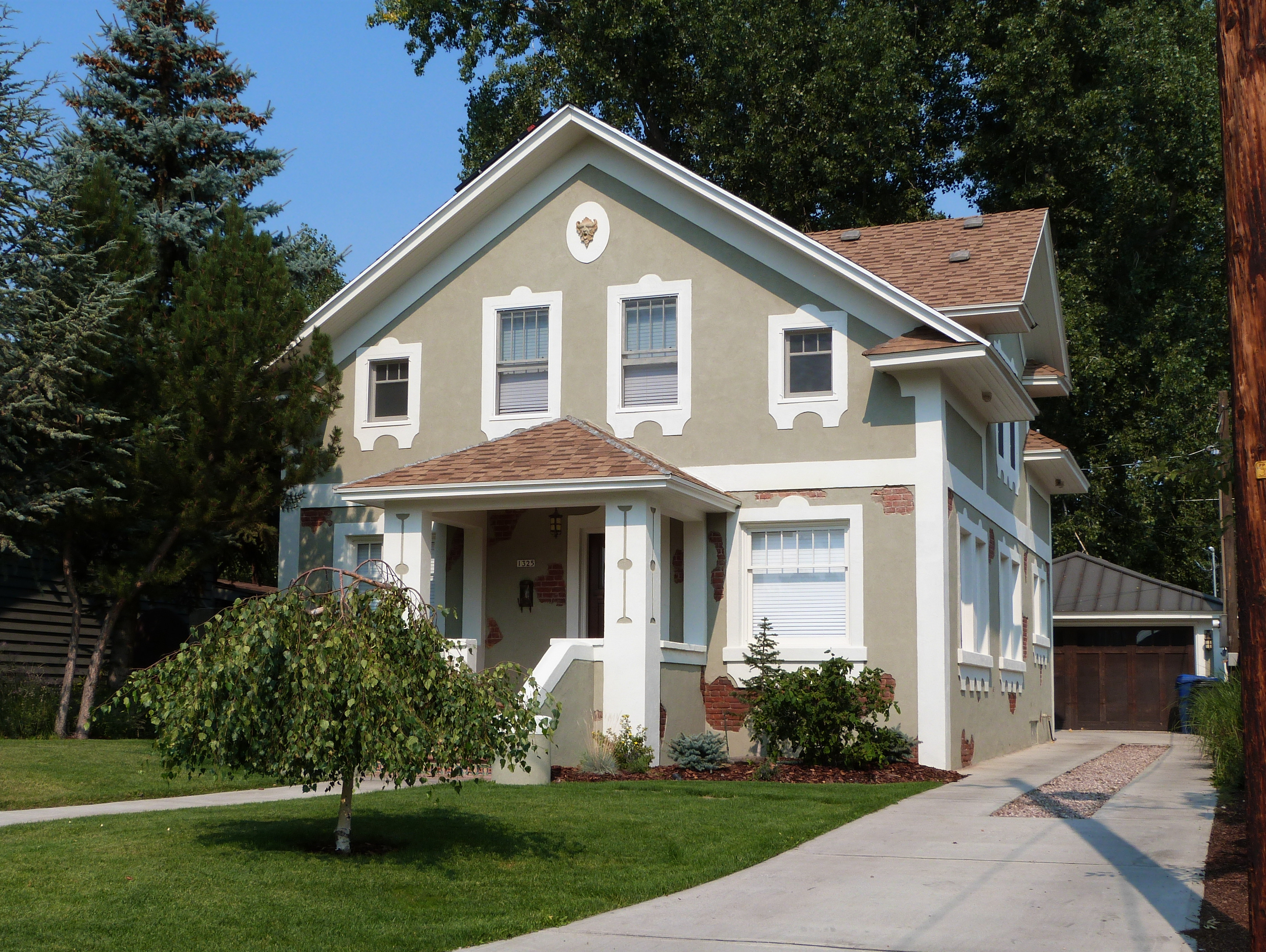

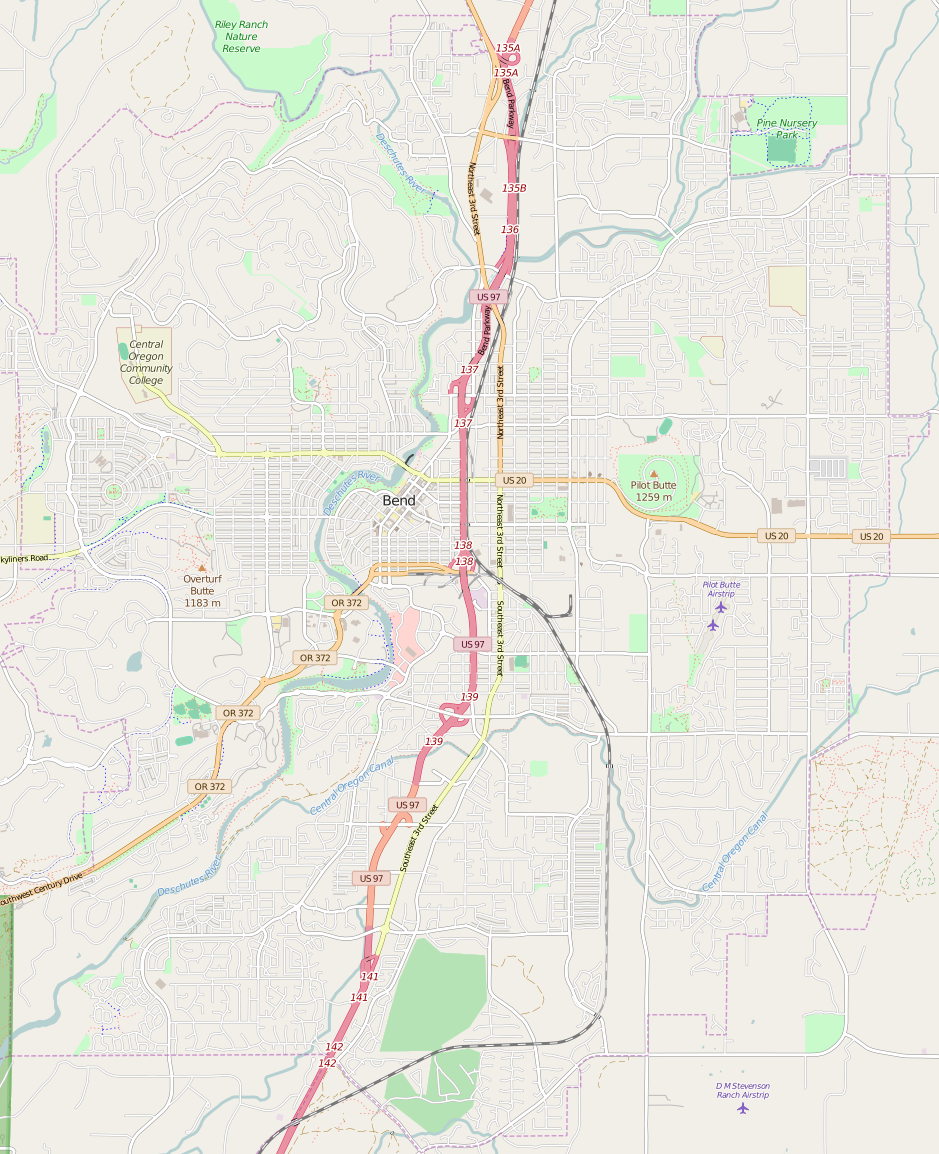
- Location within Bend OR Location within Oregon
- Location: 1325 NW. Federal St., Bend, Oregon
- Coordinates: 44°3′42″N 121°19′26″W
- Area: 0.1 acres (0.040 ha)
- Built: 1924
- Built by: Emil Wienecke
- Architect: Emil Wienecke
- Architectural style: Late 19th And 20th Century Revivals, Late 19th And Early 20th Century American Movements
- NRHP reference No.: 08000472
- Added to NRHP: May 29, 2008

The Emil and Ottilie Wienecke House is a historic house located at 1325 NW. Federal Street in Bend, Oregon. It was completed in 1924 and was listed on the National Register of Historic Places on May 29, 2008.

== See also ==
- National Register of Historic Places listings in Deschutes County, Oregon
