= Evan Andreas Sather House =

Historic house in Oregon, United States

- U.S. National Register of Historic Places
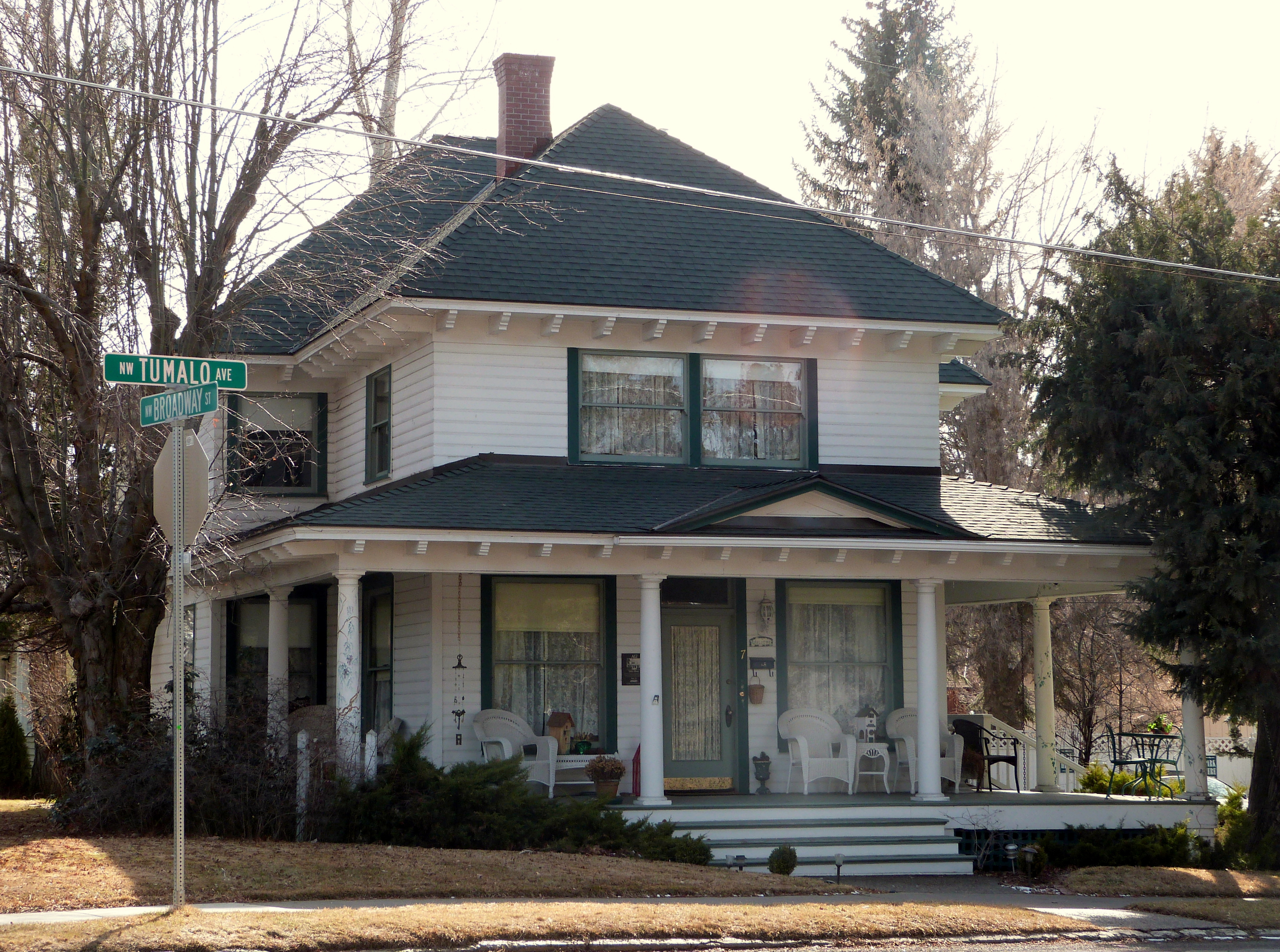

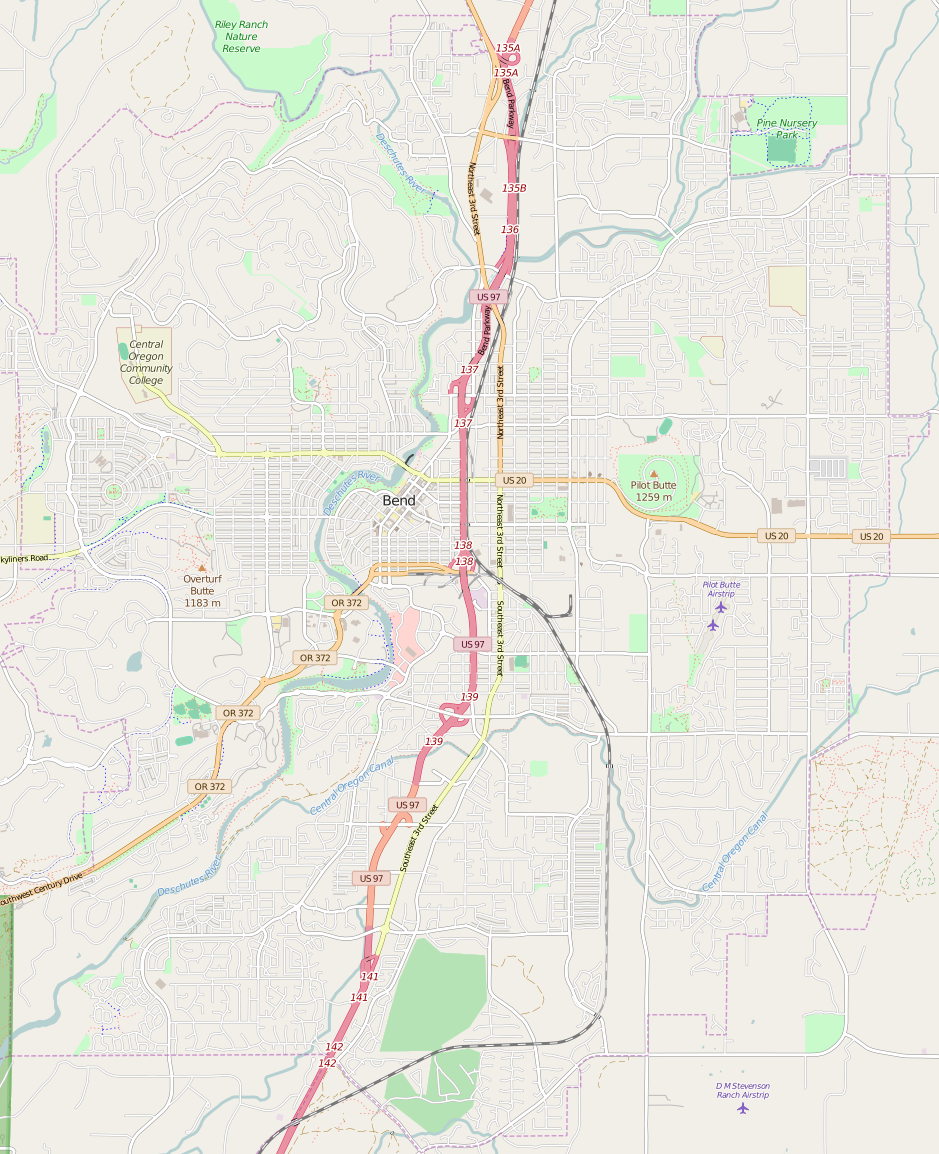
- Location within Bend OR Location within Oregon
- Location: 7 NW Tumalo Avenue, Bend, Oregon
- Coordinates: 44°3′22″N 121°19′4″W
- Area: 0.19 acres (0.077 ha)
- Built: 1911
- Architect: W. P. Smith
- Architectural style: Bungalow/Craftsman
- NRHP reference No.: 97000577
- Added to NRHP: June 27, 1997

The Evan Andreas Sather House is a historic house located at 7 NW Tumalo Avenue in Bend, Oregon. It is locally significant for its high artistic value and for its distinctive characteristics of the Craftsman style.

== Description and history ==
The two-story, single-family house was completed in 1911 in the American Craftsman style. The 31' x 40' plan sits on a stone foundation of native ‘Tuff’ rock, most likely quarried on site. Excavation and stone work was completed by H. Caler. It was constructed using standard balloon-frame construction and is clad with six-inch, horizontal, tongue and groove, drop siding.

It was listed on the National Register of Historic Places on June 27, 1997.

== See also ==
- National Register of Historic Places listings in Deschutes County, Oregon
