= Goodwillie–Allen House =

Historic house in Oregon, United States

- U.S. National Register of Historic Places
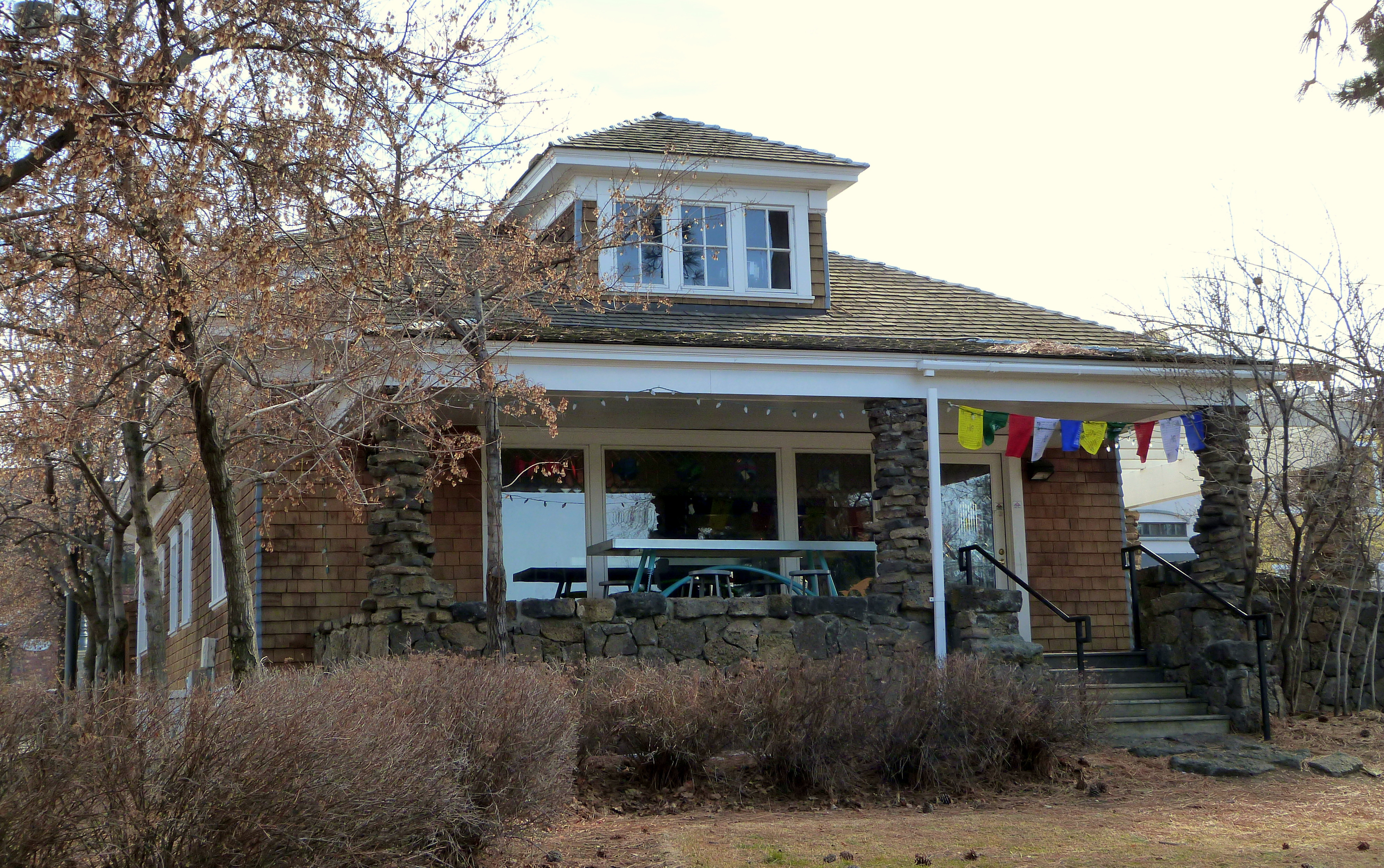
- Historic craftsman bungalow

- Location within Oregon Location within the United States
- Interactive map showing the location of Goodwillie-Allen House
- Location: 875 Northwest Brooks Street, Bend, Oregon, US
- Coordinates: 44.059419°N 121.315041°W
- Built: 1904
- Architectural style: American Craftsman
- NRHP reference No.: 07000493
- Added to NRHP: 2007

The Goodwillie–Allen House (also known as the Goodwillie House, H. E. Allen House, Allen-Rademacher House, and Goodwillie-Allen-Rademacher House) is a small American Craftsman-style bungalow located in Bend, Oregon. The house was constructed in 1904 by Arthur Goodwillie, the first mayor of Bend. Today, the building is owned by the City of Bend. It is the oldest structure inside the city limits of Bend, the oldest American craftsman style house in Deschutes County, Oregon, and the second oldest craftsman-style bungalow in Oregon. The Goodwillie–Allen House was added to the National Register of Historic Places in 2007.

== History ==
Arthur L. Goodwillie was born in Chicago, Illinois in 1878. He moved to Bend in 1904 to explore business opportunities in Central Oregon. Goodwillie became a partner in the Pilot Butte Development Company, serving as the company's secretary. He was an investor in the town's first bank and its first telephone company. He helped organize Bend's first water, power and light utilities. Goodwillie also helped establish the area's first school district, serving on its board of directors. In December 1904, Goodwillie was elected Bend's first mayor.

Shortly after arriving in Bend, Goodwillie married Grace Jones, a local school teacher. After their marriage, the Goodwillies built a new home overlooking the Deschutes River. It was a small bungalow constructed in the American craftsman style. They lived in the home from its completion in 1904 until late 1907, when they moved back to Chicago.

The Goodwillies sold the house to Herbert and Alice Allen, a young couple who had just arrived in Bend. Herbert Allen was a senior manager with the Brooks-Scanlon Lumber Company, a firm that operated a large sawmill in Bend. He was also active in a wide range of other private enterprises including the Central Oregon Irrigation Company and the Deschutes Irrigation and Power Company as well as many civic and public affairs organizations such as the Bend Commercial Club, the local chamber of commerce, and the Bend school district. The Allens lived in the bungalow from 1908 until Herbert's death in October 1929.

A local physician, Doctor Clyde Rademacher, and his wife Marjorie were the next owners of the house. The Rademachers bought the property from the Allens in 1937. Doctor Rademacher was a founder of the Bend Memorial Clinic, the community's first multi-specialty medical clinic. The Rademachers lived in the house until the 1980s when both the doctor and his wife died just a few years apart.

After the death of the Rademachers, the property sat vacant for several years. Eventually, the building was scheduled for demolition to create space for a parking lot. However, a community group was organized in 1993 to save the historic residence. The plan, called the Riverfront Connection Project, was to acquire the building and move it 50 feet (15 m) south of its original site onto an adjacent tax lot. This was done successfully, without any damage to the structure. Once the building was on its new foundation, it was renovated for use as a fine art gallery and art education center. In 2012, the art gallery vacated the property. The City of Bend then leased the building to a new tenant for use as a café and bicycle rental shop.

Today, the bungalow is the oldest building in the city of Bend and the oldest American craftsman-style residence in Deschutes County. It is also the second oldest craftsman-style bungalow in the state of Oregon. Over the course of its existence, the house has been known by various names. Initially, it was known as the Goodwillie House, then the H. E. Allen House, later the Allen-Rademacher House, and finally the Goodwillie-Allen-Rademacher House. When the property was nominated for listing on the National Register of Historic Places in 2007, it was nominated as the Goodwillie-Allen House. However, it is most commonly known as the Goodwillie-Allen-Rademacher House to recognize the bungalow's three principal owners.

== Structure ==
The Goodwillie–Allen House is a one-and-one-half-story American craftsman style bungalow. It was built in 1904 at a cost of $1,800. It was constructed with locally produced lumber and native stone. The main part of the house is 28 feet (8.5 m) wide and 54 feet (16 m) long with an extension on the east façade. The extension adds 12 feet (3.7 m) to the length of the house on the southeast side and is half the width of the building. There is also a porch on the west façade that adds an additional 8 feet (2.4 m) to the structure's length. The house is an excellent example of an American craftsman style residence, highlighting many of the style's most notable features. For example, it has a low-pitch hip roof with dormers, deeply overhanging eaves with exposed rafters under the eaves, a large front porch tucked under an extension of the main roof, and numerous windows, many with art glass features.

The front (west) façade has a wide porch with heavy lava stone walls surrounding the porch area. The porch is covered by an extension of the main hip roof. The porch roof is supported by three stone columns. The front door has a large leaded-glass panel and is set to one side of the building's center line. Next to the door are three large picture windows that look out across Drake Park at the Deschutes River. The windows are separated by wide mullions and topped with a single matching header. All three windows feature lead glass detailing in a diamond-obelisk design. Above and set back from the porch roof extension is a large second-floor dormer with a hip roof which caps the west façade.

The south elevation is dominated by a side porch covered by an open lattice beam pergola which runs the entire length of the building. The front of the side porch is bordered by a lava stone wall that matches the front porch. The lattice beams are supported by seven lava stone columns. Starting near the southwestern corner, there are double casement windows bordered by wood-molding frames. The windows are separated by wide mullions with a header sill above. Next to the window group, there is a single wooden door that has been sealed closed. Then there is group of six bay windows. The main side entrance is a wooden door with a large glass panel insert. The door is flanked on both sides by five-pane sidelight windows in wooden frames. East of the entrance are three casement windows with diamond-obelisk art glass in wooden frames. A second floor dormer is centered in the middle of the south façade.

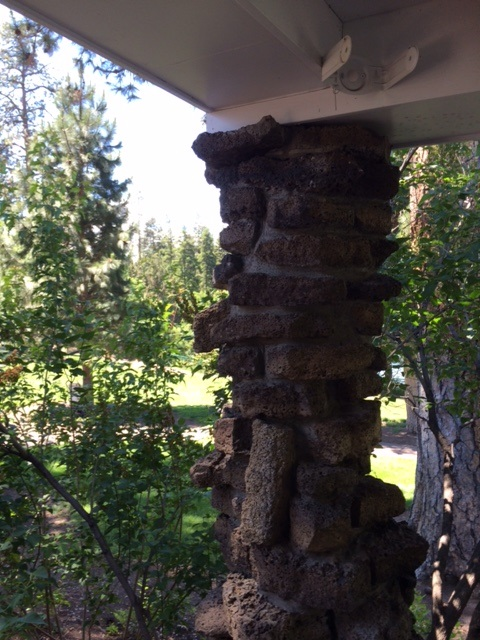
Stone porch post

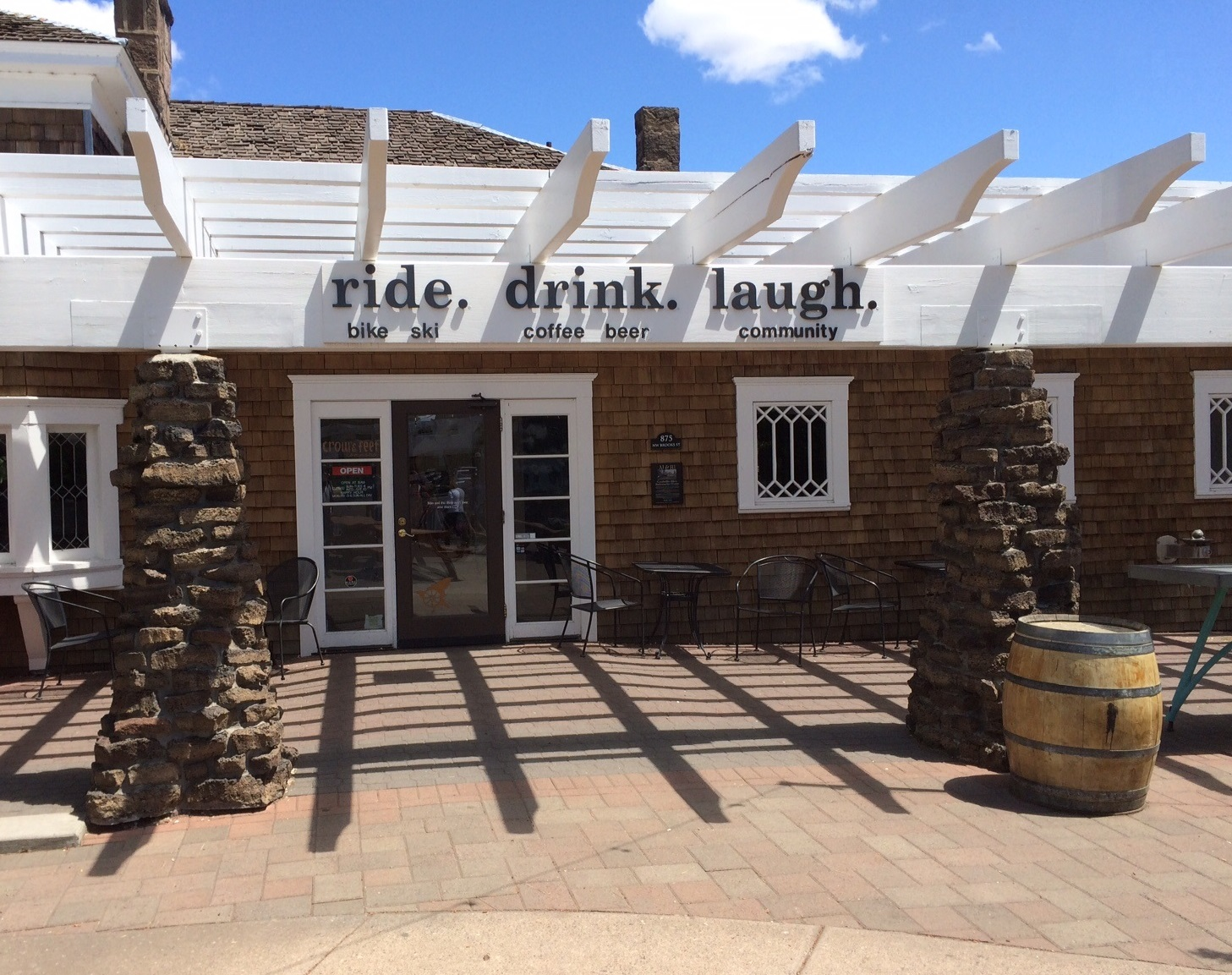
South pergola

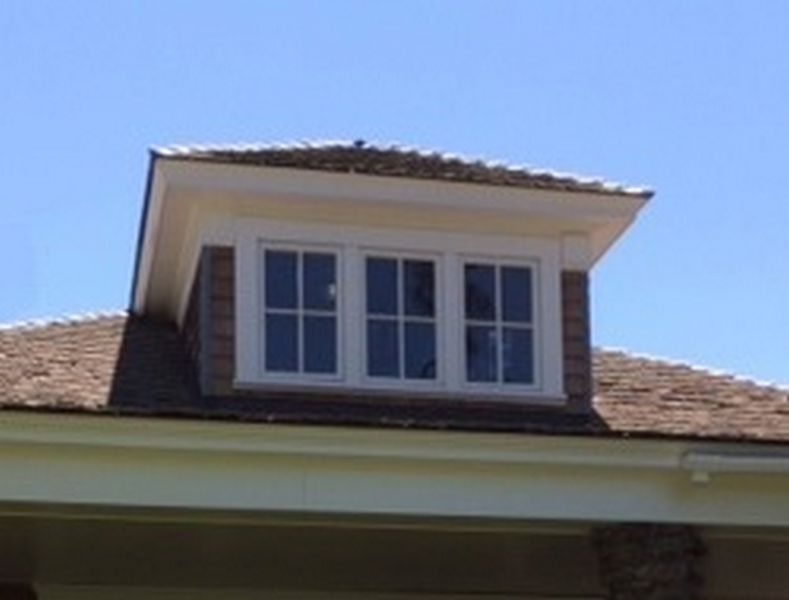
Front dormer

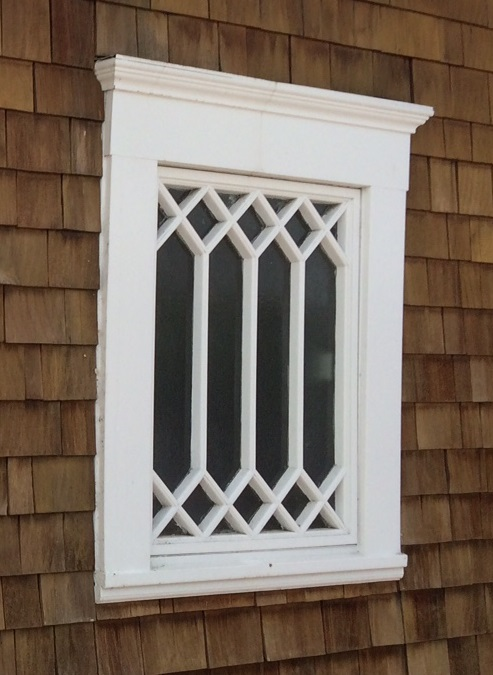
Window design

At the rear of the building (east façade) is the extended section of the house along the south side. The extension is half the width of the building. There are two small square windows on the main part of the building and a sealed wooden door on the north side of the extension. There is a small shed dormer in the center of the roof. Next to the rear dormer is a chimney. A small garden area is located between the rear of the building and the public sidewalk.

First-floor windows run along the northwest side of the building. All the windows feature leaded glass with diamond-obelisk patterns. The windows are separated by wide mullions and topped with matching headers. In the middle of the façade are three single casement windows about 1.5 feet (0.46 m) apart, all with matching window frames. At the northeast corner, there is an alcove area created by the south side extension. On the second floor, there is a large dormer with a hip roof that matches the dormer on the south side of the building.

== Interior ==
The interior of the Goodwillie–Allen House reflects American craftsman design concepts. It has 2,471 square feet (229.6 m^{2}) of interior space with 1,792 square feet (166.5 m^{2}) on the first floor and 779 square feet (72.4 m^{2}) on the second floor.

Most of the first floor has 9.5 feet (2.9 m) ceilings. The living room runs the entire width of the west side (front) of the building. The living room is spacious and bright, with large windows on three sides. The room's main feature is a massive lava stone fireplace in the center of the room, facing the front picture windows. The fireplace features "a high mantel and a low hearth". The mantel is a single thick piece of smooth stone projecting out from the chimney. This fireplace is Deschutes County's oldest known example of native volcanic tuff stone used as residential building material.

Originally, the main dining room was east of the living room on the south side of the building with a bedroom on the north side, opposite the dining room. Today, the dining room is still in its original place, but the front bedroom and another room in the rear have been removed to create a completely open floor plan along the north side of the building. Originally, the kitchen was on the south side of the building next to the dining room, with the side door providing access to the south side porch area. Today, the kitchen has been converted into a foyer for the south side entrance. The small modern kitchen and bathrooms are now in the rear of the building. In these rear rooms the ceiling drops to 8 feet (2.4 m). The stairway to the second floor and several small stage rooms are located in the center of the building toward the rear.

The second floor has a cruciform floor plan under a 7 feet (2.1 m) vaulted ceiling. Today, the second floor provides space for three small offices with stairway access, a restroom, and storage area under the shed dormer at the rear of the building. The dormer windows on the west, south, and north sides of the building provide natural light to the office spaces, although the western and southern offices are in separate rooms. There are built-in shelves and storage cabinets throughout the second floor area, typical of the American craftsman style architecture.

The building has an unfinished basement with approximately 5 feet (1.5 m) of clearance. The basement is used for general storage. It is accessed through a hatch in the front porch deck.

== See also ==
- National Register of Historic Places listings in Deschutes County, Oregon
- American Craftsman
