= Bend Skyliners Lodge =

- U.S. National Register of Historic Places
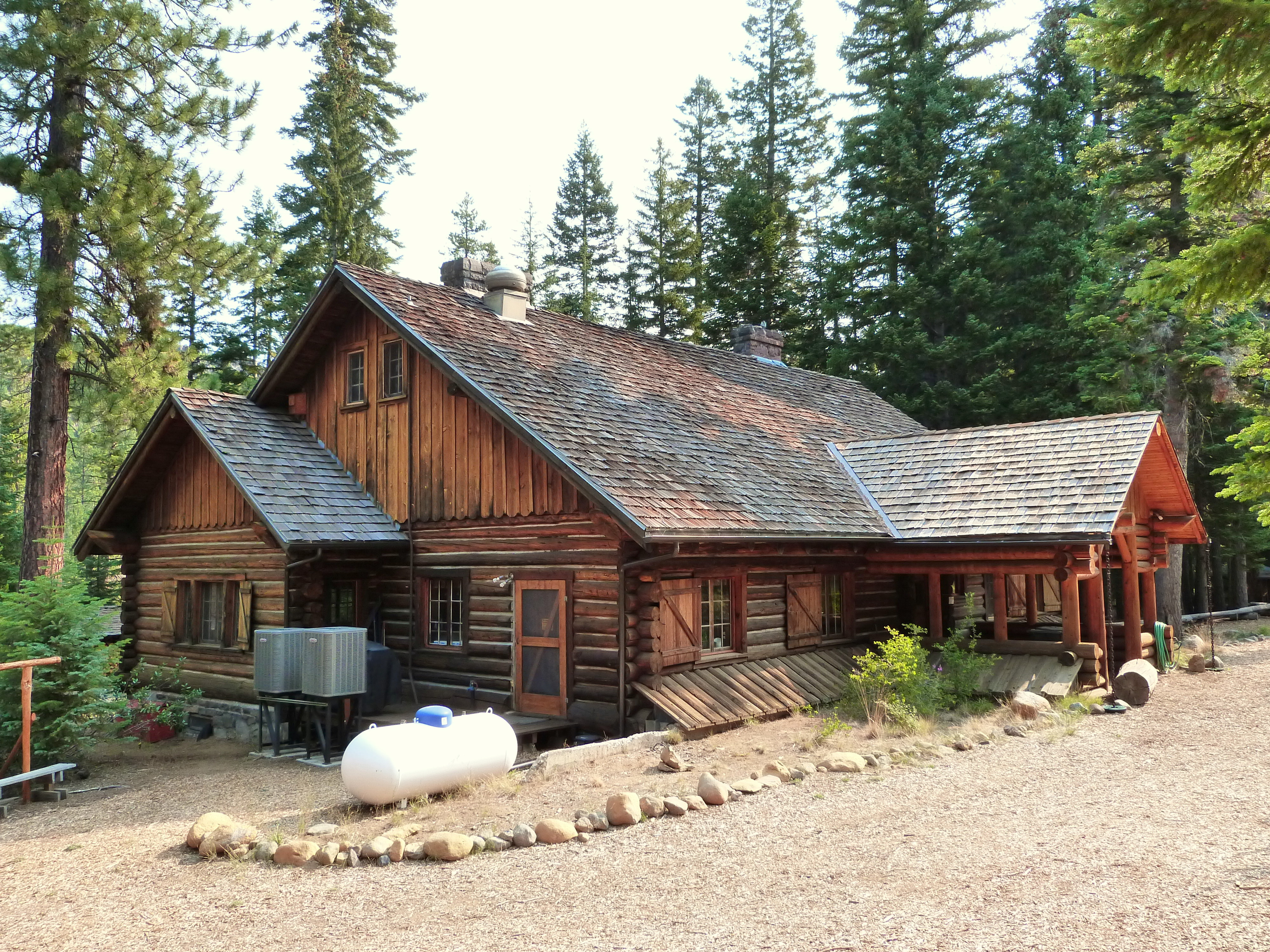
- Bend Skyliners Lodge in 2013

- Location within Oregon Location within the United States
- Nearest city: Bend, Oregon
- Coordinates: 44°1′53″N 121°31′14″W
- Area: 4.1 acres (1.7 ha)
- Built: 1936
- Architect: Clark, Cleon
- Architectural style: National Park Rustic
- NRHP reference No.: 78002285
- Added to NRHP: June 13, 1978

The Bend Skyliners Lodge, located in Bend, Oregon, is listed on the National Register of Historic Places.

== See also ==
- National Register of Historic Places listings in Deschutes County, Oregon
