= First Presbyterian Church of Redmond =

Historic church in Oregon, United States

- U.S. National Register of Historic Places
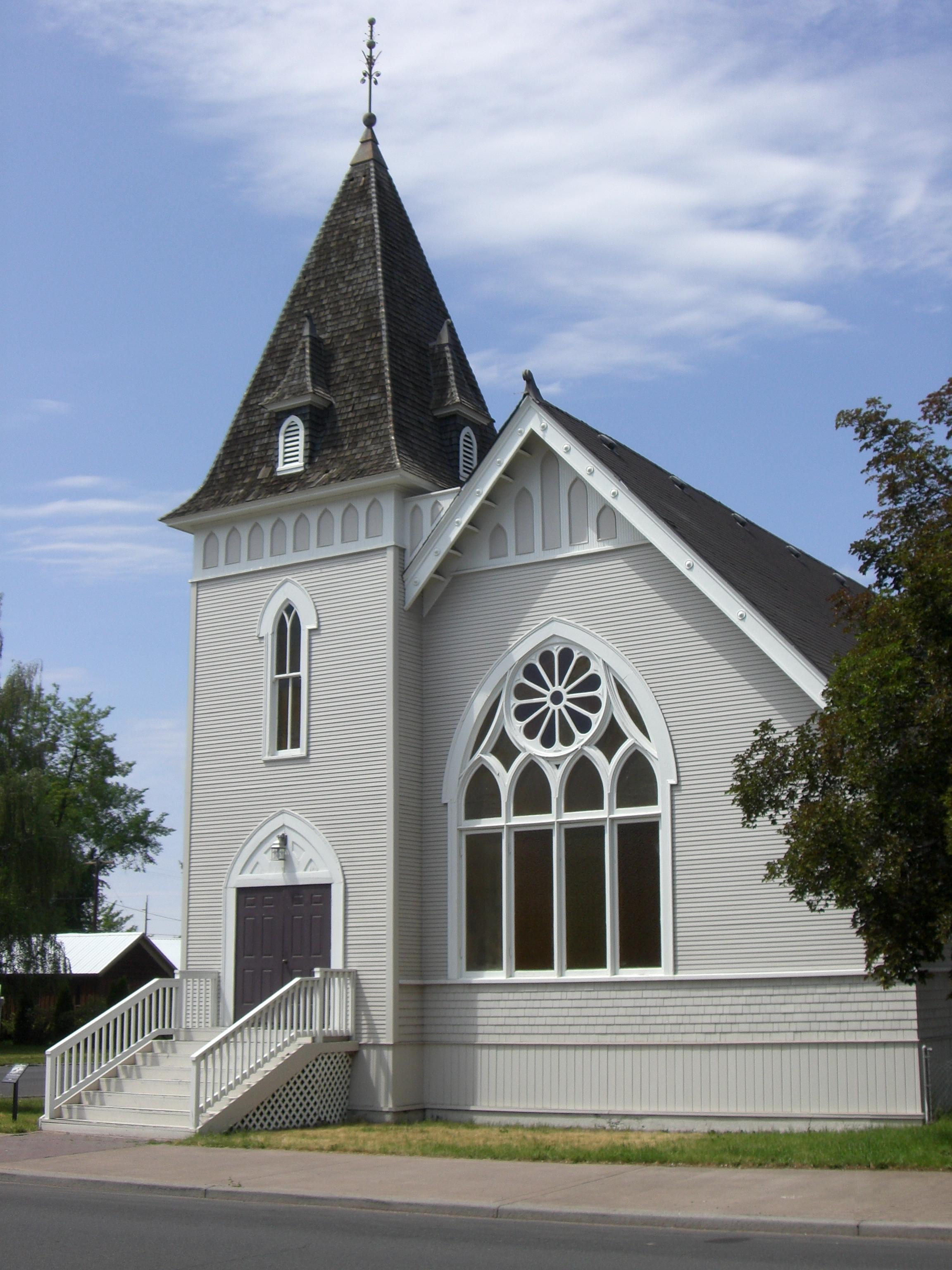
- Used by congregations from 1912 until 1979
- Location: Redmond, Oregon, USA
- Coordinates: 44.27474°N 121.17513°W
- Built: 1912
- Architectural style: Gothic Revival
- NRHP reference No.: 01000931
- Added to NRHP: 2001

Built in 1912, the First Presbyterian Church of Redmond is the oldest standing church structure in the city of Redmond, Oregon, United States. It is also the second-oldest religious building in Deschutes County. The church was built in the Gothic Revival style with Queen Anne architectural detailing. It was the home of Protestant congregations from 1912 until 1979. Today, the building is privately owned and used as a special events venue. The First Presbyterian Church of Redmond was listed on the National Register of Historic Places in 2001.

== History ==
The first Presbyterian congregation in Redmond was organized in 1906, one year after the city was founded. The church was established by Reverend Jesse C. George under the authority and guidance of an existing Presbytery in Pendleton, Oregon. The Pendleton Presbytery had sent Reverend George to Central Oregon in 1905 to minister to the Tumalo community fifteen miles southwest of Redmond. Shortly after arriving, a number of Redmond residents asked him to conduct Presbyterian services in their community as well. Over the next few years, George established the Redmond congregation with the help of Reverend J. W. Mitchell of the Sisters Presbyterian Church and Reverend Levi Johnson, an itinerant pastor who eventually founded eleven churches in Eastern Oregon communities.

The new Presbyterian congregation held services in a number of locations around the city. In 1910, the congregation bought three adjacent lots along 7th Street in downtown Redmond for a permanent church building. A ground-breaking ceremony was held on July 31, 1911. The building was completed the following spring and dedicated on June 30, 1912. Shortly after the church's dedication, Redmond's local newspaper reported that the church had cost $5,000 to build and had seating capacity for 250 parishioners.

The church continued to grow along with the city of Redmond. In 1929, the First Methodist Church of Redmond had lost its minister and was struggling financially so by mutual consent, the First Methodist congregation was merged into the First Presbyterian Church. The combined congregation sold the First Methodist Church property, retaining the First Presbyterian Church and its minister. With permission from the Pendleton Presbytery, the church was officially renamed the Redmond Community Presbyterian Church on October 1, 1929.

A major renovation of the church was begun in 1943 and completed in the spring of 1944. The changes included reorienting the sanctuary. The original design had the congregation seated in a semicircle facing east. In the new design, the pews were set in parallel rows along the length of the building facing north. A classroom area was open up and incorporated into the sanctuary to provide space for the altar, pulpit, and choir seating at the north end of the room. The church's new sanctuary was dedicated on June 18, 1944. A large non-historic education and fellowship hall was built next to the original church in 1948.

The church and adjacent fellowship hall were used by the Presbyterian congregation until 1979, when the church was relocated to a new facility on N.W. 19th Street. The buildings were then sold to a private investor, but the historic church structure remained vacant until 1992. The original 1912 building was resold at that time, and the new owners opened the Redmond School of Dance in the historic building. The dance school closed in 2003 and the building was once again sold to investors. In 2004, the building was purchased for use as a special events venue. Today, the building houses a private business known as The Historic Redmond Church. It rents space for weddings, concerts, lectures, art exhibits, workshops, and community meetings.

The First Presbyterian Church of Redmond is the oldest church building in the city and the second-oldest religious structure in Deschutes County. Because of the building's Gothic Revival architecture and its importance to the history of Central Oregon, the First Presbyterian Church of Redmond was listed on the National Register of Historic Places on September 3, 2001.

== Structure ==
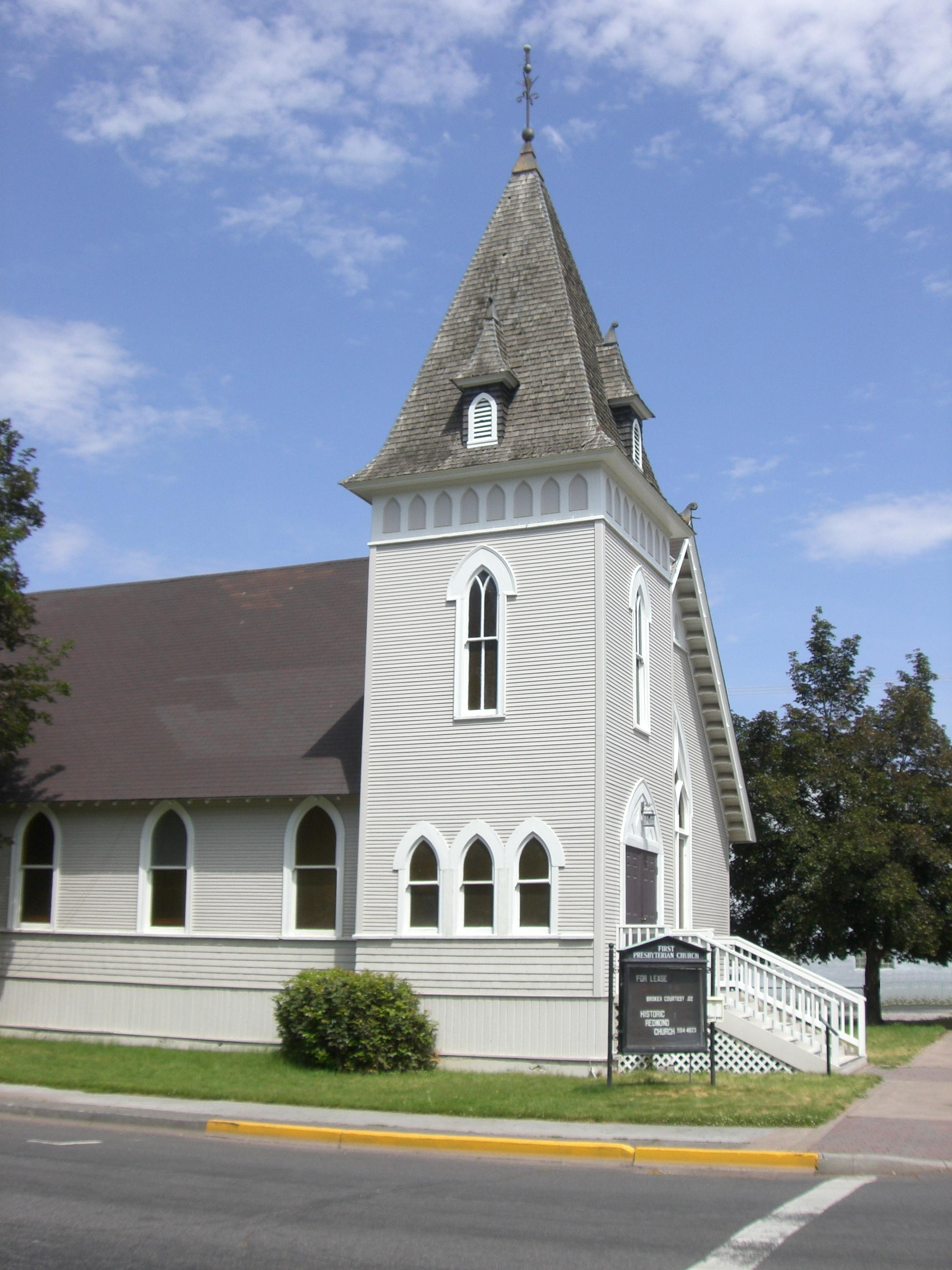
The Historic Redmond Church, 2009

The First Presbyterian Church is located on a 100-by-100-foot city lot on the corner of 7th Street and Cascade Avenue within the original Redmond townsite. The building is sited on the western side of the lot with the entrance facing Cascade Avenue. The entry steps begin at the public sidewalk along Cascade Avenue. On the 7th Street frontage, there is a four-foot landscaped lawn between the structure and the sidewalk. The east side of the lot is used for parking.

The church was built in the Gothic Revival style with Queen Anne architectural detailing. It is a rectangular one-story building with a structural footprint measuring 72 feet by 40 feet. There is a two-story steeple on the southwest corner of the building above the main entrance. At the top of the steeple is a belfry that houses the church-s original 40-inch-diameter (1,000 mm) bell, which was cast by the American Bell and Foundry Company of Northville, Michigan. At the peak of the steeple is a tall, ornate finial with decorative globes, fans, and scrollwork.

All of the church windows are Gothic arch style. The main sanctuary window is made up of four Gothic arch windows that support a rose window with ornate tracery. The entire window group is set into a large Gothic arch frame. On the east side of the church is a large bay window. In the original church design, this bay window feature was the focal point of the interior sanctuary space.

== Interior ==
The ceiling in the church sanctuary is 19 feet high. The sanctuary walls are lath and plaster with a wooden wainscoting to a height of three-and-a-half feet. The sanctuary pews were originally arranged in a semicircle facing a large bay window on the east side of the building. In 1944, the sanctuary was reoriented along the length of the building with the pews facing an expanded altar and choir area at the north end of the room. Today, the sanctuary space is open and can be arranged as required for specific events.

There are two rooms in the northwest corner of the building. Both are approximately 12 feet by 12 feet. The rooms have 13-foot ceilings and the same lath and plaster walls and wainscoting as the sanctuary. The rooms have hanging glass-globe lights that are original to the building. A hallway runs from the sanctuary along the northeast corner of the building to the back door. It also provides access to a restroom and an office area that was once the church organ's mechanical room.
