= Thomas Goodwillie =

Thomas Goodwillie may refer to:

- Thomas Goodwillie (sculptor)
- Thomas Goodwillie (mathematician)
