= Heritage conservation in Canada =

Overview of preservation of Canadian cultural history

In Canada, heritage conservation deals with actions or processes that are aimed at safeguarding the character-defining elements of a cultural resource so as to retain its heritage value and extend its physical life. Historic objects and places in Canada may be granted special designation by any of the three levels of government: the federal government, the provincial governments, or a municipal government. The National Trust for Canada (formerly Heritage Canada Foundation) acts as Canada's lead advocacy organization for heritage buildings and landscapes.

== Federal level ==
There are a number of heritage designations at the federal level for historic sites in Canada:

- National Historic Sites of Canada are places that have been designated by the federal Minister of the Environment on the advice of the Historic Sites and Monuments Board of Canada (HSMBC), as being of national historic significance;
- Heritage Railway Stations are train stations owned by federally licensed railway companies recommended for protection by the HSMBC;
- Heritage Lighthouses are lighthouses deemed to be historically significant; and
- Federal Heritage Buildings are buildings owned by the federal government which are determined to be of historical and/or architectural value.

The federal government also operates related programs for the recognition of historic persons (National Historic Persons) and events (National Historic Events).

== Provinces ==
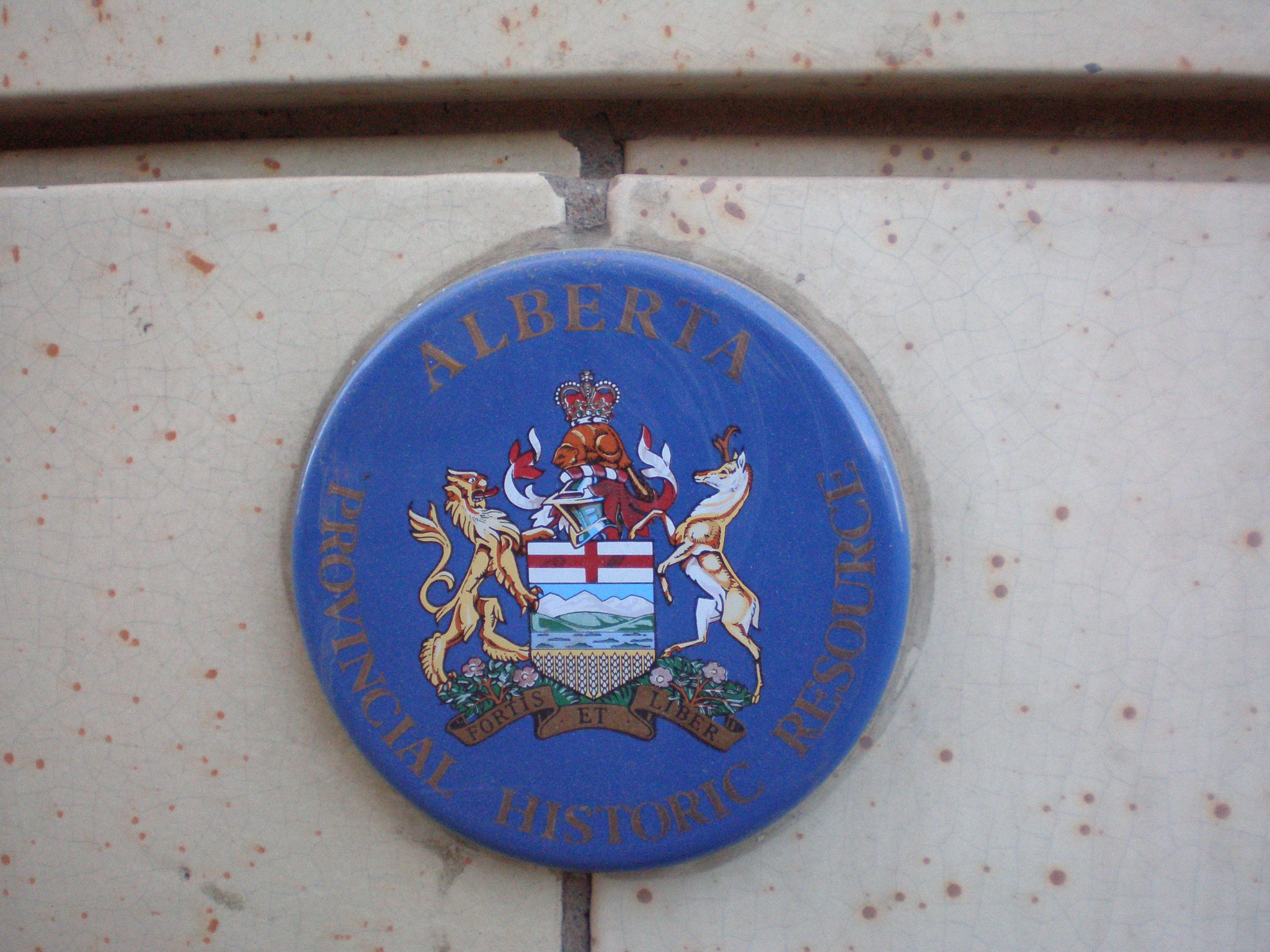
This plaque indicates that the building is protected by the Government of Alberta.

Each provincial government has distinct systems and approaches to heritage conservation. They may delegate the authority to preserve historic buildings to municipalities, and/or have a provincial heritage register.

For example, in the province of Alberta, only sites owned by the provincial government and run as a functioning historic site or museum are known as Provincial Historic Sites or Provincial Historic Areas. Buildings and sites owned by private citizens and companies or other levels or branches of government may gain one of two levels of historic designation, "Registered Historic Resource" or "Provincial Historic Resource". Historic designation in Alberta is governed by the Historic Resources Act. The province also lists buildings deemed historically significant by municipal governments on the Alberta Register of Historic Places, which is also part of the larger Canadian Register of Historic Places although this does not imply provincial or federal government status or protection. To supplement this system, the province also runs the Alberta Main Street Program which helps to preserve historic buildings in the downtowns of smaller communities. The basis for the preservation system in Alberta is the Heritage Survey Program, which is a survey of 80,000 historic buildings in Alberta that lack a protected status but are documented for possible future protection.

In Quebec, the Répertoire du patrimoine culturel du Québec is the main heritage register, it includes both protected and unprotected properties. The Conseil du patrimoine religieux du Québec is a non-profit organization created in 1995 to promote the conservation of churches and other religious heritage buildings in the province.

== Municipalities ==
Cities, towns, counties, and other local governments in Canada may use zoning and other bylaws to restrict the demolition of individual historic buildings or districts. They may maintain a municipal heritage register, such as Edmonton's "Register of Historic Resources in Edmonton". The city of Vancouver uses a traditional heritage register and a new system called a density bank, under which developers are rewarded for preserving and restoring heritage buildings by being awarded exceptions to restrictions (usually height restrictions) on other sites they own.

In Montreal, one of Canada's oldest and most historically rich cities, the Le Conseil du patrimoine de Montréal advises the municipal government on matters related to heritage building preservation. Two non-governmental organizations have worked to preserve Montreal’s historic buildings since the 1970s: Save Montreal, co-founded by Michael Fish in 1974, and Heritage Montreal, founded by Phyllis Lambert two years later. In October 2009, Lambert, Heritage Montreal and others formed a think tank called the Institut de politiques alternatives de Montréal to advise the city on a range of matters including urban planning, development and heritage.

== Government approach to policy ==
Two of the primary conservation tools in Canada are the Canadian Register of Historic Places and the Standards and Guidelines for the Conservation of Historic Places in Canada. The latter was the result of a major collaborative effort among federal, provincial, territorial and municipal governments, heritage conservation professionals, heritage developers and many individual Canadians. As a pan-Canadian collaboration, it is intended to reinforce the development of a culture of conservation in Canada, which continues to find unique expression in each of the country's jurisdictions and regions. The document breaks down conservation approaches into three categories: Preservation, Rehabilitation, and Restoration. As published in the Standards and Guidelines for the Conservation of Historic Places in Canada, these conservation approaches are defined as follows:

- Preservation: the action or process of protecting, maintaining, and/or stabilizing the existing materials, form, and integrity of a historic place or of an individual component, while protecting its heritage value. Preservation can include both short-term and interim measures to protect or stabilize the place, as well as long-term actions to retard deterioration or prevent damage so that the place can be kept serviceable through routine maintenance and minimal repair, rather than extensive replacement and new construction.
- Rehabilitation: the action or process of making possible a continuing or compatible contemporary use of a historic place or an individual component, through repair, alterations, and/ or additions, while protecting its heritage value.
- Restoration: the action or process of accurately revealing, recovering or representing the state of a historic place or of an individual component, as it appeared at a particular period in its history, while protecting its heritage value.

== See also ==
- National Trust for Canada
- Maison Alcan, a notable example of private sector historic preservation in Montreal.
