= Western false front architecture =

Style of architecture in the Southwestern United States

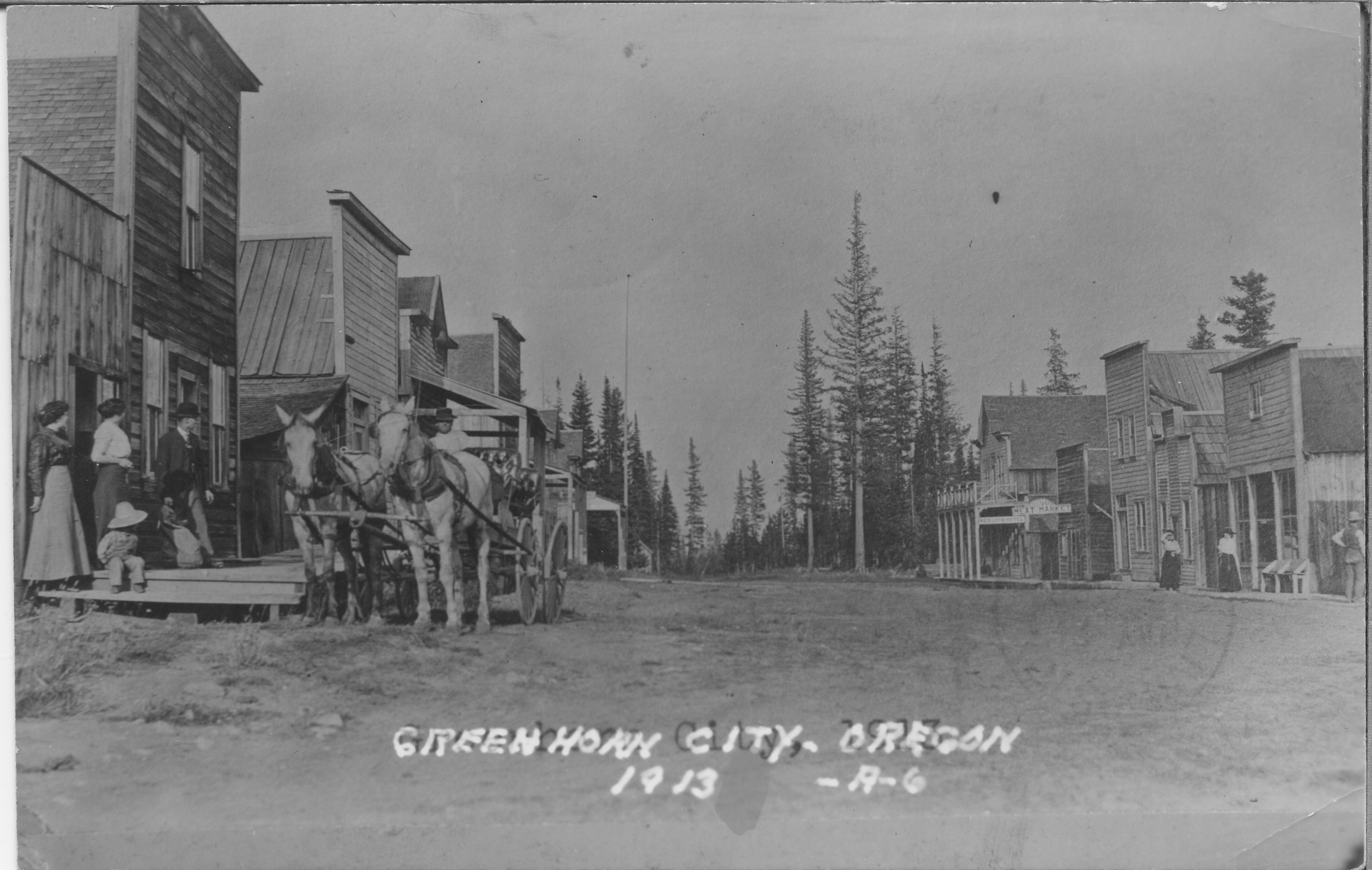
False front commercial buildings in Greenhorn, Oregon, 1913

Western false front architecture or false front commercial architecture is a type of commercial architecture used in the Old West of the United States. Often used on two-story buildings, the style includes a false front facade often hiding a gable roof.

The goal for buildings in this style is to project an image of stability and success. By emulating the rectangular profile of buildings in eastern North American cities, the style attempted to lend a more settled, urban feel to small frontier towns.

Western false front architecture contains the following features:

- the front façade of the building has a parapet that largely conceals the roof;
- the building either has a front gable, gambrel or a bowed roof; and
- higher grade materials and greater ornamentation that is featured on the façade compared to other sides of the building.

Hundreds of false front buildings were constructed in the Bend, Oregon area between 1900 and 1910, including the N. P. Smith Pioneer Hardware Store.

== See also ==
- Facadism
- Potemkin village
- Western (genre)
- Western saloon
- Blazing Saddles
