= Queensland Country Life =

Australian newspaper

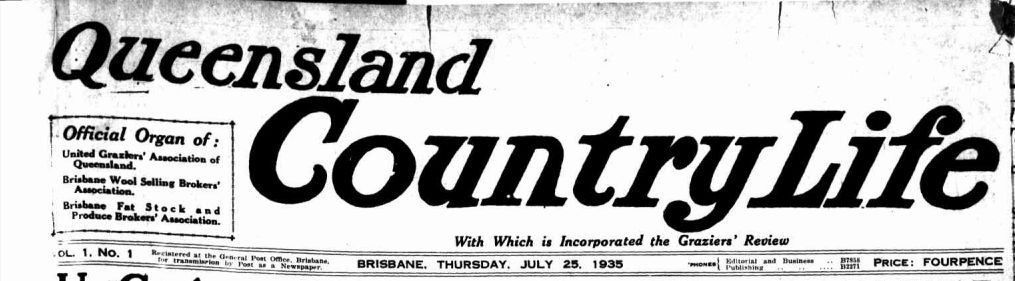
Queensland Country Life, masthead of first issue, Thurs 25 July 1935

Queensland Country Life is a newspaper published in Queensland, Australia, since 1935. It focuses on rural news.It is owned by Australian Community Media, the paper has suffered from issues regarding Media bias, Generative AI and ACM has also been subject to issues with management.

== History ==
The Queensland Country Life newspaper is the second of that name. The first newspaper was published from 1900 to 1910 and is unrelated to the current newspaper.

The Queensland Country Life newspaper was first published on 25 July 1935. In its first issue, it described itself as a subsidiary of a New South Wales newspaper Country Life and that it incorporated the Grazier's Review and was the official organ of the:

- United Graziers' Association of Queensland
- Brisbane Wool Selling Brokers' Association
- Brisbane Fat Stock and Produce Brokers' Association

The newspaper is published once a week.

== Digitisation ==
The paper has been digitised as part of the Australian Newspapers Digitisation Program of the National Library of Australia.

== See also ==
- List of newspapers in Australia
- Queensland Country Life Building
