= Queensland Country Life Building facade =

Heritage-listed building in Brisbane, Queensland

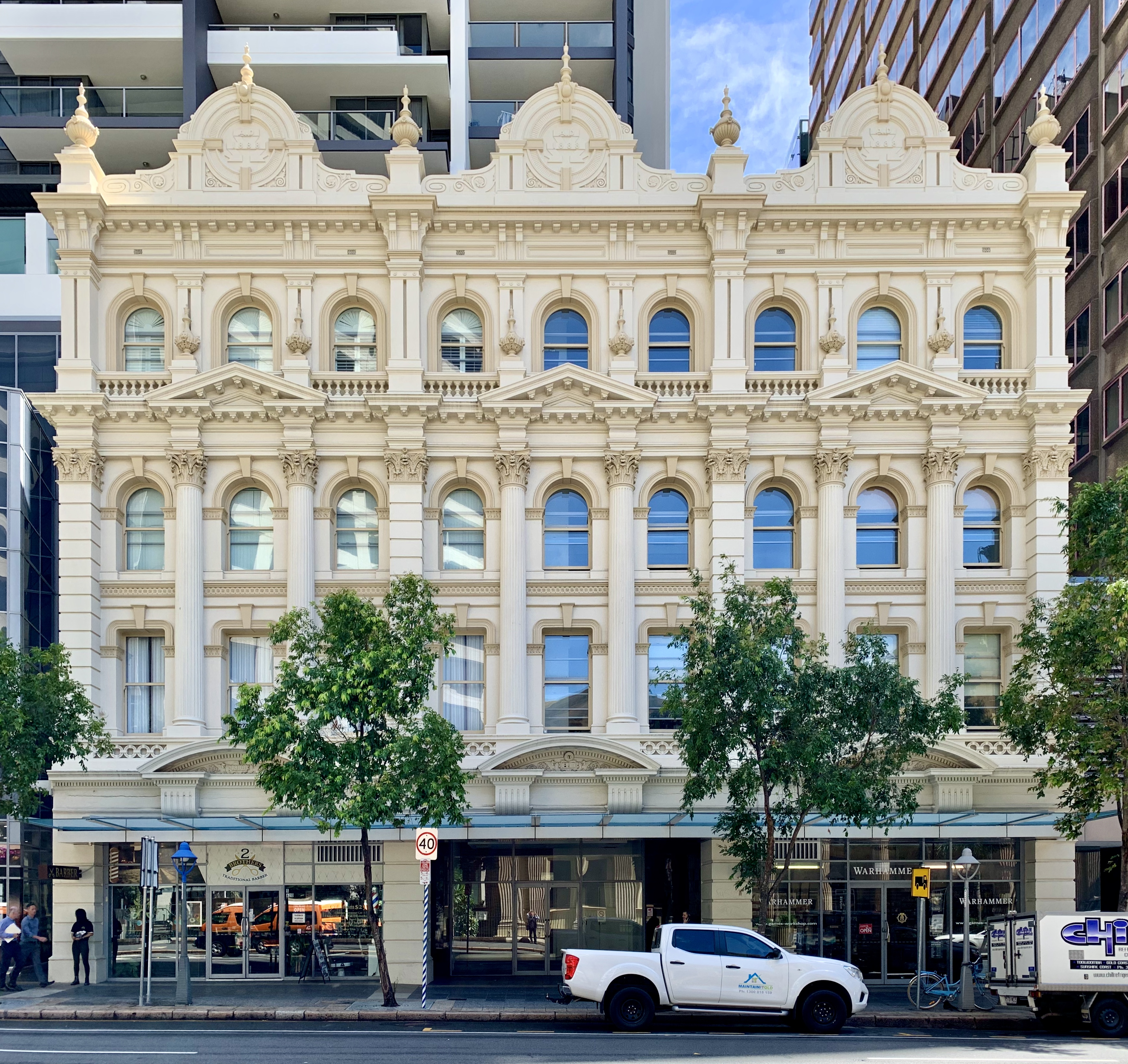
- Queensland Country Life Building facade on the front of the Aurora Tower, 2020

- Location within Queensland Location within Australia
- 27.4653°S 153.0307°E
- Location: 424–426 Queen Street, Brisbane City, City of Brisbane, Queensland, Australia

History
- Design period: 1870s–1890s (late 19th century)
- Built: 1888–1889

Site notes
- Architect: Richard Gailey
- Architectural style: Italianate

Queensland Heritage Register
- Official name: Former Queensland Country Life Building facade, Hill's Buildings
- Type: state heritage (built)
- Designated: 21 October 1992
- Reference no.: 600158
- Significant period: 1888–1889 (fabric); 1889–1991, 1955 (historical)
- Builders: George Gazzard

The Queensland Country Life Building facade is a heritage-listed facade of a former warehouse at 424–426 Queen Street, Brisbane City, City of Brisbane, Queensland, Australia. It was designed by Richard Gailey and built from 1888 to 1889 by George Gazzard. It is also known as Hill's Buildings. It was added to the Queensland Heritage Register on 21 October 1992.

== History ==
The former Queensland Country Life Building was constructed in 1888–1889 as a speculative venture for influential Queensland pastoralists, politicians, company directors and businessmen, Charles Lumley Hill and John Stevenson. Known originally as Hill's Buildings, this group of four warehouses was sited opposite the Customs House and close to the municipal wharves at Petrie Bight, and was designed to attract shipping companies, merchants, warehousemen, bond storekeepers, insurance companies and others as tenants. Together with the Customs House, the building was constructed during a building boom which saw a number of notable public and commercial buildings erected in Brisbane during the 1880s.

The present Customs House was constructed between 1886 and 1889, replacing a smaller building erected in 1850. The site for the Customs House was chosen in 1849 after considerable discussion as to the most suitable location. At the time, shipping activity was centred on the South Brisbane Reach, and the decision to locate the Customs House at the northern end of the Town Reach acted as an impetus for the development of wharves on this part of the river, and warehouses in the immediate vicinity. The earlier building became increasingly inadequate as Brisbane developed as the major port in the colony, and in 1884 the Queensland Government decided to construct a new Customs House.

The growing importance of this part of the city is further reflected in the construction of the Eagle Street Fountain (also known as the Mooney Memorial Fountain) between 1878 and 1880 as part of measures to enhance the visual character of the area.

The warehouses were constructed as a four-storeyed masonry building divided into four bays, with individual entrances, and were erected in two consecutive stages. Part of the site was transferred to Hill in August 1881, part also to Hill in January 1888, and the remainder to Stevenson in October 1888. In January 1888, established Brisbane architect Richard Gailey, acting for Charles Lumley Hill, invited expressions of interest from prospective tenants in new business premises to be erected opposite the Customs House, with a frontage of 51 feet (16 m) to Queen Street. He indicated that no expense was to be spared in either design or utility. In March 1888, Gailey called tenders, again on Lumley Hill's behalf, for the construction of two warehouses at Petrie Bight. A contract for the two warehouses was let in April to George Gazzard, who tendered with a price of £8,900. Gailey and Gazzard had collaborated on a number of major Brisbane projects in the 1880s, including the Regatta Hotel (1886), Treasury Chambers (1886–1887), and Brisbane Girls Grammar School. In July 1888, Gailey called tenders for the construction of another two warehouses at Petrie's Bight, and the successful tenderer was again George Gazzard, with a price of £8,444.

The warehouses were completed toward the end of the boom decade, and proved slow to let. One of the first tenants was Taylor, Enoch & Co., wholesale boot importers, who occupied the northern warehouse c. 1890. The other three warehouses were listed as vacant in the 1891 Brisbane Post Office Directory, but RL Armour, warehousemen and importers of general drapery and fancy goods, had moved to the building by 1892. WJ Weatherill, consular agent for the United States of America, importer, and manager of the Queensland Post Office Directory, occupied offices in Hill's Buildings during the second half of the 1890s. The shipping line William Howard Smith and Sons later occupied offices in the building. Edward Butler and Sons (initially Edward Butler & Frederick Rathbone), importers of wholesale saddlery, leased part of the building from January 1899 until 1948, when Edward Butler & Co purchased the warehouse they were leasing.

In 1905, Stevenson's part of the property passed to the Australian Mutual Provident Society, as mortgagee. Lumley Hill died in 1909, and his widow sold her interest in this property in 1911. There followed a variety of owners and lessees of the four warehouses, but the two most closely associated with the building in the second half of the 19th century were the United Graziers' Association and the Queensland Country Life newspaper. In late 1955, Queensland Country Life announced that it was moving to ground floor premises in the United Graziers' Association building at 432 Queen Street. In 1964 the trustees of the United Graziers' Association of Queensland, Union of Employers, purchased part of the site, and in 1977 this was transferred to Queensland Country Life Newspaper Pty Ltd. In 1973 the northern warehouse was sold and subsequently demolished for the construction of an adjoining highrise. The existing facade was retained when the remainder of the building was demolished in 1991.

The facade stood with minimal support on an empty site for many years until it was incorporated into the development of the Aurora Tower, then the tallest residential tower in Brisbane, built between 2003 and 2006.

== Description ==
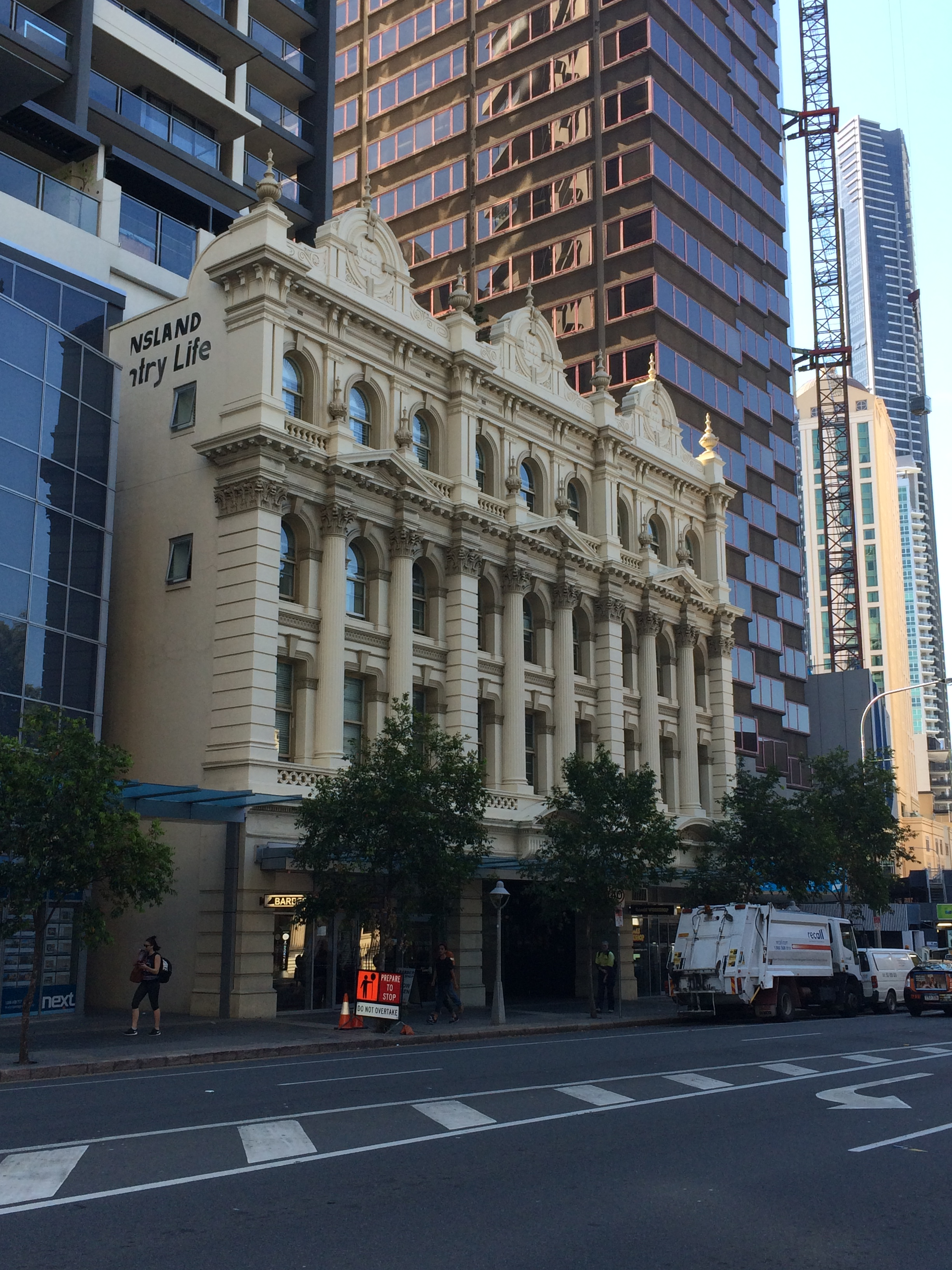
Part of the "Queensland Country Life" signage remains on the side of the building, 2015

The existing main facade comprises three identical bays. The northern matching bay and the remainder of the building have been demolished. The facade is lavishly decorated with Victorian Italianate detail executed in rendered brickwork, on the upper three of its four storeys.

The three remaining bays are identical in elevation. At street level all the original detailing has been removed, except for the large curved pediments above each entry. The first and second floors are linked by giant order Corinthian pilasters which support a highly moulded frieze and cornice. The central pilasters of each bay have a pediment, which rises above the cornice. On the top floor the line of the large lower pilasters is continued by smaller paired pilasters. The bays of the building at parapet level are divided by pedestals supporting urns. Each bay has a central semi-circular pediment containing the date A.D. 1888 in raised lettering, and is topped by a small finial which completes a striking silhouette.

== Heritage listing ==
The Queensland Country Life Building facade was listed on the Queensland Heritage Register on 21 October 1992 having satisfied the following criteria.

The place is important in demonstrating the evolution or pattern of Queensland's history.

The facade of the former Queensland Country Life Building dates from 1888 to 1889, and together with the Customs House opposite, is one of the few structures which provide evidence of the official entrance to the former Port of Brisbane. As a remnant of a commercial warehouse, the facade provides important evidence of the development of the Town Reach area as an important commercial warehousing district.

The place is important in demonstrating the principal characteristics of a particular class of cultural places.

It survives as an example of the work of architect Richard Gailey, whose firm was responsible for many of the ornamental boom-era commercial buildings of the 1880s, which defined Brisbane's image as a late-Victorian city until well into the middle of the 20th century.

The place is important because of its aesthetic significance.

The facade makes a strong contribution to the streetscape as an important element near the intersection of Queen and Wharf Street, and as a complement in scale and style to the Customs House opposite.
