= Standards and Guidelines for the Conservation of Historic Places in Canada =

Drafted in the late 1990s, the Standards and Guidelines was the first comprehensive approach to creating a national approach to heritage conservation in Canada.

The first edition of the Standards and Guidelines was loosely modelled on the American standards. All jurisdictions have adopted the Standards and Guidelines as the tool for approaching conservation of various types of historic places (buildings, cultural landscapes, engineering structures etc.), which is now in its second edition. The Canadian Government employs the Standards and Guidelines under its Federal Heritage Buildings Review Office for managing interventions to federal heritage buildings.

On February 25, 2011, the Government of Canada launched the second edition of the Standards and Guidelines. This second edition expands and clarifies the information contained in the original 2003 edition.
