= Bend metropolitan area =

Coordinates: 44°10′N 120°40′W

- Metropolitan Statistical Area
- Bend, OR Metropolitan Statistical Area
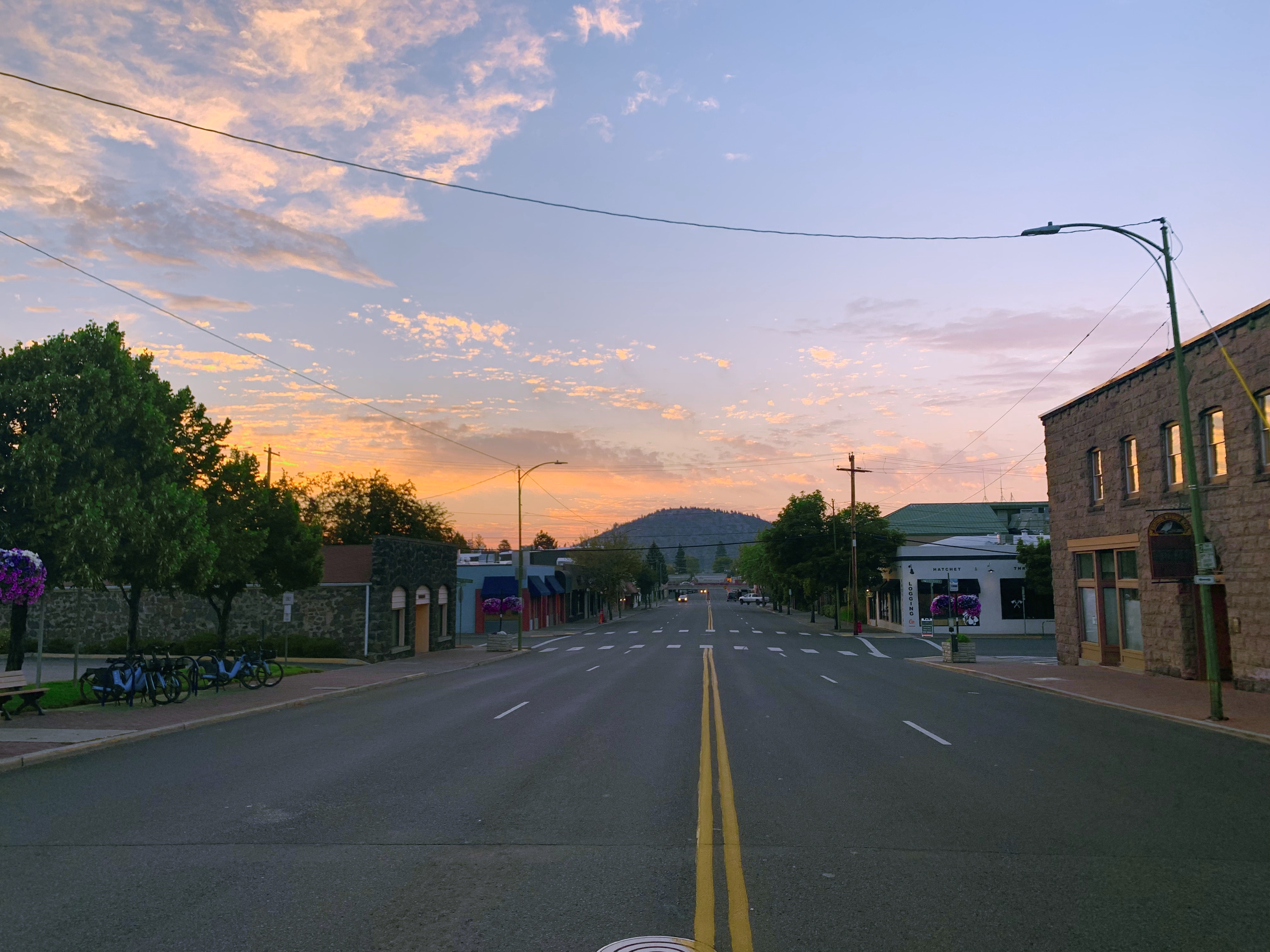
- View of Pilot Butte from downtown, 2022
Bend, OR MSA
City of Bend
City of Prineville
City of Madras
Bend, OR MSA
- Country: United States
- State: Oregon
- Largest city: Bend
- Other cities: Prineville

Population (2020)
  - Total: 248,974
  - Estimate (2023): 260,919

GDP
  - Metro: $15.446 billion (2023)
- Time zone: UTC−8 (PST)
  - Summer (DST): UTC−7 (PDT)

The Bend, OR Metropolitan Statistical Area, as defined by the U.S. Office of Management and Budget (OMB), is a three-county metropolitan area in Central Oregon anchored by the city of Bend. It is the fourth largest metropolitan statistical area (MSA) in Oregon and the 190th largest in the United States by population. As of the 2020 census, the MSA had a population of 247,493, increasing to an estimated 266,376 in 2025.

== History ==
The Bend, OR MSA was first defined by the OMB in 2003, initially consisting of solely Deschutes County. The MSA was combined with the neighboring Crook County, designated the Prineville, OR Micropolitan Statistical Area (µSA), to form the Bend–Prineville, OR Combined Statistical Area (CSA). The MSA was briefly renamed the Bend–Redmond, OR MSA from 2013 to 2018, with the CSA being renamed the Bend–Redmond–Prineville, OR CSA. In 2023, Crook County and Jefferson County were added to the Bend MSA, dissolving the Prineville µSA and the Bend–Prineville CSA and giving the MSA its current three-county form.

== Counties ==
| County | Seat | 2025 estimate | 2020 Census | Change | Area | Density |
|---|---|---|---|---|---|---|
| Deschutes | Bend | 213,072 | 198,253 | +7.47% | 3,055 sq mi (7,912 km^{2}) | 70/sq mi (27/km^{2}) |
| Crook | Prineville | 27,564 | 24,738 | +11.42% | 2,987 sq mi (7,736 km^{2}) | 9/sq mi (4/km^{2}) |
| Jefferson | Madras | 25,740 | 24,502 | +5.05% | 1,791 sq mi (4,639 km^{2}) | 14/sq mi (6/km^{2}) |
| Total | | 266,376 | 247,493 | +7.63% | 7,833 sq mi (20,287 km^{2}) | 34/sq mi (13/km^{2}) |

== Communities ==
The following are cities, towns, and villages in the Bend, OR Metropolitan Statistical Area categorized based on the United States Census Bureau 2025 population estimates. No population estimates are released for census-designated places (CDPs), which are marked with an asterisk (*). These places are categorized based on their 2020 Census population.

=== Places with over 100,000 inhabitants ===
- Bend (Principal city) (107,342)

=== Places with 10,000 to 100,000 inhabitants ===
- Redmond (38,547)
- Prineville (11,994)

=== Places with 1,000 to 9,999 inhabitants ===
- Madras (7,829)
- Deschutes River Woods* (5,532)
- Crooked River Ranch* (4,912)
- Three Rivers* (3,014)
- Sisters (2,934)
- Eagle Crest* (2,761)
- Juniper Canyon* (2,564)
- La Pine (2,563)
- Warm Springs* (2,435)
- Sunriver* (2,023)
- Culver (1,689)
- Prineville Lake Acres* (1,556)
- Terrebonne* (1,393)
- Metolius (1,039)

=== Places with fewer than 1,000 inhabitants ===
- Tetherow* (811)
- Tumalo* (558)
- Ochoco West* (432)
- Seventh Mountain* (407)
- Black Butte Ranch* (260)
- Camp Sherman* (251)
- Pronghorn* (92)
