= Ochoco =

Ochoco may refer to the following places in the U.S. State of Oregon:

- Ochoco Mountains, a mountain range in the central part of the state
- Ochoco National Forest, a National Forest within the Ochoco Mountains
- Ochoco Creek, a creek in the Ochoco Mountains
- Ochoco Dam, a dam along Ochoco Creek
- Ochoco Highway, a highway that passes through the Ochoco Mountains
- Ochoco State Scenic Viewpoint, a state park located in the Ochoco Mountains
- Ochoco Summit, a mountain pass traversed by the Ochoco Highway in the Ochoco Mountains
- Ochoco West, Oregon, a census-designated place at the western foot of the Ochoco Mountains
