= High Desert (Oregon) =

Region of the U.S. state of Oregon

- "Oregon Outback" and "Great Sandy Desert"
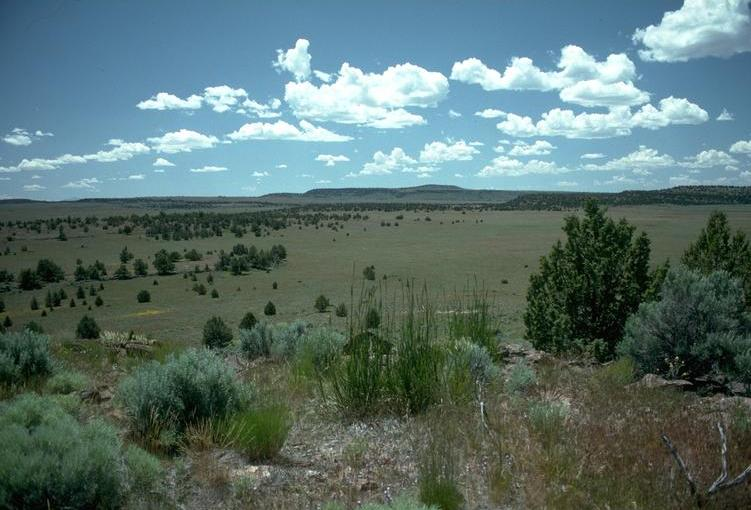
- The Oregon high desert near Frenchglen

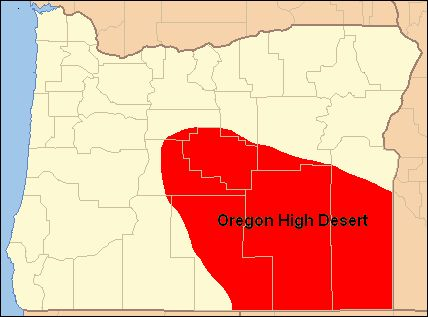
- Map of Oregon's high desert region
- Length: 130 mi (210 km)
- Width: 200 mi (320 km)

Geography
- Location: Oregon, United States
- Population centers: Bend, Burns, Redmond, Lakeview, and Prineville
- Borders on: Cascade Range (west); Blue Mountains (north); Idaho border (east); Nevada border (south)
- Coordinates: 43.316053°N 118.78418°W

The Oregon High Desert is located in the southeast of the U.S. state of Oregon, east of the Cascade Range and south of the Blue Mountains. The desert covers most of five Oregon counties and averages 4,000 feet (1,200 m) in altitude. The northern region is part of the Columbia Plateau, where higher levels of rainfall allow the largest industry on private land to be the cultivation of alfalfa and hay. The southwest region is part of the Great Basin and the southeast is the lower Owyhee River watershed. The U.S. Bureau of Land Management owns most of the region's public land and manages more than 30,000 square miles (78,000 km^{2}) including five rivers designated as Wild and Scenic.

Compared to Western Oregon, the high desert is arid, averaging 15 inches (380 mm) of annual rainfall. Contrary to its name, most of the high desert is not dry enough to truly qualify as desert, and ecologically, most of the region is classified as shrubland or steppe.

At 9,733 ft (2,967 m) above sea level, the summit of Steens Mountain is the highest point in the high desert. The broad fault-block mountain is characteristic of the basin and range plate tectonics of the high desert. About 16 million years ago, during the early Miocene epoch, lava flows from volcanic eruptions covered about half the surface area of Oregon. The Earth's crust then began stretching, giving way to further volcanic activity from 15 million to 2 million years ago. Several ice ages over this time formed the large lakes in the high desert.

The climate of the high desert provides habitat for mammals such as pronghorn, coyote, mule deer, black-tailed jackrabbit, and cougar. Birds common in the region include sage-grouse, California quail, and prairie falcon. The western juniper is the most common tree in the region, and big sagebrush and common woolly sunflower are the region's most widespread plants.

== Geography ==
The high desert of Oregon is located in the central and southeastern parts of the state. It covers approximately 24,000 square miles (62,000 km^{2}), extending approximately 200 miles (320 km) from central Oregon east to the Idaho border and 130 mi (210 km) from central Oregon south to the Nevada border. Most of the region is located in Crook, Deschutes, Harney, Lake, and Malheur counties.

The high desert is named as such for its generally high elevation, averaging about 4,000 feet (1,200 m) across the region. It is bordered by the eastern foothills of the Cascade Range to the west. The Blue Mountains are the geographical boundary to the north, marking the northern end of the high desert's semi-arid plateau. The southern high desert is part of North America's Basin and Range Province, which extends south through Nevada and Arizona and into Mexico. It contains large alkali lakes and tall cliffs, some with a prominence of more than 2,000 ft (610 m). Steens Mountain, in Harney County, is the highest point within the region; its summit is 9,733 ft (2,967 m) above sea level. To the east, the high desert country of the Columbia Plateau extends across the Snake River and into Idaho.

A number of rivers flow through the high desert region. These include the Deschutes River and its tributary the Crooked River, as well as the Malheur, Owyhee, and John Day rivers, which are all within the Columbia River watershed. Because the high desert encompasses the portion of the hydrographic Great Basin located in Oregon, smaller rivers in the high desert flow into closed basins. The Chewaucan River, the Donner und Blitzen River, and the Silvies River each flow into some of the high desert's salt lakes.

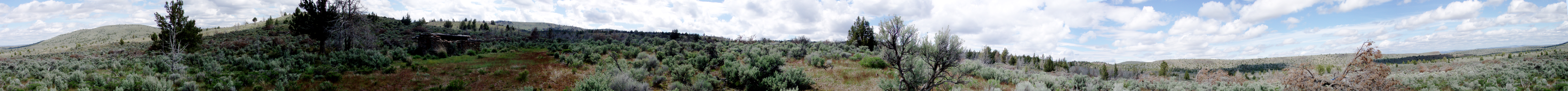
Stitched panorama of the Central Oregon high desert, near the GI ranch. Includes pioneer stone house.

=== Land use ===
The largest landowner in eastern Oregon is the U.S. government. The Bureau of Land Management administers over 13.6 million acres (55,000 km^{2}) in the bureau's Burns, Lakeview, Prineville, and Vale districts, most of which are in the state's high desert country. In addition, Congress has designated specific sections of the Crooked, Deschutes, Donner und Blitzen, Malheur, and Owyhee rivers as part of the National Wild and Scenic Rivers System.

Agriculture is the largest industry in the region. Livestock ranches utilize large tracts of private and government land for grazing. Ranchers raise cattle and sheep in many parts of the region. Because of low rainfall, most crops require irrigation. Agricultural crops include alfalfa and other hay crops, wheat, oats, barley, potatoes, onions, sugar beets, and mint.

== Geology ==
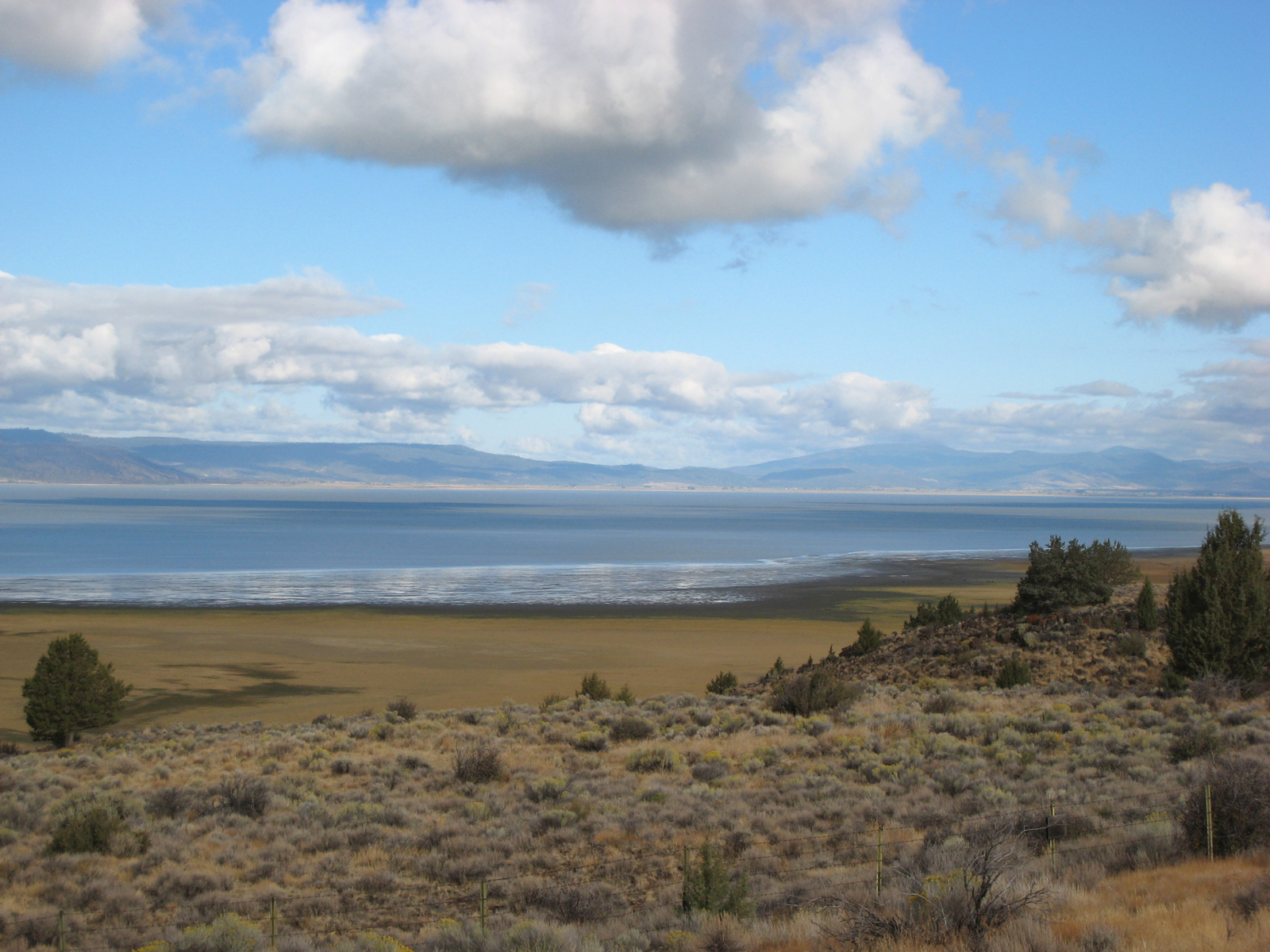
Like other lakes in the high desert, Goose Lake was formed when glaciers melted after ice ages during the Pleistocene epoch.

Between 17 and 15 million years ago, magma from deep beneath eastern Oregon rose to the Earth's surface, causing a period of significant volcanic activity. A series of lava floods erupted from fissures near the Oregon–Idaho–Washington border. The resulting lava flows traveled up to 400 miles (640 km) from their source. Some individual flows covered as much as 10,000 square miles (26,000 km^{2}) to a depth of 100 feet (30 m). Eventually, these lava flows covered half the state of Oregon, creating a formation known as the Columbia River Basalt Group, the geologic foundation beneath much of the high desert.

After the original eruptions subsided, the Earth's crust began to stretch and crack. Between 15 and 2 million years ago, this created hundreds of new volcanoes that added additional layers of lava on top of the Columbia River Basalt and left behind hundreds of lava tubes. These new flows blanketed the southeastern third of the state. Many of the volcanoes and smaller cinder cones from this period still exist in eastern Oregon. Afterward, subsequent rifting produced large fault-block mountains throughout the region. The escarpment-type mountains and high-elevation valleys created by these faults produced the basin and range landscape that makes up much of Oregon's high desert country.

During the last 2 million years, a series of ice ages altered the landscape. As each ice sheet melted, runoff and increased rainfall filled many of the region's closed basins, forming large pluvial lakes. The Goose Lake, Harney, and Klamath basins were filled along with many other smaller basins. Some of the lakes covered as much as 1,000 square miles (2,600 km^{2}). However, as the climate became drier, these large lakes shrank away. Goose Lake, Harney Lake, Malheur Lake, Summer Lake, Lake Abert, and the Warner Lakes are remnants of ancient pluvial lakes.

== Climate ==
Contrary to its name, most of the high desert is not dry enough to truly qualify as desert, and biologically, most of the region is classified as shrubland or steppe.

Annual precipitation throughout Oregon's high desert region is relatively low, averaging less than 15 inches (380 mm) in most areas. Bend, the region's largest city, averages about 11 in (280 mm) of precipitation per year. Burns averages about 10 in (250 mm) of precipitation annually, while Rome, in central Malheur County, and the official weather station at Whitehorse Ranch in southeastern Harney County average 8–9 in (200–230 mm) per year and the Alvord Desert receives only 7 in (180 mm). Some of the mountainous areas receive significantly more precipitation as snowfall. For example, the high-elevation city of Lakeview has an average annual snowfall of nearly 68 in (1,700 mm).

The majority of high desert areas receive most precipitation in the winter months, decreasing steadily through late summer into the fall. Some areas in the eastern and southern parts of the region receive peak precipitation in the late spring and early summer. For example, at Hart Mountain in Lake County, the wettest time of the year is March through June. The driest months throughout Oregon's high desert are July through September, though there are still isolated thunderstorms during that period.

Monthly normal high and low temperatures (°F) for various Oregon high desert cities
City	Jan	Feb	Mar	Apr	May	Jun	Jul	Aug	Sep	Oct	Nov	Dec	Annual Max/Min	Citation
Bend	40/23	44/25	51/27	57/30	65/36	73/41	81/46	81/46	72/39	62/32	46/28	40/23	102 / -24	
Burns	35/14	40/19	49/25	57/29	66/36	75/41	85/46	84/44	75/35	62/26	45/21	35/15	102 / -28	
Lakeview	39/21	42/24	48/28	56/32	65/38	74/44	84/55	83/48	75/42	63/33	46/26	39/21	102 / -20	
Prineville	42/21	48/24	54/25	61/28	69/34	77/40	86/43	86/42	78/35	66/29	49/25	42/21	107 / -34	

== Ecology ==
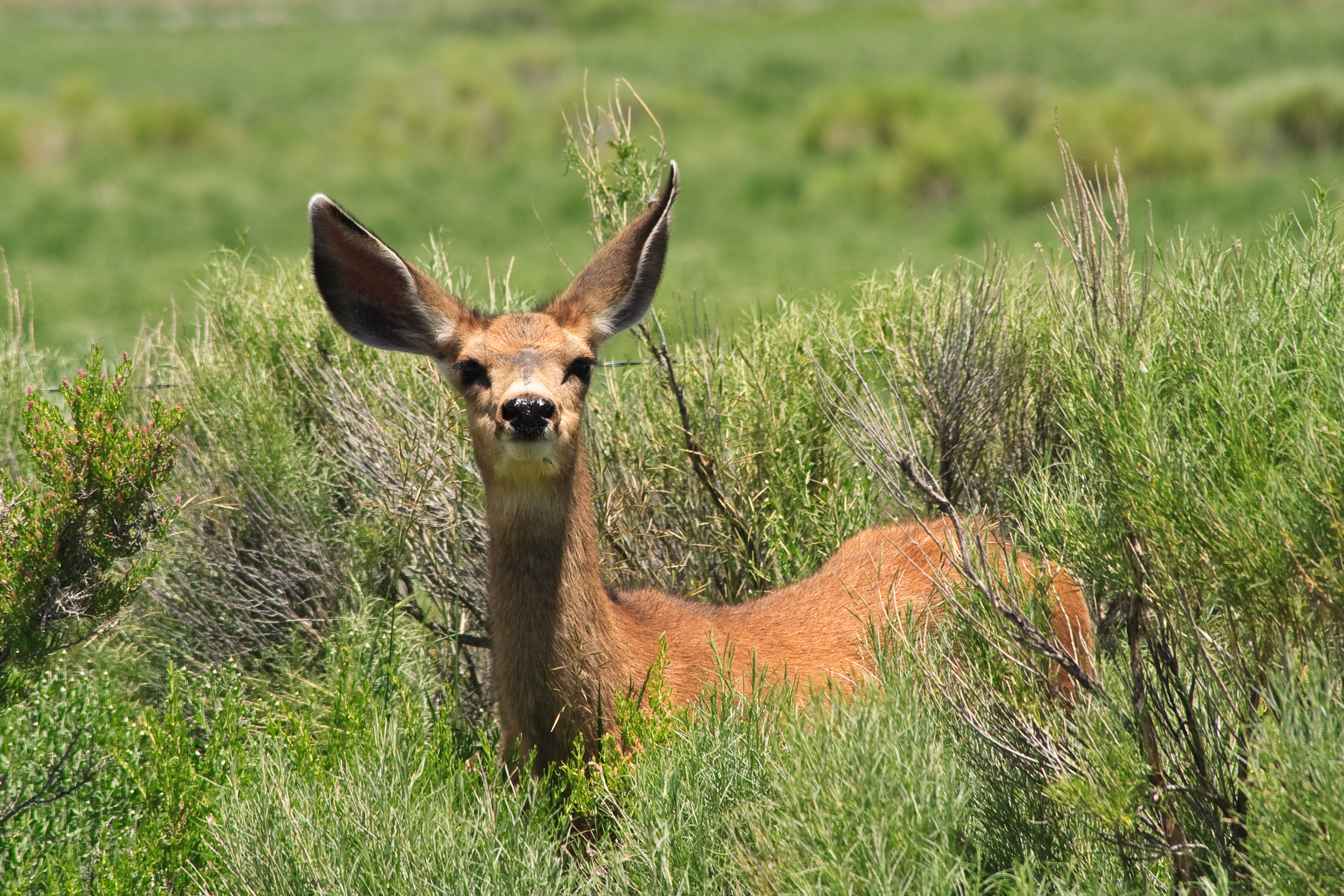
Mule deer rely on grasses and flowers in the high desert.

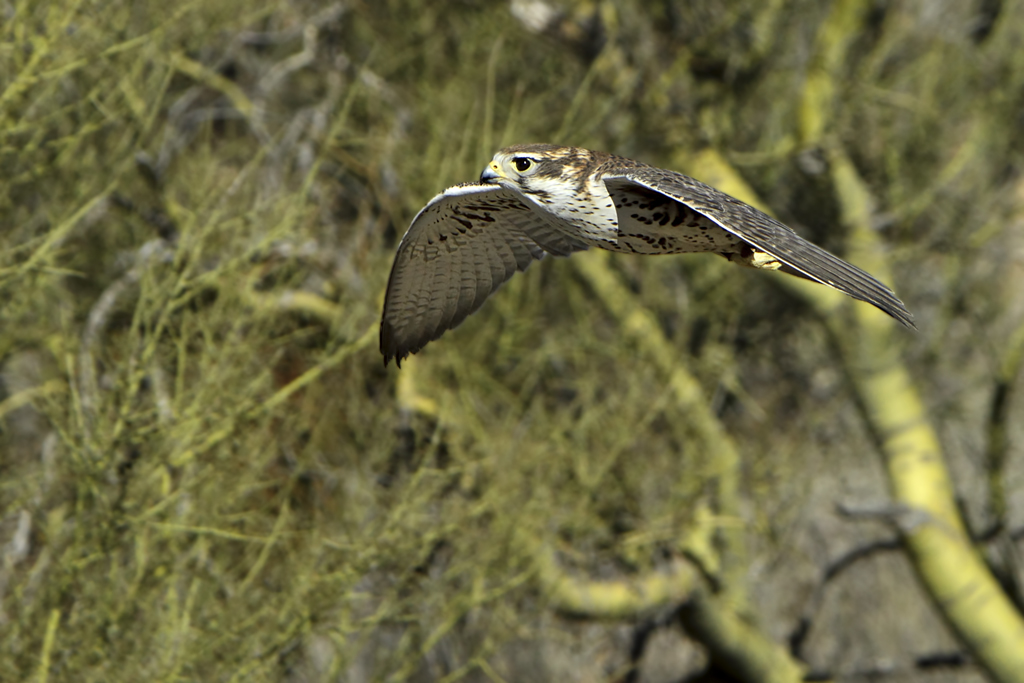
Prairie falcons live off of the region's abundance of small mammals.

The Oregon Badlands Wilderness, 15 miles (24 km) east of Bend, has vegetation typical of the high desert region. The native plants are adapted to survive on less than 12 inches (300 mm) of rain per year. The area is dominated by big sagebrush and rabbitbrush along with hardy grasses like Idaho fescue, bluebunch wheatgrass, and bunchgrass. In the spring, there are native wildflowers such as yellow Oregon sunshine, dwarf purple monkeyflower, sulfur buckwheat, Indian paintbrush, and mariposa lilies. Other high desert wildflowers common throughout the region include buttercups, larkspur, phlox, primroses, and coral mallow. The Oregon Badlands Wilderness also contains the oldest known tree in Oregon, a western juniper estimated to be more than 1,600 years old.

Hundreds of animal species are found in Oregon's high desert environment. In the Hart Mountain National Antelope Refuge alone, there are over 300, including 239 bird species and 42 mammals. Throughout the high desert region, mule deer, pronghorn, coyotes, American badgers, and black-tailed jackrabbits are common. Elk, bighorn sheep, cougars, bobcats, gray foxes, red foxes, North American porcupines, and North American beavers are also found in some parts of the high desert.

Smaller mammals native to the area include long-tailed weasels, woodchucks, cottontail rabbits, pygmy rabbits, golden-mantled ground squirrels, antelope squirrels, Townsend's ground squirrels, yellow-pine chipmunks, Ord's kangaroo rats, and northern pocket gophers. Mice species include Great Basin pocket mouse, northern grasshopper mouse, western harvest mouse, deer mouse, meadow mouse, and creeping vole. There are also numerous bat species that live in Oregon's high desert country.

Common high desert birds include sage-grouse, quail, and sage thrasher. Near high desert lakes and in riparian areas, there are American dusky flycatchers, yellow warblers, orange-crowned warblers, house wrens, spotted towhees, Brewer's blackbirds, western meadowlarks, swallows, and nighthawks. Mountain chickadees, Cassin's finches, black-headed grosbeaks, green-tailed towhees, yellow-rumped warblers, MacGillivray's warblers, mountain bluebirds, common ravens, northern flickers, and white-headed woodpeckers are common in parts of the region. Birds of prey include owls, hawks, prairie falcons, golden eagles, and bald eagles.

Several snakes can be found here, including the Great Basin rattlesnake, Great Basin gopher snake (Pituophis catenifer deserticola), Northern Rubber Boa, and the Striped whipsnake. Lizards that can be found here include the Desert collared lizard, Western fence lizard, Long-nosed leopard lizard, and the Desert horned lizard. There are no turtles or tortoises native to this area.

Common amphibians in the area include the Pacific tree frog and the Great Basin spadefoot toad. There are no native salamanders or newts to this area.

This area is home to several species of arachnids, including the Northern scorpion, Western black widow, and the banded garden spider.

== History ==
=== Native peoples and Euro-American settlement ===
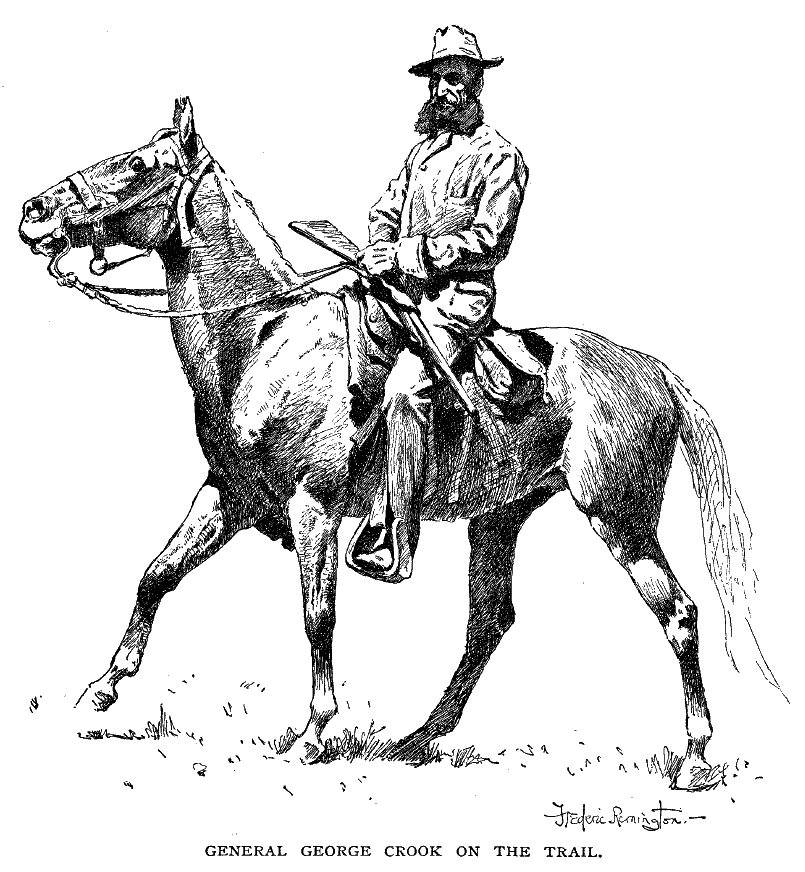
Maj. Gen. George Crook of the U.S. Army moved Camp Warner from Hart Mountain to a site west of the Warner Lakes in 1867.

The indigenous people of the high desert region are the Northern Paiute people. These Native Americans were once semi-nomadic hunter-gatherers who relied on nuts, roots, seeds, berries, eggs, and animals such as deer, pronghorn, geese, quail, rabbits, and bear, following their food to high and low elevations depending on the time of year. They make sandals, traps, fishing nets, and weave baskets. Made out of sagebrush, willow, tule plant, Indian hemp, and sumac fibers, the baskets are tight enough to carry water. Archaeological evidence from near Fort Rock has shown that people wove baskets in the area at least 9,000 years ago.

Throughout the 18th century and into the early 19th century, the Northern Paiute had numerous conflicts with tribes who lived to the northwest. The Wasco-Wishram and other Chinook tribes often encroached on the high desert landscape of the Northern Paiute territory. After one such incident in 1811, the Northern Paiute migrated north to the Columbia River and attacked Wasco canoes. Around this time, the Northern Paiute numbered approximately 7,500. The Snake War, a war between the natives and Euro-American settlers in the region in the 1860s, killed roughly two-thirds of the Northern Paiute population. The settlers won the war and then set aside the Malheur Reservation for the Northern Paiute and other Oregon Native American tribes.

Settlers who had traveled to Oregon along the Oregon Trail began to live in the high desert region in the 1850s and 1860s after they had begun farming and logging in the Willamette Valley and other lands in western Oregon. Thousands of these emigrants reached the area from the west, crossing the Cascade Range to make land claims in eastern Oregon. The high desert area was settled by Euro-Americans later than western Oregon was in part because of Elijah White's failure to find a pass east through the Cascades. Once they had claimed more land, pioneers and members of the American government negotiated treaties with natives in the high desert and elsewhere in Oregon, often forcing them off their native lands and onto reservations.

In 1866, American soldiers established Camp Warner, a military camp near present-day Hart Mountain National Antelope Refuge in Lake County. They were sent from Boise, Idaho, to build a military camp in the high desert, and they built it east of the Warner Lakes because they doubted that they could cross the series of wetlands. Maj. Gen. George Crook disapproved of the soldiers' decision. He built a road across the lakes and moved the camp to the western side of them.

Of the five major cities in the high desert, Prineville was established earliest. Its post office originally opened under the name "Prine" in 1871. It was named for Barney Prine, a whisky and metal merchant in the area. Lakeview's post office was then established in 1876. At that time, Goose Lake was larger, and it was visible from the post office. The Burns post office opened in 1884 and the city was established in 1891. It was named for the Scottish poet Robert Burns. Bend's name was derived from the phrase "Farewell Bend," the location where pioneers traveling through the area last saw the Deschutes River. The Bend post office was established in 1904. Redmond, named after pioneering school teachers Frank and Josephine Redmond, was incorporated in 1910.

In 1878, the Bannock people and northern Shoshone tribes participated in the Bannock War, a war against Euro-American settlers in the region over the destruction of camas root—a major source of food for the natives—by settlers' hogs. The Bannock and the Northern Paiute suffered from violence during the conflict, and once the settlers had won the war, the natives were allotted to various reservations. The Northern Paiute were sent to the Yakama Indian Reservation and in later years have been dispersed throughout several reservations in the western United States.

Euro-American settlers created the 13,736-acre (5,559 ha) Burns Paiute Reservation, just north of Burns, in 1897. The reservation was established in 1972. It is home to the descendants of the Wada Tika band of Northern Paiutes. As of 1992, it had 356 members. As of 1980, there were 57 descendants of the Northern Paiute tribe living outside of the reservation.

=== Place names ===
In the 19th century, Oregon's high desert area was called the Great Sandy Desert (a misnomer, as there is very little sand in the region), the Rolling Sage Plain, and the Artemisia Desert. Over the years, the region has also been known as Oregon's Empty Quarter, the Great Wide Open, and Oregon's Cowboy Country. Today, many local residents call it the Oregon Outback. However, the old names are occasionally still used. A 1996 National Geographic magazine "Map of the United States Physical Landscape" used the pioneer name, Great Sandy Desert, to identify the southeastern quarter of Oregon. However, the region is most commonly known as Oregon's "High Desert". "High Desert" is the official name for a plain in Deschutes County, as recognized by the United States Board on Geographic Names. Variant names for the high desert are "Great Sandy Desert" and "Rolling Sage Plains".

== See also ==
- Columbia Plateau
- Northern Basin and Range (ecoregion)
- Oregon High Desert Grotto

== Works cited ==
- — "Oregon: A Geologic History". Oregon Department of Geology and Mineral Industries. Archived from the original on May 7, 2012.
- Bancroft, Hubert H.; Victor, Frances F. (1886). History of Oregon. The Works of Hubert Howe Bancroft. Vol. 1. San Francisco, California: The History Company. ISBN 0-665-14180-7. OCLC 9475552.
- Brogan, Phil F. (1964). East of the Cascades. Portland, Oregon: Binfords and Mort. OCLC 2018809.
- Engeman, Richard H. (2009). The Oregon Companion. Portland, Oregon: Timber Press. ISBN 978-0-88192-899-0. OCLC 236142647.
- Gall, Timothy L. (2009). Worldmark Encyclopedia of Cultures and Daily Life: Americas (2nd ed.). Detroit, Michigan: Gale. ISBN 978-1-4144-4890-9. OCLC 624435966.
- Jackman, E. R.; Long, R. A. (2003) [1964]. The Oregon Desert. Caldwell, Idaho: Caxton Press. ISBN 978-0-87004-434-2. OCLC 1353110.
- Kessel, William B.; Wooster, Robert (2005). Encyclopedia of Native American Wars and Warfare. New York, New York: Facts on File. ISBN 0-8160-3337-4. OCLC 44509237.
- McArthur, Lewis A.; McArthur, Lewis L. (2003) [1928]. Oregon Geographic Names (7th ed.). Portland, Oregon: Oregon Historical Society Press. ISBN 978-0875952772.
- Moir, William H.; Franklin, Jerry F.; Maser, Chris (1973). "Lost Forest Research Natural Area" (PDF). U.S. Forest Service. Archived from the original (PDF) on October 13, 2012.
- Pritzker, Barry M. (2000). A Native American Encyclopedia: History, Culture, and Peoples. New York, New York: Oxford University Press. ISBN 978-0-19-513877-1. OCLC 42683042.
- Rakestraw, John (2007). Birding Oregon. Guilford, Connecticut: Falcon. ISBN 978-0-7627-3913-4. OCLC 65165451.
- Ruby, Robert H.; Brown, John A. (1992). A Guide to the Indian Tribes of the Pacific Northwest (Revised ed.). Norman, Oklahoma: University of Oklahoma Press. ISBN 0-8061-2479-2. OCLC 463986877.
- Snipp, C. Matthew (1989). American Indians: The First of This Land. New York, New York: Russell Sage Foundation. ISBN 978-0-87154-822-1. OCLC 19670797.
- Souchie, Minerva T. (1991). "The End of a Way of Life: The Burns Paiute Indian Tribe". The First Oregonians. Portland, Oregon: Oregon Council for the Humanities. ISBN 1-880377-00-4. OCLC 28377310.
