= Prineville Lake Acres, Oregon =

- Census-designated place
- Location within Oregon Location within the United States
- Coordinates: 44°10′5″N 120°47′23″W
- Country: United States
- State: Oregon
- County: Crook

Area
  - Total: 6.59 sq mi (17.07 km^{2})
  - Land: 6.59 sq mi (17.07 km^{2})
  - Water: 0 sq mi (0.00 km^{2})
- Elevation: 3,820 ft (1,160 m)

Population (2020)
  - Total: 1,556
  - Density: 236.1/sq mi (91.14/km^{2})
- Time zone: UTC-8 (Pacific (PST))
  - Summer (DST): UTC-7 (PDT)
- ZIP Code: 97754 (Prineville)
- Area codes: 541/458
- FIPS code: 41-59916
- GNIS feature ID: 2812878

Prineville Lake Acres is a census-designated place (CDP) in Crook County, Oregon, United States. It was first listed as a CDP prior to the 2020 census. As of the 2020 census, Prineville Lake Acres had a population of 1,556.

The CDP is in western Crook County, 12 miles (19 km) southeast of Prineville, the county seat. It is surrounded by the Juniper Canyon CDP.

== Demographics ==
Historical population
Census	Pop.	Note	%±
2020	1,556		—
U.S. Decennial Census

== Education ==
All of the county is in the Crook County School District. All of Crook County is zoned to Crook County High School.

Crook County is in the boundary of Central Oregon Community College.
