= KRCO =

KRCO may refer to:

- KRCO (AM), a radio station (690 AM) licensed to serve Prineville, Oregon, United States
- KRCO-FM, a radio station (95.7 FM) licensed to serve Prineville, Oregon
