= Juniper Canyon, Oregon =

- Census-designated place
- Location within Oregon Location within the United States
- Coordinates: 44°11′38″N 120°45′34″W
- Country: United States
- State: Oregon
- County: Crook

Area
  - Total: 96.33 sq mi (249.49 km^{2})
  - Land: 94.11 sq mi (243.74 km^{2})
  - Water: 2.22 sq mi (5.75 km^{2})
- Elevation: 3,840 ft (1,170 m)

Population (2020)
  - Total: 2,564
  - Density: 27.2/sq mi (10.52/km^{2})
- Time zone: UTC-8 (Pacific (PST))
  - Summer (DST): UTC-7 (PDT)
- ZIP Code: 97754 (Prineville)
- Area codes: 541/458
- FIPS code: 41-38075
- GNIS feature ID: 2805453

Juniper Canyon is a census-designated place (CDP) in Crook County, Oregon, United States. It was first listed as a CDP in the 2020 census. As of the 2020 census, Juniper Canyon had a population of 2,564.

The CDP is an area of low-density housing in western Crook County, bordered to the northwest by the city of Prineville, the county seat. The CDP is bordered to the west by Oregon Route 27, to the north and east by Oregon Route 380, and to the south by Prineville Reservoir on the Crooked River, a northwest-flowing tributary of the Deschutes River. Juniper Canyon Road crosses the CDP from just outside Prineville in the northwest to its end at Prineville Reservoir State Park in the southeast.

The Juniper Canyon CDP fully encloses the CDP of Prineville Lake Acres.

== Demographics ==
Historical population
Census	Pop.	Note	%±
2020	2,564		—
U.S. Decennial Census

== Education ==
All of the county is in the Crook County School District. All of Crook County is zoned to Crook County High School.

Crook County is in the boundary of Central Oregon Community College.
