= High Desert Christian Academy =

Christian school in Prineville, Oregon, United States

Location
- 310 Northeast 7th Street; Prineville, Oregon, (Crook County) 97754; United States

Information
- Type: Private Christian
- Motto: "The Heart of Education is Education of the Heart"
- Opened: 1994
- Principal: Cherylann Dozier
- Grades: Pre K-12
- Colors: Purple, black, and silver
- Mascot: Warriors
- Accreditation: Cognia
- Website: "hdchristianacademy.com".

High Desert Christian Academy (HDCA) (formerly known as Crook County Christian School), is a private nondenominational Christian school located in Prineville, Oregon, United States. As of 2017, the school is accredited through AdvancEd (Cognia).

== History ==
Crook County Christian School
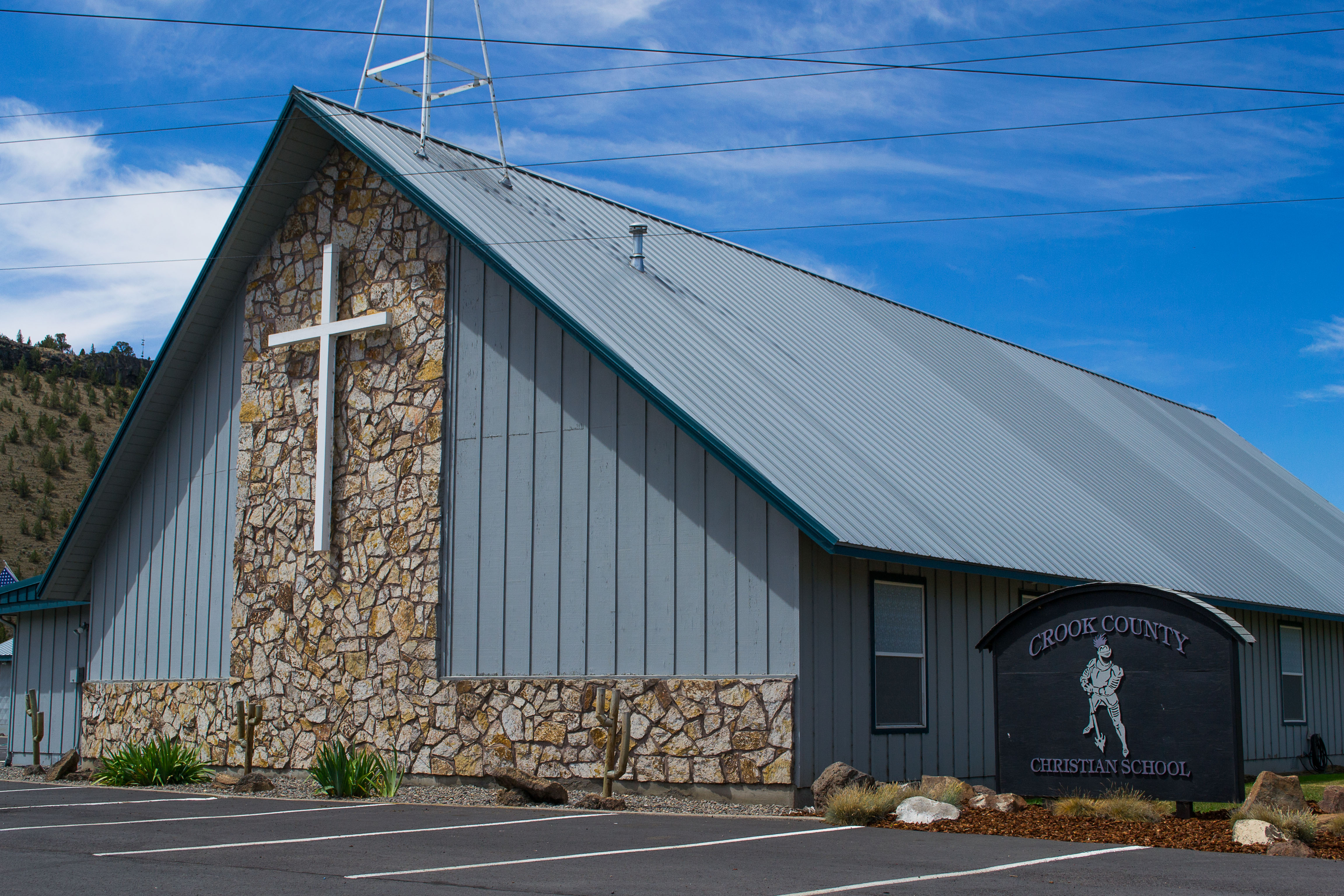

Location
- 839 S Main Street; Prineville, Oregon, (Crook County); United States; 44.2943°N 120.8476°W

Information
- Type: Private Christian
- Opened: 1994
- Grades: Pre K-8
- Colors: Purple, black, and silver
- Athletics conference: OSAA Big Sky League 1A-6
- Mascot: Warriors
- Accreditation: ACSI, NAAS
- Website: www.crookcountychristianschool.com

The school was founded originally under the name Crook County Christian School (CCCS) in 1994, affiliated with the Assembly of God church in Prineville. The school was previously a member of the Association of Christian Schools International. It was accredited through the Northwest Association of Accredited Schools since 2000.

The school reported growth in 2004 prompting the construction of a second two-story building on the property to house additional classrooms and bathrooms.

The CCCS' high school classes were almost closed in 2009, but remained open for the 2009 to 2010 school year. In 2010, the school's high school curriculum was discontinued, and with it, its accreditation. CCCS' staff did continue to offer tutoring to high school students enrolled to the online high school program, Insight School of Oregon. CCCS' own high school program remained closed for the next 5 years.

As of 2013, the school had grades K through 8.

In 2015, the school formally separated from the Assembly of God church into its own nonprofit 501(c)(3) organization and formed its own school board. It was at this time that the school's name was changed from CCCS to High Desert Christian Academy (HDCA). After the separation, the school continued to operate from the same location on the church's property, using the same buildings and land as it had prior to the separation, but now operated under a lease agreement with the church.

HDCA reopened its high school program in 2015 following its separation from the Assembly of God church. The school later became reaccredited through AdvancEd (Cognia) in 2017.

HDCA leased the school property from the Assembly of God church from 2015 to 2022. The lease agreement was not renewed at the close of the school year in 2022, so the school changed locations. For the 2022-2023 school year, HDCA operated from three separate churches in Prineville: Eastside Church, Calvary Baptist Church, and Grace Baptist Church.

In March 2023, HDCA announced the purchase of the Pioneer Memorial Hospital in Prineville, the city’s former hospital from 1950-2015. The school prepared during 2023 to use the hospital site as its new school campus starting in the 2023-2024 school year.

As of May 2024 the school roll is 108.

== See also ==
- Crook County School District
- Crook County High School
