= Ochoco Creek =

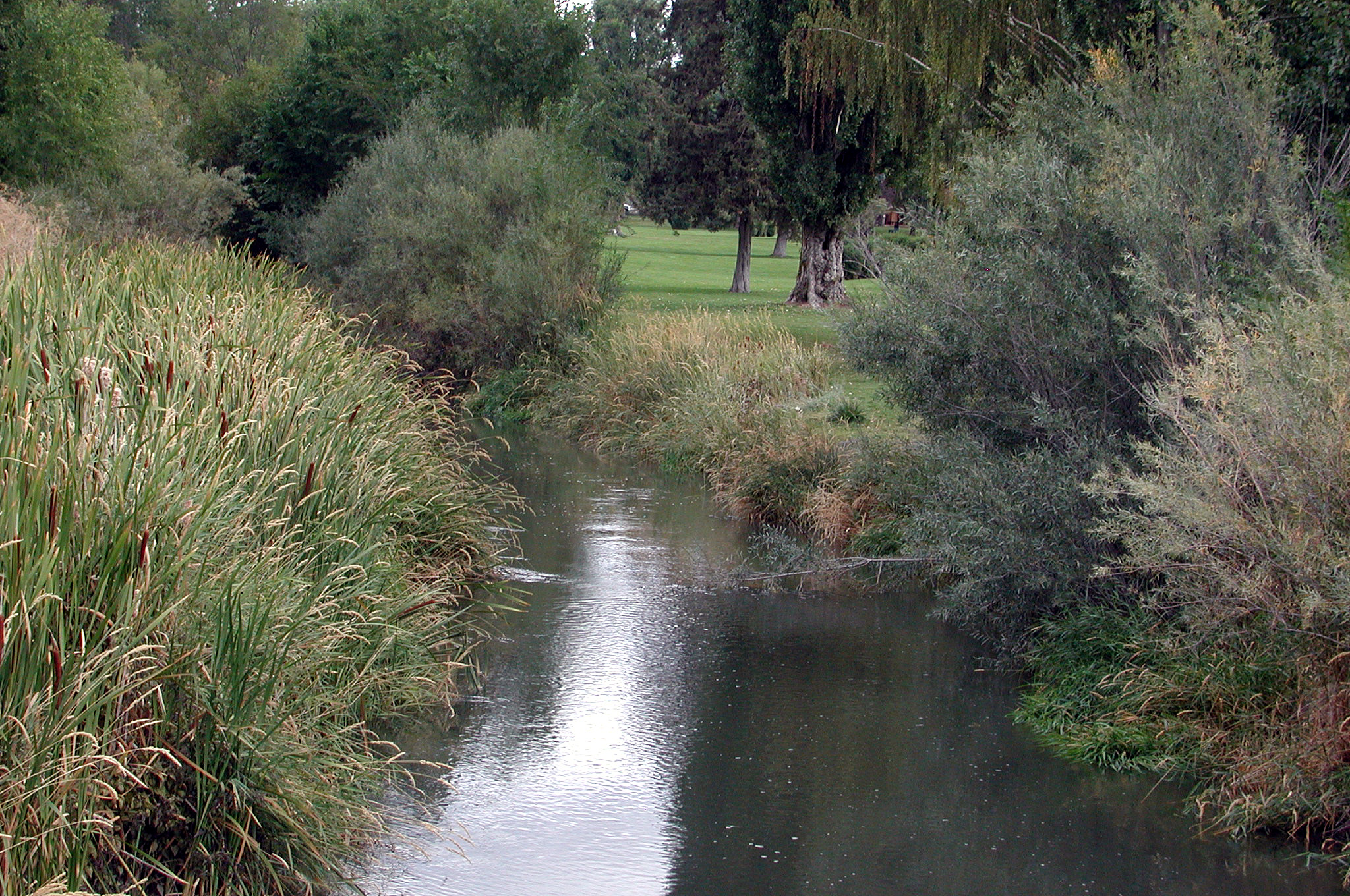
- Ochoco Creek Park in Prineville

- Location of the mouth of Ochoco Creek in Oregon
- Etymology: Named for a Northern Paiute leader of the 19th century

Location
- Country: United States
- State: Oregon
- County: Crook County and Wheeler County

Physical characteristics
- Source: near Ochoco Spring
  - location: Ochoco National Forest, Wheeler County, Oregon
  - coordinates: 44°26′51″N 120°19′38″W
  - elevation: 5,428 ft (1,654 m)
- Mouth: Crooked River
  - location: Prineville, Crook County, Oregon
  - coordinates: 44°19′19″N 120°53′28″W
  - elevation: 2,838 ft (865 m)
- Length: 30 mi (48 km)
- Discharge
  - minimum: 1 cu ft/s (0.028 m^{3}/s)

Ochoco Creek (/ˈoʊtʃəkoʊ/ OH-chə-koh;) is a 30-mile (48 km) tributary of the Crooked River in the U.S. state of Oregon. Part of the drainage basin of the Columbia River, it arises in the Ochoco National Forest in Wheeler County and flows generally southwest and west for most of its length through Crook County to slightly northwest of Prineville.

== Course ==
Ochoco Creek begins in the extreme southwestern corner of Wheeler County near its border with Crook County in the Ochoco National Forest. Entering Crook County, it flows southwest for about two-thirds of its course, roughly parallel to Forest Road 22 and U.S. Route 26 to the Crooked River near Prineville.

In its first 5 miles (8.0 km), Ochoco Creek receives Camp Creek from the left then Aholt and McAllister creeks, both from the right, then Judy, Fisher, and Canyon creeks, all from the left. At about river mile (RM) 25 or river kilometer (RK 40), Coyle Creek and then Metal Creek enter from the right. Between there and the Ochoco Reservoir and Ochoco Lake State Park, the creek receives Garden Creek from the right, Douthit, Duncan, and Wolf creeks and Camp Branch, all from the left, and Salmon Creek from the right. Leaving the national forest, it receives Veasle and Lawson creeks from the left and Polly Creek from the right before entering the reservoir. As part of the lake, it receives Mill Creek from the right at about RM 12 (RK 19).

Flowing west from the lower end of the lake at about RM 9 (RK 14), the creek runs through the Prineville Golf and Country Club, passes under Highway 26 and enters Prineville and Ochoco Creek Park north of the highway at about RM 4 (RK 6). Turning northwest out of Prineville, the stream soon passes under Highway 26 again and enters the Crooked River roughly 47 miles (76 km) from its confluence with the Deschutes River, a tributary of the Columbia River.

== See also ==
- List of rivers in Oregon
