= Brothers School District =

Former school district in Oregon, United States

Location
- Brothers, Oregon, 97712; United States

District information
- Type: Public
- Established: 1915
- Closed: 2006
- Schools: 1

Students and staff
- Teachers: 1

Brothers School District 15C was a school district headquartered in Brothers, Oregon. It had one school, the Brothers School, a one room schoolhouse. In 1991, the school had one teacher. The school was a K-8 school.

As of 2025 Brothers Elementary School, a K-8 school, is operated by the Crook County School District.

== History ==
The school first opened in 1915. At the time, enrollment was 11.

A school building, colored red, opened in 1928.

In 1969 it had eight students.

Circa 1989, the state government sent a team for standardizing schools, and it gave a poor rating to the school district. The district decided to change by using a new building that had the highest level technology of the era; previously it had slower network connections. In 2001 it had 18 students. By then the school had faster internet and CD-ROM facilities.

By 1991, Senate Bill 917, which mandated school district consolidation by 1996, meant that the district would possibly be forced to merge into another district. In 1991, The Bulletin reported that area community members did not like the idea of losing control of their school. In 1991 there was a petition circulated that opposed forced mergers.

Circa 2000, the school had 18 students, and at one time enrollment was 20. In March 2005, enrollment was three. In August 2005, it only had one student, who lived in the Crook County School District but attended Brothers due to its greater proximity to its residence. As the school was threatened with closure, the school sought to find other students to attend. In order to save money, the school switched to a four day week. By 2005 the financial situation was deteriorating, and a lack of students would mean the closure of the school.

The school was unable to find additional students to attend, and the sole teacher resigned at the end of the 2004-2005 school year. In August 2005 the district had no employees, and that month, the High Desert Education Service District decided that Brothers school district would merge into the Crook County district effective May 2006. The chairperson of the Brothers school district board of trustees stated that, for the 2005-2006 school year, the school could still be used as a tutoring center for the lone student. The board of trustees of the Brothers district had selected the Crook County district as the place it would prefer if it was required to merge. The Brothers School closed in 2006. In 2007, one student who lived in the Brothers area went to a school in Prineville. However, the school reopened in 2015, this time operated by the Crook County School District.

== Operations ==
In 1991, the annual budget was under $200,000.

Due to the small administrative size, community members had more access to the board of education and employees compared to larger school districts.

== Campus ==
The school is on U.S. Highway 20. The 1929 building is in the front of the school campus.

By 1991 the school district had established a prefabricated building used as a teacher's residence. School board members and parents helped build the facility. In 2005 the school grounds had two main buildings, and took up about 33% of the downtown area of Brothers.

== Transportation ==
In 1991, the district had no transportation services.

== Feeder patterns ==
The district was the sole school district of its area, and it paid money to other districts to subsidize high school education for students at the high school level. Sometime before 1989, the area school district sent older students to Bend Senior High School of the Bend School District. Circa 1989, due to lower costs, it instead began sending older students to Crane Union High School. In 1991 Crane remained as the district's default choice, while some students instead chose to live with family members in other communities and attend high school there.

== See also ==
- List of school districts in Oregon
