= Ochoco Dam =

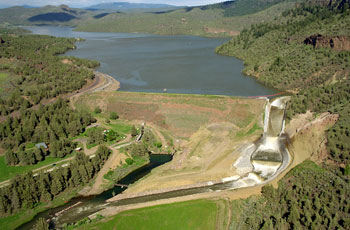
- Interactive map of Ochoco Dam
- Country: United States
- Location: Crook County, Oregon
- Coordinates: 44°17′56″N 120°43′27″W
- Status: Operational
- Opening date: 1920, rebuilt 1949

Dam and spillways
- Height: 152 ft (46 m)

Reservoir
- Creates: Ochoco Reservoir
- Total capacity: 39,000 acre⋅ft (48,000,000 m^{3})
- Normal elevation: 3,100 ft (945 m)

The Ochoco Dam is a dam in Central Oregon, 6 miles (9.7 km) east of Prineville in Crook County, Oregon, in the United States.

The dam impounds Ochoco Creek to create Ochoco Reservoir. The reservoir holds 39,000 acre-feet (48,000,000 m^{3}) of water for irrigation and flood control, and is also used for fishing and boating. The former Ochoco Lake State Park, with its 22 campsites and lake access, has been re-designated as a county park, and is now run by the Crook County Parks and Recreation District.

The original 1920 Ochoco Dam was privately built, 126 feet (38 m) high and 1,000 feet (300 m) long. Chronic leaking through its middle section posed a constant threat to the city of Prineville, close downstream, so the dam was replaced by the United States Bureau of Reclamation in 1949. The 1949 reconstruction brought the earthen dam to 152 feet (46 m) high. In the mid 1990s the reservoir was drained twice for additional safety retrofitting. Although the Bureau of Reclamation has been involved in much of the work here, title to the dam is held by the Ochoco Irrigation District.

In 1999, the dam was the subject of an April Fool's day hoax from radio station KSJJ, a hoax that the magazine Time listed among its '"Top 10 Shocking Hoaxes"', along with the balloon boy hoax, 1938 The War of the Worlds radio hoax, and the 2010 Georgian news report hoax.

== See also ==
- List of lakes in Oregon
