= Ochoco West, Oregon =

- Census-designated place
- Location within Oregon Location within the United States
- Coordinates: 44°24′11″N 120°55′15″W
- Country: United States
- State: Oregon
- County: Crook

Area
  - Total: 0.44 sq mi (1.14 km^{2})
  - Land: 0.44 sq mi (1.14 km^{2})
  - Water: 0 sq mi (0.00 km^{2})
- Elevation: 3,200 ft (980 m)

Population (2020)
  - Total: 432
  - Density: 983.6/sq mi (379.77/km^{2})
- Time zone: UTC-8 (Pacific (PST))
  - Summer (DST): UTC-7 (PDT)
- ZIP Code: 97754 (Prineville)
- Area codes: 541/458
- FIPS code: 41-54527
- GNIS feature ID: 2812877

Ochoco West is a census-designated place (CDP) in Crook County, Oregon, United States. It was first listed as a CDP prior to the 2020 census. As of the 2020 census, Ochoco West had a population of 432.

The CDP is in northwestern Crook County, 3 miles (5 km) northeast of U.S. Route 26, 10 miles (16 km) northwest of Prineville, the county seat, and 23 miles (37 km) southeast of Madras. The community is on the west side of the valley of Lytle Creek at the western foot of the Ochoco Mountains. Lytle Creek is a south-flowing tributary of the Crooked River and part of the Deschutes River watershed.

== Demographics ==
Historical population
| Census | Pop. | Note | %± |
|---|---|---|---|
| 2020 | 432 | | — |
U.S. Decennial Census

== Education ==
All of the county is in the Crook County School District. All of Crook County is zoned to Crook County High School.

Crook County is in the boundary of Central Oregon Community College.
