= Darrel Aschbacher =

American gridiron football player (1935–2023)

No. 50, 61
- Position: Guard

Personal information
- Born: June 2, 1935; Prineville, Oregon, U.S.
- Died: July 15, 2023 (aged 88)
- Listed height: 6 ft 1 in (1.85 m)
- Listed weight: 220 lb (100 kg)

Career information
- High school: Crook County (Prineville, Oregon)
- College: Boise; Oregon
- NFL draft: 1959: undrafted

Career history
- Philadelphia Eagles (1959); San Francisco 49ers (1960–1961); Saskatchewan Roughriders (1962); Montreal Alouettes (1963)*
- * Offseason or practice squad member only

Career NFL statistics
- Games played: 11
- Games started: 4
- Stats at Pro Football Reference

Career CFL statistics
- Games played: 12

Darrel Godsil Aschbacher (/ˈæʃbɑːkər/; June 2, 1935 – July 15, 2023) was an American professional football player who was a guard for one season in the National Football League (NFL) for the Philadelphia Eagles and one season in the Canadian Football League (CFL) for the Saskatchewan Roughriders. He played college football for the Boise State Broncos and Oregon Ducks and was signed by the Eagles as an undrafted free agent in 1959. He also was on the rosters of the San Francisco 49ers and Montreal Alouettes, but did not play.

== Early life and education ==
Darrel Godsil Aschbacher was born on June 2, 1935, in Prineville, Oregon. He attended Crook County High School near there, and was a member of their 1952 state championship football team.

Aschbacher first played college football for Boise Junior College (now Boise State University), being named all-conference. His coach called him "The kind of a guy that would consider playing in the Rose Bowl the highlight of his life ... he really likes to play. He is one of the most enthusiastic players it has even been my privilege to handle." Aschbacher transferred to the University of Oregon in 1957, earning a varsity letter in his first year with the team.

As a senior, he helped the team reach the 1958 Rose Bowl, losing to the Ohio State Buckeyes by three points.

== Professional career ==
Aschbacher went unselected in the 1959 NFL draft, being overlooked by every team. Philadelphia Eagles Hall of Fame quarterback Norm Van Brocklin persuaded the team to give him a tryout, and he made the final roster. Though a team spokesperson said he would be used as a defensive end, he ended up playing the guard position. Overall, in the 1959 season, he appeared in eleven games, starting four while splitting time with Gerry Huth. He wore number 50 with Philadelphia. He re-signed with them in July, but was released early in the 1960 season, missing the team's national championship.

After being released by the Eagles, Aschbacher was signed by the San Francisco 49ers, but was inactive for the entire season. He left the team on August 1, 1961, saying he wanted to return to his home in Prineville, Oregon. He then retired to become a commercial pilot, but returned in 1962 to play in the Canadian Football League (CFL) for the Saskatchewan Roughriders. Wearing number 61, Aschbacher appeared in twelve games with Saskatchewan. He was traded to the Montreal Alouettes in 1963, but requested a release and retired for a final time.

== Personal life and death ==
Aschbacher returned to being a commercial pilot after his stint in the CFL, serving with Delta Air Lines for three decades until retiring at age 60. He died on July 15, 2023, at the age of 88.
