= KLTW =

KLTW may refer to:

- KLTW (FM), a radio station (105.3 FM) licensed to serve Winnie, Texas, United States
- KRCO-FM, a radio station (95.7 FM) licensed to serve Prineville, Oregon, United States, which held the call sign KLTW-FM from 2003 to 2022
