= Pioneer Secondary Alternative High School =

Location
- 297 NE Holly Street; Prineville, Crook County, Oregon 97754; United States; 44.302727°N 120.838714°W

Information
- Type: Public
- School district: Crook County School District
- Principal: Brian Lemos
- Grades: 9-12
- Enrollment: 85 (2023–2024)
- Website: Pioneer Alternative HS website

Pioneer Secondary Alternative High School is a public alternative high school in Prineville, Oregon, United States.

== Academics ==
In 2008, 29% of the school's seniors received their high school diploma. Of 56 students, 16 graduated, 29 dropped out, and 11 are still in high school.
