= KBNW =

KBNW may refer to:

- KBNW (AM), a radio station (1340 AM) licensed to Bend, Oregon, United States
- KBNW-FM, a radio station (107.1 FM) licensed to Deer Park, Washington, United States
- the ICAO code for Boone Municipal Airport
