= KWPK-FM =

Coordinates: 44.078°N 121.331°W

- Sisters, Oregon; United States
- Broadcast area: Bend, Oregon
- Frequency: 104.1 MHz
- Branding: 104.1 The Peak

Programming
- Format: Modern AC
- Affiliations: Compass Media Networks; Premiere Networks; Westwood One

Ownership
- Owner: Horizon Broadcasting Group
- Sister stations: KQAK, KRCO, KRCO-FM

History
- First air date: 2001
- Former call signs: KPXA (1991–2001, CP)
- Call sign meaning: K W PeaK

Technical information
- Licensing authority: FCC
- Facility ID: 59365
- Class: C2
- ERP: 34,000 watts
- HAAT: 180 meters

Links
- Public license information: Public file; LMS
- Website: The Peak 1041

KWPK-FM (104.1 MHz) is a commercial modern adult contemporary music radio station in Sisters, Oregon, USA, broadcasting to the Bend, Oregon area.
