= Brothers, Oregon =

Unincorporated community in Deschutes County, Oregon

- Unincorporated community
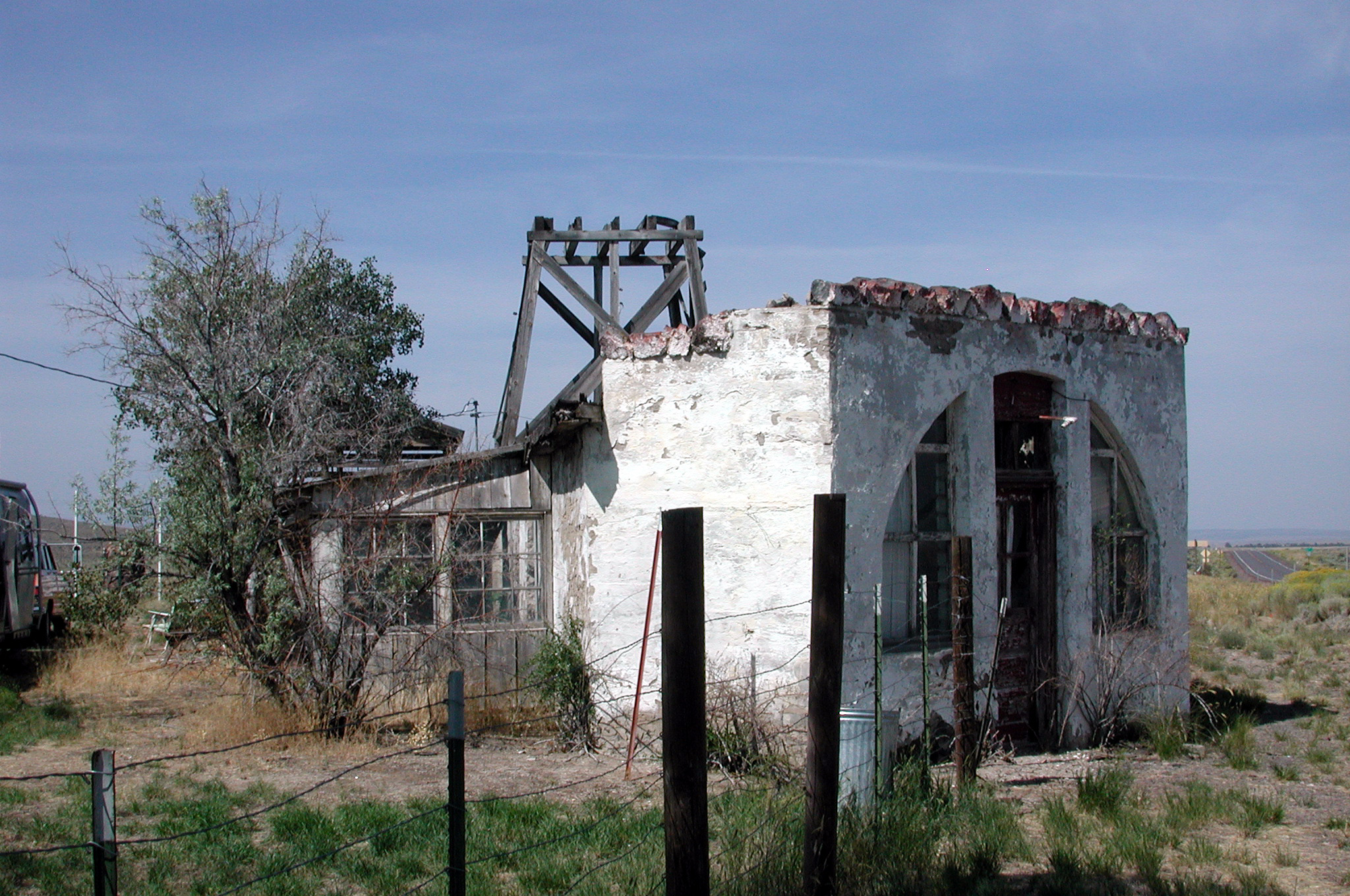
- Ruins in Brothers

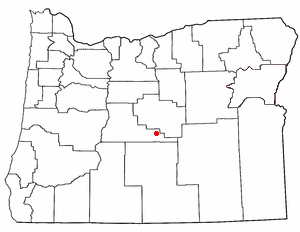
- Coordinates: 43°48′49″N 120°36′12″W
- Country: United States
- State: Oregon
- County: Deschutes
- Elevation: 4,639 ft (1,414 m)
- Time zone: UTC-8 (PST)
  - Summer (DST): UTC-7 (PDT)
- ZIP code: 97712
- Area codes: 458 and 541
- Coordinates and elevation from United States Geological Survey

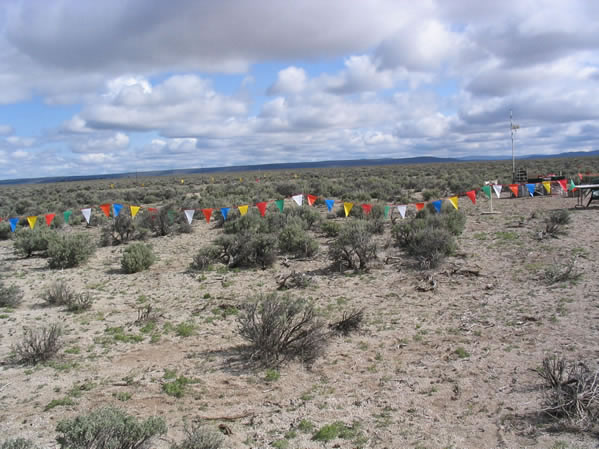
A row of colorful flags marks the model rocket launch range.

Brothers is an unincorporated community in Deschutes County, Oregon, United States on U.S. Route 20. It is part of the Bend, Oregon metropolitan statistical area. It lies at an elevation of 4,639 feet (1,414 m).

In 2005, the Associated Press described Brothers as "a speck of a town".

== History ==
Originally a stagecoach stop between Burns and Prineville, the Brothers Stage Stop was built in 1912. It was a gas station, restaurant, and post office up until around 2018. It has changed owners a few times over the years and is currently not in operation.

Brothers post office was established in 1913. One source says that the name comes from several families of brothers who settled in the area, including the Stenkamp Brothers and Varco(e) Brothers, while another notes that there was a local Three Brothers Sheep Camp, named for three nearby hills that had the Three Sisters mountains looming behind them. The wool trade around World War I helped the town develop.

Vast tracts of uninhabited land covered with sagebrush surround Brothers, which are often used for model and high power rocket launches by Oregon Rocketry which has one of the highest Federal Aviation Administration (FAA) airspace waivers in the United States at 35,500 feet (10,800 m).

== Climate ==
This region experiences warm and dry summers, with no average monthly temperatures above 71.6 °F (22.0 °C). According to the Köppen Climate Classification system, Brothers has a steppe climate, abbreviated "BSk" on climate maps.

Climate data for Brothers, Oregon, 1991–2020 normals, 1959-2020 extremes: 4640ft (1414m)
| Month | Jan | Feb | Mar | Apr | May | Jun | Jul | Aug | Sep | Oct | Nov | Dec | Year |
|---|---|---|---|---|---|---|---|---|---|---|---|---|---|
| Record high °F (°C) | 61 (16) | 67 (19) | 73 (23) | 85 (29) | 94 (34) | 96 (36) | 102 (39) | 103 (39) | 97 (36) | 88 (31) | 72 (22) | 61 (16) | 103 (39) |
| Mean maximum °F (°C) | 51.0 (10.6) | 54.8 (12.7) | 64.1 (17.8) | 74.1 (23.4) | 83.0 (28.3) | 87.9 (31.1) | 94.3 (34.6) | 93.4 (34.1) | 88.1 (31.2) | 77.7 (25.4) | 63.1 (17.3) | 50.3 (10.2) | 95.7 (35.4) |
| Mean daily maximum °F (°C) | 37.4 (3.0) | 40.0 (4.4) | 47.2 (8.4) | 54.3 (12.4) | 63.0 (17.2) | 70.6 (21.4) | 82.1 (27.8) | 81.4 (27.4) | 73.1 (22.8) | 59.6 (15.3) | 45.6 (7.6) | 36.6 (2.6) | 57.6 (14.2) |
| Daily mean °F (°C) | 27.7 (−2.4) | 30.1 (−1.1) | 34.6 (1.4) | 39.3 (4.1) | 47.4 (8.6) | 54.3 (12.4) | 63.4 (17.4) | 62.3 (16.8) | 54.7 (12.6) | 43.9 (6.6) | 33.4 (0.8) | 26.8 (−2.9) | 43.2 (6.2) |
| Mean daily minimum °F (°C) | 18.0 (−7.8) | 20.1 (−6.6) | 22.0 (−5.6) | 24.3 (−4.3) | 31.8 (−0.1) | 38.0 (3.3) | 44.7 (7.1) | 43.2 (6.2) | 36.3 (2.4) | 28.2 (−2.1) | 21.3 (−5.9) | 17.0 (−8.3) | 28.7 (−1.8) |
| Mean minimum °F (°C) | −0.7 (−18.2) | 1.5 (−16.9) | 10.6 (−11.9) | 13.4 (−10.3) | 16.9 (−8.4) | 24.1 (−4.4) | 30.4 (−0.9) | 29.3 (−1.5) | 20.8 (−6.2) | 13.9 (−10.1) | 4.1 (−15.5) | −2.8 (−19.3) | −9.0 (−22.8) |
| Record low °F (°C) | −30 (−34) | −19 (−28) | −10 (−23) | 1 (−17) | 8 (−13) | 12 (−11) | 18 (−8) | 20 (−7) | 10 (−12) | 1 (−17) | −16 (−27) | −30 (−34) | −30 (−34) |
| Average precipitation inches (mm) | 0.97 (25) | 0.66 (17) | 0.60 (15) | 0.57 (14) | 1.10 (28) | 0.78 (20) | 0.48 (12) | 0.42 (11) | 0.53 (13) | 0.62 (16) | 0.89 (23) | 1.48 (38) | 9.1 (232) |
| Average snowfall inches (cm) | 8.1 (21) | 4.0 (10) | 1.3 (3.3) | 0.8 (2.0) | 0.2 (0.51) | 0.0 (0.0) | 0.0 (0.0) | 0.0 (0.0) | 0.0 (0.0) | 0.3 (0.76) | 3.6 (9.1) | 6.7 (17) | 25 (63.67) |
Source 1: NOAA (1981-2010 precip/snowfall)
Source 2: XMACIS2 (records & 1981-2010 monthly max/mins)

Climate data for Brothers
| Month | Jan | Feb | Mar | Apr | May | Jun | Jul | Aug | Sep | Oct | Nov | Dec | Year |
|---|---|---|---|---|---|---|---|---|---|---|---|---|---|
| Record high °F (°C) | 61 (16) | 67 (19) | 73 (23) | 85 (29) | 92 (33) | 96 (36) | 102 (39) | 103 (39) | 97 (36) | 88 (31) | 72 (22) | 61 (16) | 103 (39) |
| Mean daily maximum °F (°C) | 37.6 (3.1) | 42.1 (5.6) | 48.1 (8.9) | 55.4 (13.0) | 63.9 (17.7) | 72.3 (22.4) | 82.4 (28.0) | 81 (27) | 73.1 (22.8) | 61.6 (16.4) | 45.8 (7.7) | 37.7 (3.2) | 58.4 (14.7) |
| Mean daily minimum °F (°C) | 17.2 (−8.2) | 20.3 (−6.5) | 22.5 (−5.3) | 24.9 (−3.9) | 31.2 (−0.4) | 37.6 (3.1) | 42.9 (6.1) | 41.6 (5.3) | 34.3 (1.3) | 28 (−2) | 22.3 (−5.4) | 17.1 (−8.3) | 28.3 (−2.1) |
| Record low °F (°C) | −30 (−34) | −19 (−28) | −10 (−23) | 1 (−17) | 8 (−13) | 12 (−11) | 18 (−8) | 20 (−7) | 10 (−12) | 1 (−17) | −16 (−27) | −30 (−34) | −30 (−34) |
| Average precipitation inches (mm) | 0.94 (24) | 0.48 (12) | 0.57 (14) | 0.63 (16) | 1.06 (27) | 0.9 (23) | 0.52 (13) | 0.57 (14) | 0.47 (12) | 0.67 (17) | 1.1 (28) | 1.08 (27) | 8.99 (228) |
| Average snowfall inches (cm) | 7.7 (20) | 3.1 (7.9) | 2.4 (6.1) | 1.5 (3.8) | 0.6 (1.5) | 0 (0) | 0 (0) | 0 (0) | 0 (0) | 0.6 (1.5) | 3.4 (8.6) | 6.9 (18) | 26.2 (67) |
| Average precipitation days | 6 | 6 | 6 | 6 | 6 | 5 | 3 | 3 | 3 | 5 | 7 | 7 | 63 |

== Transportation ==
Brothers is a stop on the Eastern POINT intercity bus line between Bend and Ontario. It makes one stop per day in each direction.

== Education ==
Brothers is currently in Crook County School District. It operates Brothers Elementary School, a K-8 school. The grounds include the current school building, a one room schoolhouse, as well as the former school, used for storage. The school has a teachers' residence and relies on a well. In 2023, it had a four-day school week, with two teachers alternating days. In 2023, its student count was six.

The community was previously in the Brothers School District, which operated a K-8 school. Sometime before 1989, the Brothers school district sent older students to Bend Senior High School of the Bend School District. Circa 1989, due to lower costs, it instead began sending older students to Crane Union High School, which had and has boarding facilities. In 1991, Crane remained as the district's default choice, while some students instead chose to live with family members in other communities and attended high school there. Due to a loss of enrollment, effective 2006, the Brothers district was consolidated into the Crook County district. The Brothers School closed in 2006. In 2007, one student who lived in the Brothers area went to a school in Prineville. Brothers Elementary reopened in 2015, with 7 students in the 2016–2017 school year and 13 students in the 2017–2018 school year.

Deschutes County is in the boundary of Central Oregon Community College.

== See also ==
- Brothers Fault Zone
