= KQAK =

Radio station in Bend, Oregon

Coordinates: 44.078°N 121.331°W

- Bend, Oregon; United States
- Broadcast area: Bend, Oregon
- Frequency: 105.7 MHz (HD Radio)
- Branding: 105.7 KQAK

Programming
- Format: Classic hits
- Subchannels: HD2: News/Talk (KBNW simulcast); HD3: Sports (KRCO simulcast)
- Affiliations: Premiere Networks; United Stations Radio Networks

Ownership
- Owner: Horizon Broadcasting Group
- Sister stations: KRCO, KRCO-FM, KWPK-FM

History
- First air date: September 5, 1986 (as KWBX)
- Former call signs: KJII (1984–1986, CP); KWBX (1986–1990)
- Call sign meaning: K QuAcK

Technical information
- Licensing authority: FCC
- Facility ID: 31175
- Class: C1
- ERP: 40,000 watts
- HAAT: 180 meters
- Translator: HD3: 92.5 K223DJ (Bend)

Links
- Public license information: Public file; LMS
- Website: kqak.com

KQAK (105.7 FM) is a commercial classic hits music radio station in Bend, Oregon.

== History of the KQAK call sign ==
KQAK was the Federal Communications Commission (FCC) call sign of a now defunct classic rock—and, more memorably, new wave/punk/gothic/ska—radio station, "The Quake," in San Francisco, California. See KSOL-FM under the history section for more information.

== 105.7 FM history ==
The station signed on the air on September 5, 1986 as KWBX with a classical music format, simulcasting KWAX 91.1 FM Eugene. They changed their call letters to the current KQAK and switched to an oldies format on October 19, 1990.
