= Barney Prine =

American pioneer

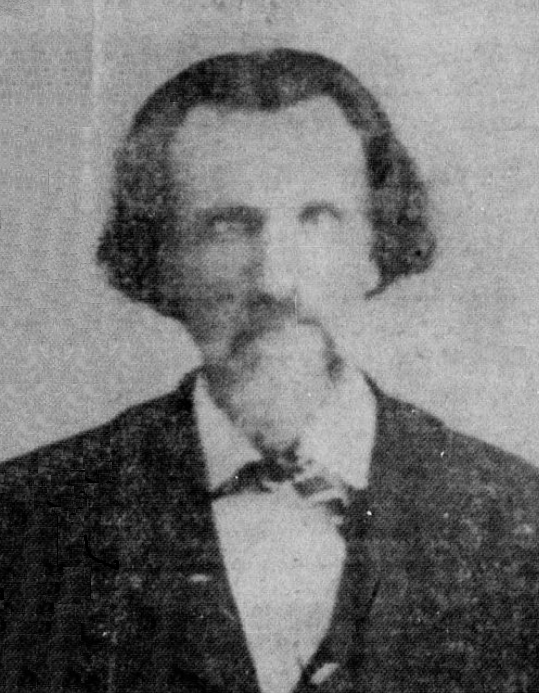
- Central Oregon pioneer Barney Prine
- Born: Francis Barnett Prine; January 1, 1841; Jackson County, Missouri, US
- Died: March 17, 1919 (aged 78); Lapwai, Idaho, US
- Occupations: Blacksmith, merchant, and city marshal
- Known for: Founding Prineville, Oregon

Francis Barnett Prine (known as Barney Prine) was an American pioneer who was one of the first settlers to homestead in the Ochoco country of central Oregon. When he was young, Prine traveled with his family from Missouri to Oregon's Willamette Valley over the Oregon Trail. He served in the 1st Oregon Volunteer Infantry Regiment during the American Civil War. Prine later moved to the Central Oregon, where he established several businesses in what became Prineville, Oregon, a town named in his honor.

== Early life ==
Prine was born on 1 January 1841 in Jackson County, Missouri, 12 miles (19 km) east of Kansas City. His parents were Francis "Frank" Prine and Alice Elizabeth "Elsie" (née Dealy) Prine. In 1853, Prine's family left Missouri for Oregon. Prine was only 12 years old, but he drove one of the family's wagons and took his turn standing guard at night while crossing the plains and mountains along the Oregon Trail.

The Prine family settled in Linn County in Oregon's Willamette Valley. The family established a farm approximately 6 miles (9.7 km) from Scio, Oregon, near the place where the north and south forks of the Santiam River merge. Prine attended school near Scio. As a youth, he made spending money winning foot races against other boys. At least one of his races was reported in local newspapers. His record-breaking mile run was still remembered and cited in a newspaper article three decades later.

In 1862, Prine took up a gold mining claim near Florence on the Oregon Coast. His claim was very productive, but Prine spent everything he made. He admitted to spending as much a $1,000 in a single day, gambling and buying drinks for his friends.

During the American Civil War, Prine supported the Union, serving in Company F of the 1st Oregon Volunteer Infantry Regiment. He entered the United States Army in November 1864 and served until his company was disbanded in July 1866. His company was commanded by Captain Ebner W. Waters. During his service, Prine was recognized as an outstanding soldier and was promoted to corporal. In addition, he regularly won money from fellow soldiers in foot races, which he never lost.

After being released from the Army, Prine returned to Linn County. In 1867, he married Elizabeth "Eliza" Sylvester. He remained in Linn County until the area became too crowded for his liking.

== Central Oregon pioneer ==
In 1868, he moved east of the Cascade Mountains to the Ochoco country of central Oregon. He made a squatters claim on property along the Crooked River, near Mill Creek. He was 27 years old at that time. His wife was one of the first women to settle in the area. Their first son was born at their homestead site a year later.

When he arrived in central Oregon, Prine built a crude cabin using juniper and willow logs, topped with a thatched roof of willow stems and ryegrass turf. He also opened a primitive blacksmith shop and a small store. He hauled goods for his store from The Dalles on the Columbia River while he salvaged iron from abandoned wagons for his blacksmith shop. Prine later added a saloon and a stable to his property. After the stable was built, he began keeping race horses there. Eventually, he laid out a course along the river for horse racing. He regularly sponsored horse races to boost liquor sales at his saloon.

At that time, central Oregon was a wild frontier area without any formal law enforcement. According to Prine, property theft and murder were common. Prine noted that this problem was solved by lynching thieves and murderers.

In 1871, the Prine post office was established. Later that year, Prine sold his Crooked River property and businesses to Monroe Hodges for $25 and a packhorse. The following year, the name of the post office was changed to Prineville. After taking over Prine's businesses, Hodges platted the Prineville town site. Prineville became the county seat for Crook County when that county was created by the Oregon State Legislature in 1882.

After selling his property at the Prineville town site, Prine moved to Weston in northeastern Oregon. He became Weston's city marshal and later opened a blacksmith shop there. While visiting Boise, Idaho in 1876, Prine became a local hero by rescuing a young girl from a wagon being dragged by a team of runaway horses. Riding up next to the out-of-control wagon, he pulled the girl to safety just before the wagon crashed into a tree.

== Later life and legacy ==
In the mid-1890s, Prine began prospecting for gold in unsettled parts of eastern Oregon. He was particularly interested in finding the Lost Blue Bucket Mine, which he believed was located somewhere between the Owyhee River and the headwaters of the Crooked River. He later explored the mining country of northeastern Washington, northern Idaho, and southern parts of British Columbia.

Eventually, Prine settled in the small community of Lapwai in the Idaho Panhandle. Once again, he opened a blacksmith shop. He ran that business successfully for the next 20 years. Prine died in Lapwai on 17 March 1919.

Today, Prine is considered the founder of Prineville, Oregon. The city is still the county seat of Crook County.
