= Ochoco State Scenic Viewpoint =

State park in Oregon, United States

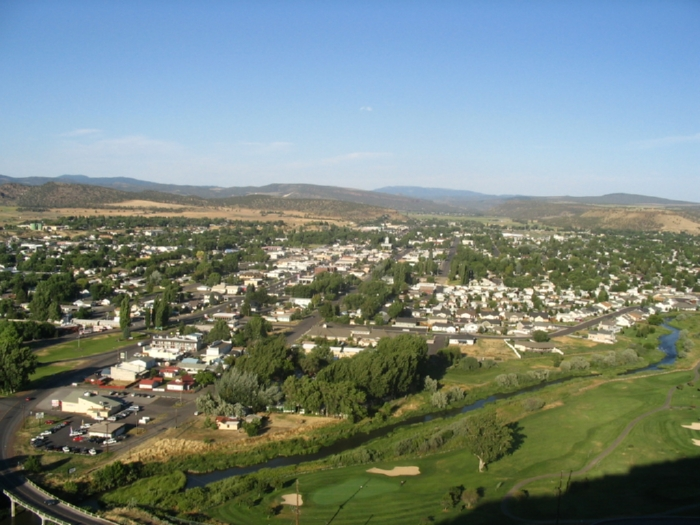
- View of Prineville from Ochoco State Scenic Viewpoint

- Location within Oregon Location within the United States
- Type: Public, state
- Location: Crook County, Oregon
- Nearest city: Prineville
- Coordinates: 44°17′58.47″N 120°52′13.63″W
- Operator: Oregon Parks and Recreation Department

Ochoco State Scenic Viewpoint is a state park in the U.S. state of Oregon, administered by the Oregon Parks and Recreation Department.

== See also ==
- List of Oregon state parks
