= KBNW (AM) =

- Bend, Oregon; United States
- Broadcast area: Bend, Oregon
- Frequency: 1340 kHz
- Branding: KBNW Talk

Programming
- Format: News–talk
- Affiliations: ABC News Radio; Compass Media Networks; Premiere Networks; Westwood One

Ownership
- Owner: Summit Broadcasting Group, LLC
- Operator: Horizon Broadcast Group

History
- First air date: August 29, 2008
- Call sign meaning: Bend Northwest

Technical information
- Licensing authority: FCC
- Facility ID: 160749
- Class: C
- Power: 1,000 watts day; 500 watts night
- Transmitter coordinates: 44°4′46.4″N 121°17′2.1″W
- Translator: 104.5 K283BH (Bend)
- Repeater: 105.7 KQAK-HD2 (Bend)

Links
- Public license information: Public file; LMS
- Webcast: Listen live
- Website: www.kbnwnews.com

KBNW (1340 AM) signed on the air August 29, 2008, broadcasting a news–talk format. Licensed to Bend, Oregon, United States, the station is owned by Summit Broadcasting Group, LLC (operated under a local marketing agreement by Horizon Broadcasting Group, LLC) and features programming from ABC News Radio, Compass Media Networks, Premiere Networks, and Westwood One, and is known as "News Radio KBNW".

Logo before translator sign on

== Translator ==
KBNW also broadcasts on the following translator:

Broadcast translator for KBNW
Call sign	Frequency	City of license	FID	ERP (W)	Class	FCC info
K283BH	104.5 FM	Bend, Oregon	27169	145	D	LMS
