= KRCO (AM) =

Radio station in Prineville–Bend, Oregon

- Prineville, Oregon; United States
- Broadcast area: Bend, Oregon
- Frequency: 690 kHz
- Branding: 92.5 The Ticket

Programming
- Format: Sports
- Affiliations: Fox Sports Radio; Oregon State Beavers; Portland Trail Blazers; Seattle Seahawks

Ownership
- Owner: Horizon Broadcasting Group
- Sister stations: KQAK, KRCO-FM, KWPK-FM

History
- First air date: February 1, 1950
- Call sign meaning: Central Oregon

Technical information
- Licensing authority: FCC
- Facility ID: 27171
- Class: D
- Power: 1,000 watts (day); 77 watts (night)
- Transmitter coordinates: 44°20′28″N 120°54′24″W
- Translator: 92.5 K223DJ (Prineville)
- Repeater: 105.7 KQAK-HD3 (Bend)

Links
- Public license information: Public file; LMS
- Website: 925theticket.com

KRCO (690 kHz) is a commercial sports AM radio station in Prineville in the U.S. state of Oregon. It broadcasts to the Bend area. On October 23, 2008, KRCO started broadcasting on 96.9 FM (call sign K245BC) via translator.

On April 1, 2022, KRCO changed their format from classic country (which moved to KRCO-FM 95.7 Prineville) to sports, branded as "96.9 The Ticket".

On March 13, 2023, KRCO rebranded as "92.5 The Ticket" as its K245BC translator moved from 96.9 FM in Prineville to 92.5 FM in Bend. The translator is fed by the HD3 channel of KQAK, also in Bend.
