= KRCO-FM =

Radio station in Prineville–Bend, Oregon

- Prineville, Oregon; United States
- Broadcast area: Bend, Oregon
- Frequency: 95.7 MHz
- Branding: 95.7 The Ranch

Programming
- Format: Country
- Affiliations: Seattle Seahawks

Ownership
- Owner: Horizon Broadcasting Group
- Sister stations: KQAK, KRCO, KWPK-FM

History
- First air date: April 8, 1981
- Former call signs: KRCO-FM (1979–1980, CP); KIJK (1980–2000); KRCO-FM (2000–2001); KMJZ-FM (2001–2003); KLTW-FM (2003–2022)
- Former frequencies: 95.3 MHz (1981–1984); 95.1 MHz (1984–2012)
- Call sign meaning: Central Oregon

Technical information
- Licensing authority: FCC
- Facility ID: 27168
- Class: C1
- ERP: 100,000 watts
- HAAT: 182 meters (597 ft)
- Transmitter coordinates: 44°4′40″N 121°19′49″W
- Translator: 93.3 K227DC (Prineville)

Links
- Public license information: Public file; LMS
- Website: 957theranch.com

KRCO-FM (95.7 MHz) is an American commercial radio station in Prineville, Oregon, broadcasting to the Bend, Oregon, area.

== History ==
As KIJK, the station had a Beautiful Music format up until the early 90's, when it switched to Country. KIJK became KRCO-FM in 2000, while continuing with Country.

In May of 2001, the station switched to Smooth Jazz as KMJZ-FM.

In September of 2003, the station switched to Soft Adult Contemporary "Lite 95.1" as KLTW-FM.

KLTW-FM moved from 95.1 on Powell Butte, to 95.7 on Awbrey Butte as "Lite 95.7" on August 28, 2012.

On June 23, 2014 at 12 midnight, KLTW-FM rebranded as 95.7 My FM.

On September 8, 2016 at 12:00 pm, KLTW-FM changed their format from adult contemporary to adult hits, originally branded as "95.7 Ben FM", but then rebranded as "Bend's 95.7".

On April 1, 2022, KLTW-FM changed their format from adult hits to classic country, branded as "95.7 The Ranch" under new KRCO-FM call letters.

== Translators ==
KRCO-FM broadcasts on the following translator:

Broadcast translator for KRCO-FM
Call sign	Frequency	City of license	FID	ERP (W)	Class	FCC info
K227DC	93.3 FM	Prineville, Oregon	27170	250	D	LMS
