= Crook County High School =

Location
- 1100 S E Lynn Blvd; Prineville, Crook County, Oregon 97754; United States; 44.292833°N 120.832422°W

Information
- Type: Public
- Opened: 1996
- School district: Crook County School District
- Principal: Jake Huffman
- Grades: 9-12
- Enrollment: 877 (2023-2024)
- Colors: Blue and Gold
- Athletics conference: OSAA 4A-2 Tri-Valley Conference
- Mascot: Cowboys
- Rival: Redmond High School
- Website: Crook County High School Homepage

Crook County High School (CCHS) is a public high school in Prineville, Oregon, United States. It is the sole high school of the Crook County School District. The district covers all of Crook County, and a section of Deschutes County, which includes Brothers. All of Crook County is assigned to this school.

== History ==
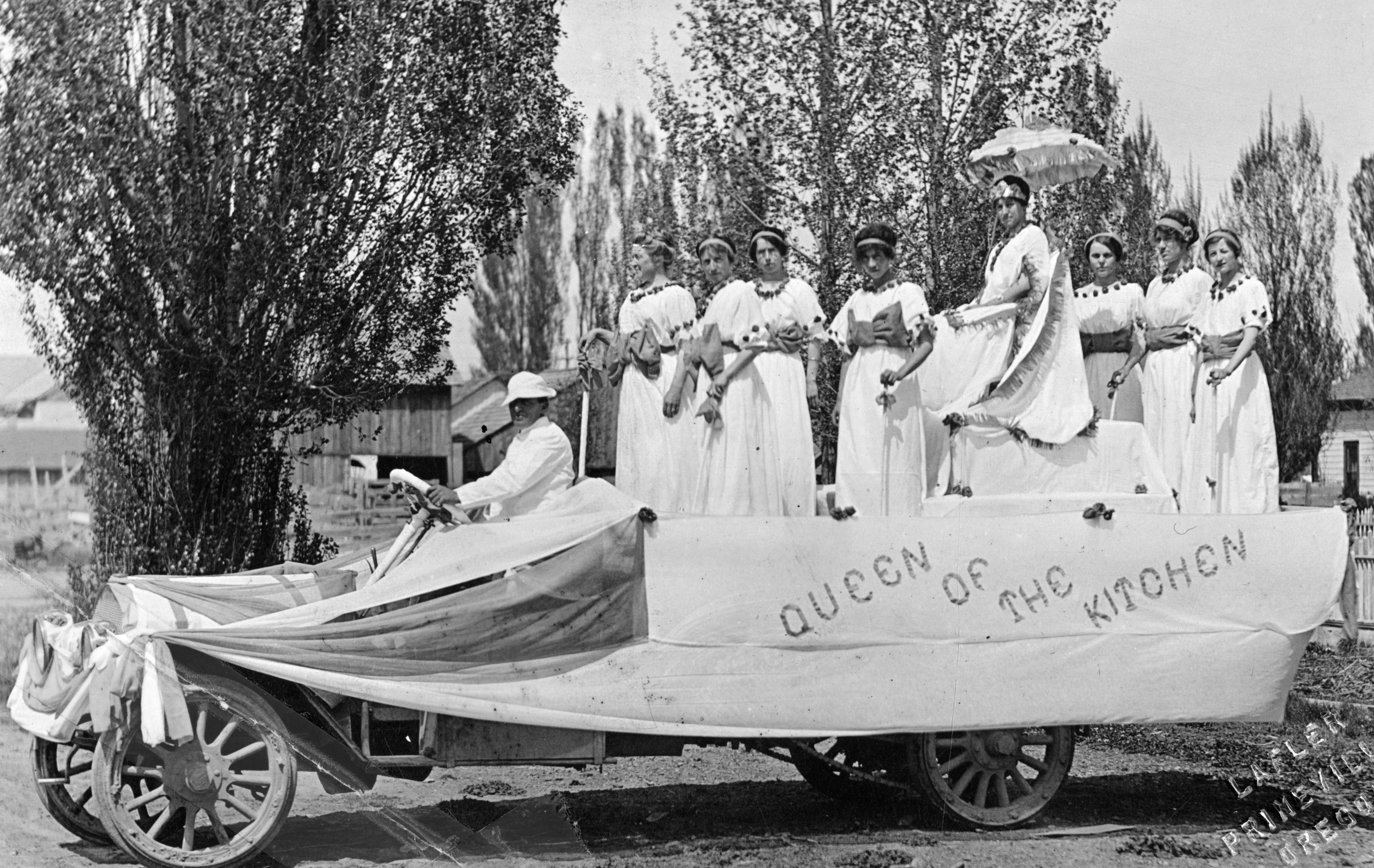
'Queen Of The Kitchen' (home economics) parade float in 1914

In 2014, Facebook donated a $105,000 Local Community Action Grant to Crook county schools. Facebook provided funding and donated servers to the school for a Data center infrastructure management program. Facebook has a large data center in Prineville. $10,000 of the total amount was shared between Crook County High School and Central Oregon Community College Prineville Campus.

== Student body ==
In 2006, the principal at the time, Jim Golden, gave an estimation that about 5% of the student body resides at distances exceeding 20 miles (32 km) from the school. Some students who had primary residences far from the school lived in locations in Prineville all or some of the time.

== Transportation ==
For Paulina residents, the district sends a school bus there. The bus ride to school each way is two hours.

== Academics ==
In 2008, 91% of the school's seniors received their high school diploma. Of 215 students, 196 graduated, 12 dropped out, 1 received a modified diploma, and 6 are still in high school. In 2021, the graduation rate was 98%.

== Athletics ==
The Crook County High School athletic teams compete in the OSAA 4A-2 Tri-Valley Conference (excluding Football which competes in 4A-SD5). The athletic director is Rob Bonner and the athletics secretary is Debbie Proctor.

State Championships:

- Boys Golf: 2016
- Boys Cross Country: 1976, 2017
- Dance/Drill: 2009, 2010, 2012, 2013
- Football: 1952, 1953, 1984
- Girls Basketball: 1979, 1983
- Girls Golf: 2023
- Girls Track and Field: 1973, 1976, 1979
- Girls Tennis: 2011
- Girls Cross Country: 1974, 1975, 1976, 1978
- Volleyball: 2006, 2007, 2008, 2009, 2010, 2011, 2012, 2013
- Wrestling: 1969, 1975, 2013, 2014, 2015, 2016, 2018

== See also ==
- High Desert Christian Academy

== Notable alumni ==
- Darrel Aschbacher - Former guard for the Philadelphia Eagles.
