= Crook County School District =

School district in Oregon, United States

Crook County School District (CCSD) is a school district headquartered in Prineville, Oregon.

Its boundary includes all of Crook County, as well as sections of Deschutes County.

== History ==
The Brothers School District consolidated into the Crook County district effective 2006.

Melissa Skinner became the superintendent in 2024.

== Schools ==
High schools

- Crook County High School - All of Crook County is zoned to this school.
- Pioneer Secondary Alternative High School (alternative)

Middle school

- Crook County Middle School

Elementary schools

- Barnes Butte Elementary School
- Crooked River Elementary School
- Steins Pillar Elementary School

K-8 schools

- Brothers Elementary School (rural) - The grounds include the current school building, a one room schoolhouse, as well as the former school, used for storage. The school has a teachers residence and relies on a well. In 2023 it had a four day school week, with two teachers alternating days. In 2023 its student count was six. The Brothers School closed in 2006, but it reopened in 2015. The facility was formerly operated by the Brothers School District.
- Paulina Elementary School (rural) - What became the school's main building opened in 1949.
- Powell Butte Community Charter School - In 2009 it became a charter school as per a vote from the district board of trustees. This went forward instead of an initial decision to close the school. The district sought to close the school due to a reduced budget. The impetus to convert to a charter came before the school district formally sought to close the school, as parents felt a closure would be likely upon seeing the grade span reduced to ending at the third grade instead of ending at the sixth grade. In response, people in Powell Butte did fundraising so the school would instead have its grade span up to the fifth grade. A $505,000 grant was used to help establish the charter for the school. The school relies on a septic tank.

== See also ==
- High Desert Christian Academy
