= Crook County, Oregon =

County in Oregon, United States

- County
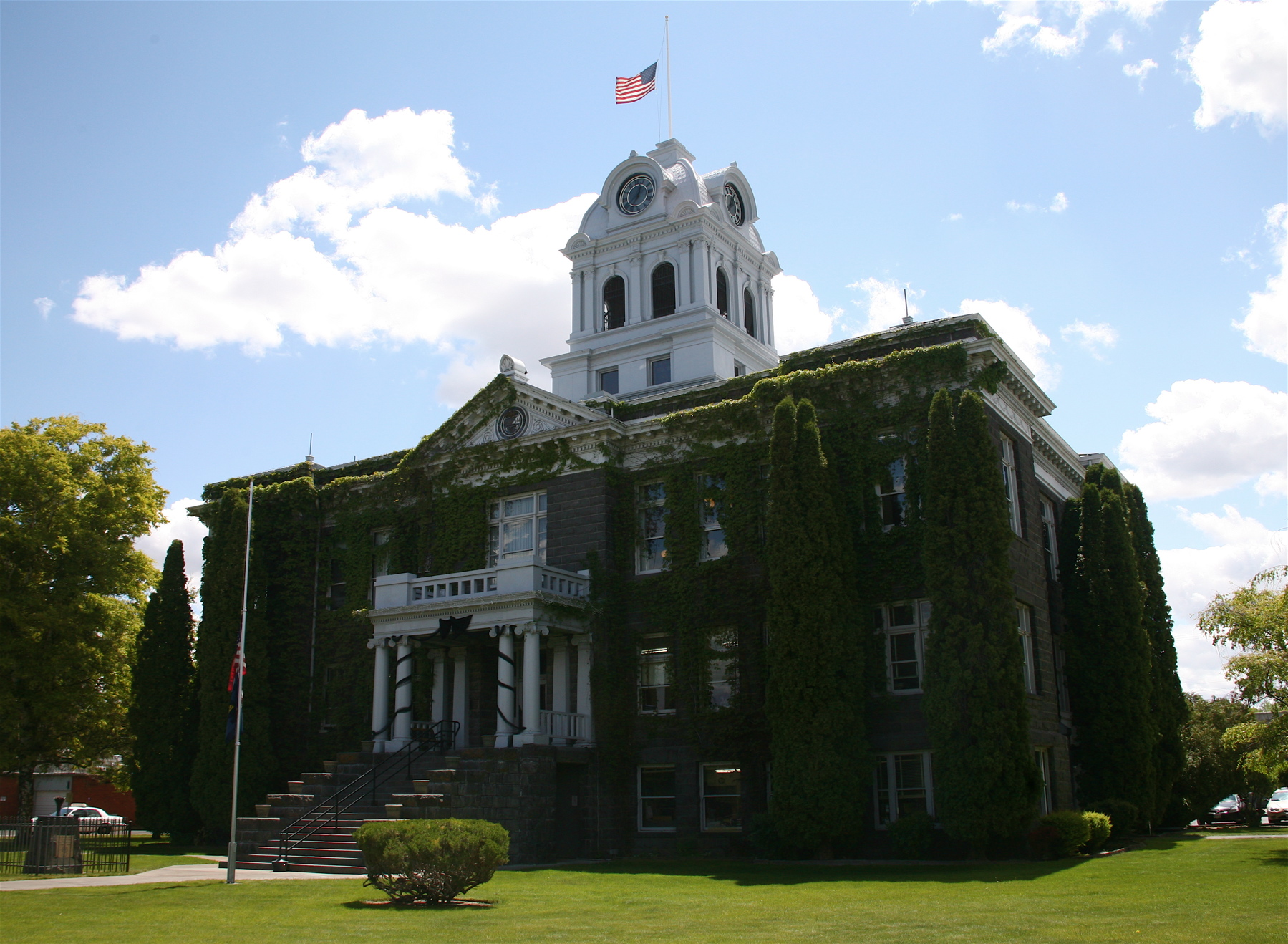
- Crook County Courthouse in Prineville

- Location within the U.S. state of Oregon
- Coordinates: 44°08′N 120°22′W
- Country: United States
- State: Oregon
- Founded: October 24, 1882
- Named for: George Crook
- Seat: Prineville
- Largest city: Prineville

Area
  - Total: 2,987 sq mi (7,740 km^{2})
  - Land: 2,979 sq mi (7,720 km^{2})
  - Water: 8.2 sq mi (21 km^{2}) 0.3%

Population (2020)
  - Total: 24,738
  - Estimate (2025): 27,564 ▲
  - Density: 7/sq mi (2.7/km^{2})
- Time zone: UTC−8 (Pacific)
  - Summer (DST): UTC−7 (PDT)
- Congressional district: 2nd
- Website: crookcountyor.gov

Crook County is one of the 36 counties in the U.S. state of Oregon. As of the 2020 census, the population was 24,738. The county seat is Prineville. The county is named after George Crook, a U.S. Army officer who served in the American Civil War and various Indian Wars.

Crook County comprises the Prineville, OR Micropolitan Statistical Area, which is included in the Bend—Prineville, OR Combined Statistical Area.

== History ==
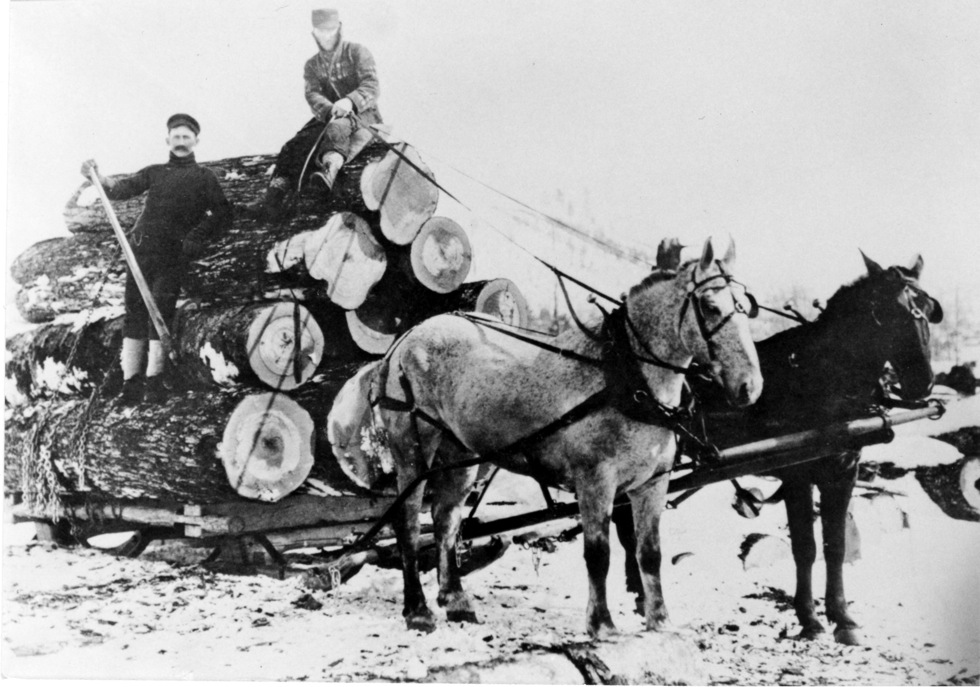
Logging in the Ochoco Mountains, c. 1900

Crook County was established on October 9, 1882, by an act of the Oregon State Legislature. The county was named after General George Crook, a veteran of various battles against the indigenous peoples of Eastern Oregon in the middle of the 19th century. The county was formed from territory formerly part of Wasco County, including the hilly region where the foothills of the Blue Mountains intersect the Cascade Mountain Range.

Access into the region at first was difficult, which discouraged settlement. The first effort to develop routes into the area was in 1862 when a supply train with cattle crossed the Scott Trail. This was also the first group of non-natives to spend the winter in central Oregon. The discovery and development of the Santiam Pass in the 1860s improved access into the area.

Prineville, incorporated in 1880 and then the only incorporated town in the county, was established as the county seat. This decision was confirmed by the voters in the 1884 general election.

From the start cattle ranching has been one of the primary industries of the county, with huge herds grazing the countryside from the 1880s. Farming was also developed in certain valley regions friendly to agriculture.

Logging in the Ochoco Mountains and the timber mills that accompanied also greatly contributed to the economic and population growth of the county. The first recorded mention of a sawmill was made by George Barnes, speaking about the Swartz sawmill on Mill Creek, circa 1867.

== Geography ==
Map of Crook County

The county is located in the geographic center of Oregon. According to the U.S. Census Bureau, the county has a total area of 2,987 square miles (7,740 km^{2}), of which 2,979 square miles (7,720 km^{2}) is land and 8.2 square miles (21 km^{2}) (0.3%) is water. The largest body of water in Crook County is the Prineville Reservoir. The county has been reduced from its original size of 8,600 square miles (22,000 km^{2}) by the creation of Jefferson County in 1914 and Deschutes County in 1916. The present boundaries were established in 1927.

The oldest geological formation in Oregon is in the southeastern corner of Crook County, near its boundary with Grant County. This formation is an outcropping of Devonian limestone created from a larger reef when most of Oregon was covered by water.

=== Adjacent counties ===
- Jefferson County - north
- Wheeler County - north
- Grant County - east
- Harney County - southeast
- Deschutes County - southwest

=== National protected area ===
- Ochoco National Forest (part)

== Demographics ==
Historical population
Census	Pop.	Note	%±
1890	3,244		—
1900	3,964		22.2%
1910	9,315		135.0%
1920	3,424		−63.2%
1930	3,336		−2.6%
1940	5,533		65.9%
1950	8,991		62.5%
1960	9,430		4.9%
1970	9,985		5.9%
1980	13,091		31.1%
1990	14,111		7.8%
2000	19,182		35.9%
2010	20,978		9.4%
2020	24,738		17.9%
2025 (est.)	27,564	▲	11.4%
U.S. Decennial Census; 1790–1960 1900–1990; 1990–2000 2010–2020

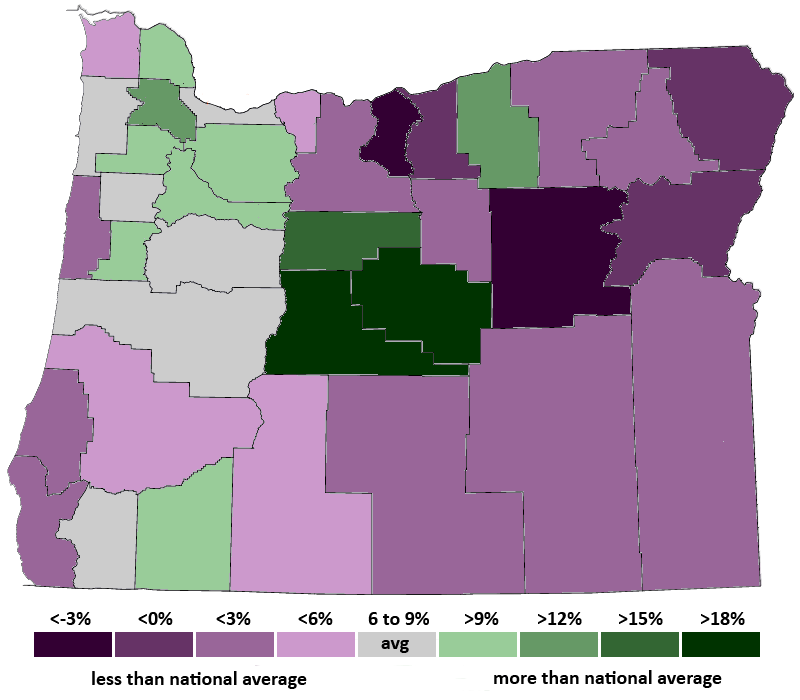
From 2000 to 2007, Crook County's population grew by 34.9%, more than three times the state average. It was the second fastest growing county in the state, after neighboring Deschutes County.

=== 2020 census ===
As of the 2020 census, the county had a population of 24,738. Of the residents, 19.7% were under the age of 18 and 26.2% were 65 years of age or older; the median age was 47.3 years. For every 100 females there were 99.8 males, and for every 100 females age 18 and over there were 98.7 males. 50.2% of residents lived in urban areas and 49.8% lived in rural areas.

The racial makeup of the county was 86.3% White, 0.3% Black or African American, 1.3% American Indian and Alaska Native, 0.5% Asian, 0.1% Native Hawaiian and Pacific Islander, 3.4% from some other race, and 8.1% from two or more races. Hispanic or Latino residents of any race comprised 7.3% of the population.

There were 9,975 households in the county, of which 25.5% had children under the age of 18 living with them and 20.7% had a female householder with no spouse or partner present. About 23.5% of all households were made up of individuals and 12.8% had someone living alone who was 65 years of age or older.

There were 11,159 housing units, of which 10.6% were vacant. Among occupied housing units, 74.5% were owner-occupied and 25.5% were renter-occupied. The homeowner vacancy rate was 1.1% and the rental vacancy rate was 4.0%.

Crook County, Oregon – Racial and ethnic composition Note: the US Census treats Hispanic/Latino as an ethnic category. This table excludes Latinos from the racial categories and assigns them to a separate category. Hispanics/Latinos may be of any race.
Race / Ethnicity (NH = Non-Hispanic)	Pop 1980	Pop 1990	Pop 2000	Pop 2010	Pop 2020	% 1980	% 1990	% 2000	% 2010	% 2020
White alone (NH)	12,741	13,455	17,532	18,758	20,874	97.33%	95.35%	91.40%	89.42%	84.38%
Black or African American alone (NH)	3	11	6	30	78	0.02%	0.08%	0.03%	0.14%	0.32%
Native American or Alaska Native alone (NH)	119	207	235	273	262	0.91%	1.47%	1.23%	1.30%	1.06%
Asian alone (NH)	35	47	82	96	114	0.27%	0.33%	0.43%	0.46%	0.46%
Native Hawaiian or Pacific Islander alone (NH)	x	x	6	11	23	x	x	0.03%	0.05%	0.09%
Other race alone (NH)	12	3	12	12	102	0.09%	0.02%	0.06%	0.06%	0.41%
Mixed race or Multiracial (NH)	x	x	227	335	1,482	x	x	1.18%	1.60%	5.99%
Hispanic or Latino (any race)	181	388	1,082	1,463	1,803	1.38%	2.75%	5.64%	6.97%	7.29%
Total	13,091	14,111	19,182	20,978	24,738	100.00%	100.00%	100.00%	100.00%	100.00%

=== American Community Survey 2025 data ===
The United States Census Bureau estimated that in 2025, Crook County’s population was 27.564. It was also estimated that the county's population was 84,79% Non-Hispanic White, 8,71% Hispanic or Latino, 0,32% Non-Hispanic Black, 0,71% Asian, 1,11% Native American, 0,08% Pacific Islander, and 4,29% Multiracial.

Total	Population	Percentage
Non-Hispanic White	23.371	84,79%
Hispanic or Latino	2.400	8,71%
Non-Hispanic Black	88	0,32%
Asian	197	0,71%
Native American	305	1,11%
Pacific Islander	21	0,08%
Non-Hispanic Multiracial	1.182	4,29%

=== 2010 census ===
As of the 2010 census, there were 20,978 people, 8,558 households, and 6,025 families living in the county. The population density was 7.0 inhabitants per square mile (2.7/km^{2}). There were 10,202 housing units at an average density of 3.4 units per square mile (1.3 units/km^{2}). The racial makeup of the county was 92.7% white, 1.4% American Indian, 0.5% Asian, 0.2% black or African American, 0.1% Pacific islander, 3.2% from other races, and 2.0% from two or more races. Those of Hispanic or Latino origin made up 7.0% of the population. In terms of ancestry, 20.7% were German, 14.6% were English, 12.6% were Irish, and 6.2% were American.

Of the 8,558 households, 27.7% had children under the age of 18 living with them, 57.1% were married couples living together, 9.0% had a female householder with no husband present, 29.6% were non-families, and 24.1% of all households were made up of individuals. The average household size was 2.42 and the average family size was 2.84. The median age was 45.6 years.

The median income for a household in the county was $46,059 and the median income for a family was $52,477. Males had a median income of $41,375 versus $29,545 for females. The per capita income for the county was $22,275. About 10.6% of families and 14.0% of the population were below the poverty line, including 26.1% of those under age 18 and 4.0% of those age 65 or over.

=== 2000 census ===
As of the 2000 census, there were 19,182 people, 7,354 households, and 5,427 families living in the county. The population density was 6 people per square mile (2.3 people/km^{2}). There were 8,264 housing units at an average density of 3 units per square mile (1.2/km^{2}). The racial makeup of the county was 92.95% White, 0.04% Black or African American, 1.30% Native American, 0.43% Asian, 0.03% Pacific Islander, 3.81% from other races, and 1.43% from two or more races. 5.64% of the population were Hispanic or Latino of any race. 26.2% were of American, 14.8% German, 9.7% English and 8.9% Irish ancestry.

There were 7,354 households, out of which 32.30% had children under the age of 18 living with them, 61.50% were married couples living together, 8.20% had a female householder with no husband present, and 26.20% were non-families. 21.30% of all households were made up of individuals, and 9.50% had someone living alone who was 65 years of age or older. The average household size was 2.57 and the average family size was 2.96.

In the county, the population was spread out, with 26.60% under the age of 18, 7.50% from 18 to 24, 25.50% from 25 to 44, 25.70% from 45 to 64, and 14.70% who were 65 years of age or older. The median age was 39 years. For every 100 females there were 99.40 males. For every 100 females age 18 and over, there were 97.30 males.

The median income for a household in the county was $35,186, and the median income for a family was $40,746. Males had a median income of $32,166 versus $22,580 for females. The per capita income for the county was $16,899. About 8.10% of families and 11.30% of the population were below the poverty line, including 13.90% of those under age 18 and 8.10% of those age 65 or over.

== Communities ==
=== City ===
- Prineville (county seat)

=== Census-designated places ===
- Juniper Canyon
- Ochoco West
- Prineville Lake Acres

=== Other unincorporated communities ===
- Forest Crossing. Forest Crossing was named after Francis Forest.
- Lone Pine
- O'Neil. O'Neil is named for William G. O'Neil or his family.
- Paulina
- Post
- Powell Butte
- Roberts
- Suplee

== Politics ==
Though Crook County is the most central county in Oregon, politically it falls in line with the eastern side of the state. The majority of registered voters who are part of a political party in Crook County, as well as most counties in eastern Oregon, are members of the Republican Party. Crook County was formerly a presidential bellwether county, voting with the winner since 1888, in 26 presidential elections. However, the county lost its longest bellwether status to Okanogan County, Washington after voting for George H. W. Bush in 1992. It has voted Republican ever since.

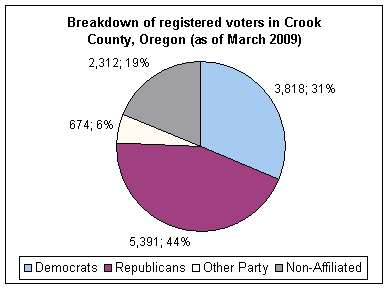

United States presidential election results for Crook County, Oregon
Year	Republican		Democratic		Third party(ies)	
Year	No.	%	No.	%	No.	%
1904	763	65.33%	266	22.77%	139	11.90%
1908	915	56.87%	548	34.06%	146	9.07%
1912	770	27.60%	1,060	37.99%	960	34.41%
1916	1,675	36.21%	2,699	58.34%	252	5.45%
1920	872	59.20%	528	35.85%	73	4.96%
1924	725	50.73%	434	30.37%	270	18.89%
1928	877	63.46%	487	35.24%	18	1.30%
1932	626	37.80%	990	59.78%	40	2.42%
1936	589	33.62%	1,086	61.99%	77	4.39%
1940	942	39.28%	1,439	60.01%	17	0.71%
1944	932	44.28%	1,145	54.39%	28	1.33%
1948	960	44.84%	1,149	53.67%	32	1.49%
1952	2,124	57.70%	1,490	40.48%	67	1.82%
1956	1,879	51.00%	1,805	49.00%	0	0.00%
1960	1,732	46.35%	2,005	53.65%	0	0.00%
1964	1,161	32.38%	2,419	67.46%	6	0.17%
1968	1,727	47.88%	1,611	44.66%	269	7.46%
1972	2,167	52.56%	1,743	42.28%	213	5.17%
1976	2,093	43.81%	2,536	53.09%	148	3.10%
1980	3,113	53.10%	2,162	36.88%	587	10.01%
1984	3,773	62.22%	2,268	37.40%	23	0.38%
1988	3,049	51.84%	2,719	46.23%	114	1.94%
1992	2,703	37.18%	2,508	34.49%	2,060	28.33%
1996	3,250	46.50%	2,607	37.30%	1,132	16.20%
2000	5,363	64.79%	2,474	29.89%	440	5.32%
2004	6,830	67.95%	3,024	30.09%	197	1.96%
2008	6,371	61.54%	3,632	35.09%	349	3.37%
2012	6,790	66.37%	3,104	30.34%	336	3.28%
2016	8,511	69.92%	2,637	21.66%	1,024	8.41%
2020	11,287	73.06%	3,801	24.61%	360	2.33%
2024	12,012	73.71%	3,836	23.54%	449	2.76%

== Economy ==
Forest products, agriculture, livestock raising and recreation/tourism services constitute Crook County's total economy. Agriculture is supported by the development of irrigation districts, which permits the raising of hay, grain, mint, potatoes, and seed. Range and forest lands allow grazing for a sizable livestock industry. The Ochoco National Forest's stand of ponderosa pine is the main source of lumber. Tourism and recreation help round out the economy. Thousands of hunters, fishers, boaters, sightseers and rockhounds are annual visitors to its streams, reservoirs and the Ochoco Mountains. The Prineville Chamber of Commerce provides access to over 1,000 acres (4.0 km^{2}) of mining claims to rockhounds, who can dig for free agates, limb casts, jasper and thundereggs.

== Education ==
There is one school district in the county: Crook County School District. All of Crook County is zoned to Crook County High School.

Crook County is in the boundary of Central Oregon Community College.

== See also ==
- National Register of Historic Places listings in Crook County, Oregon
