= Prineville, Oregon =

- City
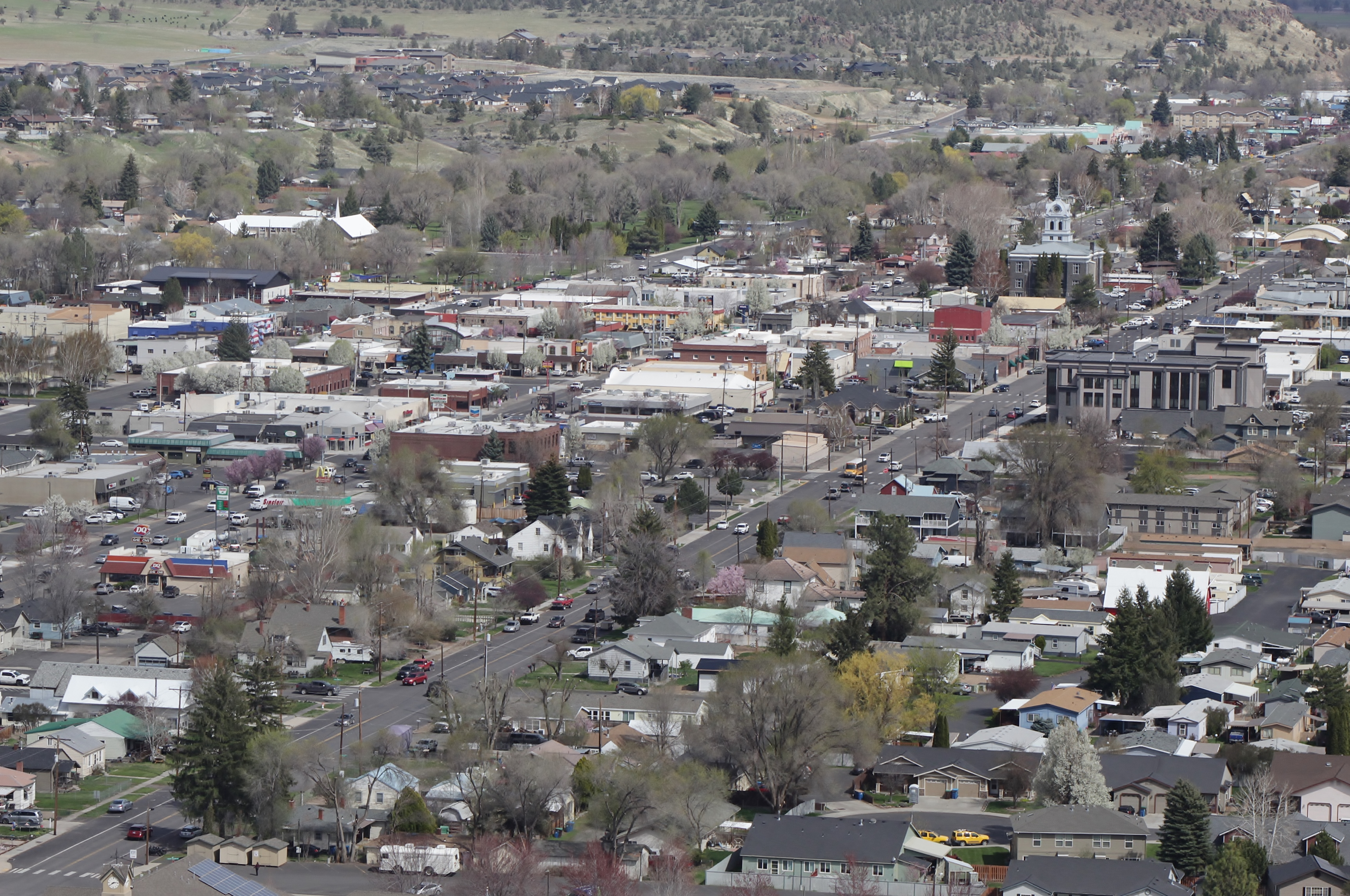
- Downtown Prineville from Ochoco State Scenic Viewpoint
- Nicknames: The Key City of the High Desert, Rockhound Capital of the U.S.
- Motto(s): The Heart of Oregon, Oregon's High Desert
- Location in Oregon
- Coordinates: 44°18′14″N 120°50′46″W
- Country: United States
- State: Oregon
- County: Crook
- Incorporated: 1880

Government
  - Acting Mayor: Steve Uffelman

Area
  - Total: 12.83 sq mi (33.23 km^{2})
  - Land: 12.83 sq mi (33.23 km^{2})
  - Water: 0 sq mi (0.00 km^{2})
- Elevation: 2,868 ft (874.2 m)

Population (2020)
  - Total: 10,736
  - Density: 836.7/sq mi (323.07/km^{2})
- Time zone: UTC−8 (Pacific)
  - Summer (DST): UTC−7 (Pacific)
- ZIP code: 97754
- Area code: 541
- FIPS code: 41-59850
- GNIS feature ID: 1154317
- Website: www.cityofprineville.com

Prineville is a city in and the county seat of Crook County, Oregon, United States. It was named for the first merchant to establish businesses in the present location, Barney Prine. The population was 10,429 at the 2020 census.

== History ==
Prineville was founded in 1877 when Monroe Hodges filed the original plat for the city. The post office for the community had been established with the name of Prine on April 13, 1871, but changed to Prineville on December 23, 1872. The city was incorporated by the Oregon Legislative Assembly on October 23, 1880, and obtained its first high school in 1902.

Long the major town in central Oregon, Prineville was snubbed in 1911 when the railroad tycoons James J. Hill and Edward H. Harriman bypassed the city as they laid track south from The Dalles. In a period when the presence of a railroad meant the difference between prosperity and an eventual fate as a ghost town, in a 1917 election, Prineville residents voted 355 to 1 to build their own railway, and raised the money to connect their town to the main line 19 miles (31 km) away.

Helped by timber harvests from the nearby Ochoco National Forest, the City of Prineville Railroad prospered for decades. The profits from the railroad were so abundant that between 1964 and 1968, the city levied no property taxes. However, with the decline of the timber industry in Oregon, the railroad reported a loss of nearly $1 million between 2002 and 2004.

Since the late 2000s, Apple and Facebook have each invested over $1 billion in multiple data centers located within Prineville city limits.

== Geography ==
According to the United States Census Bureau, the city has a total area of 10.92 square miles (28.28 km^{2}), all of it land.

Prineville is located on the Crooked River at the mouth of Ochoco Creek, 14 miles (23 km) northwest of the Prineville Reservoir.

During the Miocene and Oligocene, great basaltic flows swept through the area. Barnes Butte is a prominent butte of this activity, located partially within the city.

=== Climate ===
Prineville has a cool semi-arid climate (BSk) according to the Köppen climate classification system.

The highest temperature recorded in Prineville was 119 °F (48.3 °C), which was recorded on July 29, 1898. Hermiston also recorded the same temperature on the same day, which registered both cities as the record holders of the highest temperature recorded in Oregon. Shortly after, on August 10, 1898, Pendleton and Redmond also recorded 119 °F (48.3 °C). The most recent time Oregon’s highest temperature was recorded was on June 29, 2021 in Pelton Dam, where it also recorded 119 °F (48.3 °C).

Climate data for Prineville, Oregon (1991–2020 normals, extremes 1897–present)
Month	Jan	Feb	Mar	Apr	May	Jun	Jul	Aug	Sep	Oct	Nov	Dec	Year
Record high °F (°C)	76 (24)	75 (24)	83 (28)	92 (33)	99 (37)	109 (43)	119 (48)	106 (41)	107 (42)	93 (34)	82 (28)	76 (24)	119 (48)
Mean daily maximum °F (°C)	43.2 (6.2)	47.6 (8.7)	54.7 (12.6)	60.2 (15.7)	68.9 (20.5)	76.4 (24.7)	86.9 (30.5)	86.4 (30.2)	79.0 (26.1)	65.1 (18.4)	51.3 (10.7)	41.9 (5.5)	63.5 (17.5)
Daily mean °F (°C)	34.1 (1.2)	37.0 (2.8)	41.9 (5.5)	46.7 (8.2)	54.5 (12.5)	60.5 (15.8)	68.0 (20.0)	67.1 (19.5)	60.5 (15.8)	49.7 (9.8)	40.0 (4.4)	32.9 (0.5)	49.4 (9.7)
Mean daily minimum °F (°C)	25.1 (−3.8)	26.4 (−3.1)	29.2 (−1.6)	33.1 (0.6)	40.0 (4.4)	44.5 (6.9)	49.1 (9.5)	47.8 (8.8)	41.9 (5.5)	34.3 (1.3)	28.6 (−1.9)	23.9 (−4.5)	35.3 (1.8)
Record low °F (°C)	−35 (−37)	−24 (−31)	−14 (−26)	7 (−14)	13 (−11)	20 (−7)	26 (−3)	23 (−5)	12 (−11)	4 (−16)	−15 (−26)	−32 (−36)	−35 (−37)
Average precipitation inches (mm)	1.06 (27)	0.80 (20)	0.91 (23)	0.76 (19)	1.38 (35)	0.85 (22)	0.40 (10)	0.36 (9.1)	0.31 (7.9)	0.95 (24)	1.22 (31)	1.33 (34)	10.33 (262)
Average snowfall inches (cm)	1.8 (4.6)	3.2 (8.1)	0.9 (2.3)	0.3 (0.76)	0.0 (0.0)	0.0 (0.0)	0.0 (0.0)	0.0 (0.0)	0.0 (0.0)	0.0 (0.0)	1.1 (2.8)	1.5 (3.8)	8.8 (22)
Average precipitation days (≥ 0.01 in)	8.1	7.0	8.1	7.8	7.2	5.3	2.1	2.4	2.8	6.4	8.4	7.8	73.4
Average snowy days (≥ 0.1 in)	1.6	2.3	1.1	0.3	0.0	0.0	0.0	0.0	0.0	0.0	0.9	1.1	7.3
Source: NOAA

== Demographics ==
Historical population
Census	Pop.	Note	%±
1890	460		—
1900	656		42.6%
1910	1,042		58.8%
1920	1,144		9.8%
1930	1,027		−10.2%
1940	2,358		129.6%
1950	3,233		37.1%
1960	3,263		0.9%
1970	4,101		25.7%
1980	5,276		28.7%
1990	5,355		1.5%
2000	7,563		41.2%
2010	9,253		22.3%
2020	10,736		16.0%
U.S. Decennial Census

=== 2020 census ===
As of the 2020 census, Prineville had a population of 10,736 and a median age of 40.6 years; 22.8% of residents were under the age of 18 and 21.5% were 65 years of age or older, while for every 100 females there were 94.8 males and for every 100 females age 18 and over there were 92.1 males age 18 and over.

According to the 2020 Decennial Census Demographic and Housing Characteristics dataset, 96.1% of residents lived in urban areas and 3.9% lived in rural areas.

There were 4,306 households in Prineville, of which 29.5% had children under the age of 18 living in them, 44.6% were married-couple households, 18.5% were households with a male householder and no spouse or partner present, and 28.5% were households with a female householder and no spouse or partner present; about 28.9% of all households were made up of individuals and 15.0% had someone living alone who was 65 years of age or older.

There were 4,579 housing units, of which 6.0% were vacant; among occupied units, 60.3% were owner-occupied and 39.7% were renter-occupied, with homeowner and rental vacancy rates of 1.1% and 4.4%, respectively.

Racial composition as of the 2020 census
Race	Number	Percent
White	9,002	83.8%
Black or African American	43	0.4%
American Indian and Alaska Native	153	1.4%
Asian	63	0.6%
Native Hawaiian and Other Pacific Islander	14	0.1%
Some other race	545	5.1%
Two or more races	916	8.5%
Hispanic or Latino (of any race)	1,159	10.8%

=== 2010 census ===
As of the census of 2010, there were 9,253 people, 3,692 households, and 2,407 families residing in the city. The population density was 847.3 inhabitants per square mile (327.1/km^{2}). There were 4,181 housing units at an average density of 382.9 per square mile (147.8/km^{2}). The racial makeup of the city was 90.4% White, 0.2% African American, 1.5% Native American, 0.7% Asian, 0.1% Pacific Islander, 4.9% from other races, and 2.2% from two or more races. Hispanic or Latino of any race were 10.1% of the population.

There were 3,692 households, of which 32.9% had children under the age of 18 living with them, 46.8% were married couples living together, 13.5% had a female householder with no husband present, 4.9% had a male householder with no wife present, and 34.8% were non-families. 29.3% of all households were made up of individuals, and 13.4% had someone living alone who was 65 years of age or older. The average household size was 2.44 and the average family size was 2.98.

The median age in the city was 38.2 years. 25.5% of residents were under the age of 18; 7.5% were between the ages of 18 and 24; 24.9% were from 25 to 44; 24.6% were from 45 to 64; and 17.4% were 65 years of age or older. The gender makeup of the city was 48.1% male and 51.9% female.

=== 2000 census ===
As of the census of 2000, there were 7,356 people, 2,817 households, and 1,907 families residing in the city. The population density was 1,105.9 inhabitants per square mile (427.0/km^{2}). There were 3,022 housing units at an average density of 454.3 per square mile (175.4/km^{2}). The racial makeup of the city was 91.80% White, 0.01% African American, 1.50% Native American, 0.73% Asian, 0.01% Pacific Islander, 4.50% from other races, and 1.44% from two or more races. Hispanic or Latino of any race were 7.42% of the population.

Of the 2,817 households, 35.8% had children under the age of 18 living with them, 51.4% were married couples living together, 11.7% had a female householder with no husband present, and 32.3% were non-families. 27.1% of all households were made up of individuals, and 13.2% had someone living alone who was 65 years of age or older. The average household size was 2.55 and the average family size was 3.09.

In the city, the population was spread out, with 29.3% under the age of 18, 9.6% from 18 to 24, 27.0% from 25 to 44, 18.6% from 45 to 64, and 15.5% who were 65 years of age or older. The median age was 33 years. For every 100 females, there were 93.1 males. For every 100 females age 18 and over, there were 88.0 males.

The median income for a household in the city was $30,435, and the median income for a family was $36,587. Males had a median income of $31,224 versus $22,852 for females. The per capita income for the city was $14,163. About 10.0% of families and 14.3% of the population were below the poverty line, including 16.6% of those under age 18 and 13.1% of those age 65 or over.

== Economy ==
Les Schwab Tire Centers, a chain of tire stores based in Prineville, has been associated with the city since the company's founding in 1952. As of 2022, the Les Schwab Tire Center chain operates more than 500 stores in California, Idaho, Montana, Nevada, Oregon, Utah, and Washington, does more than $1.5 billion in annual sales, and according to the AP, is the number two private tire retailer in the United States. The company announced on December 12, 2006, that it would be moving the corporate headquarters to nearby Bend, where a growing number of its executives live, including Dick Borgman who became CEO on the same day. In 2006, journalist Mike Rogoway noted:

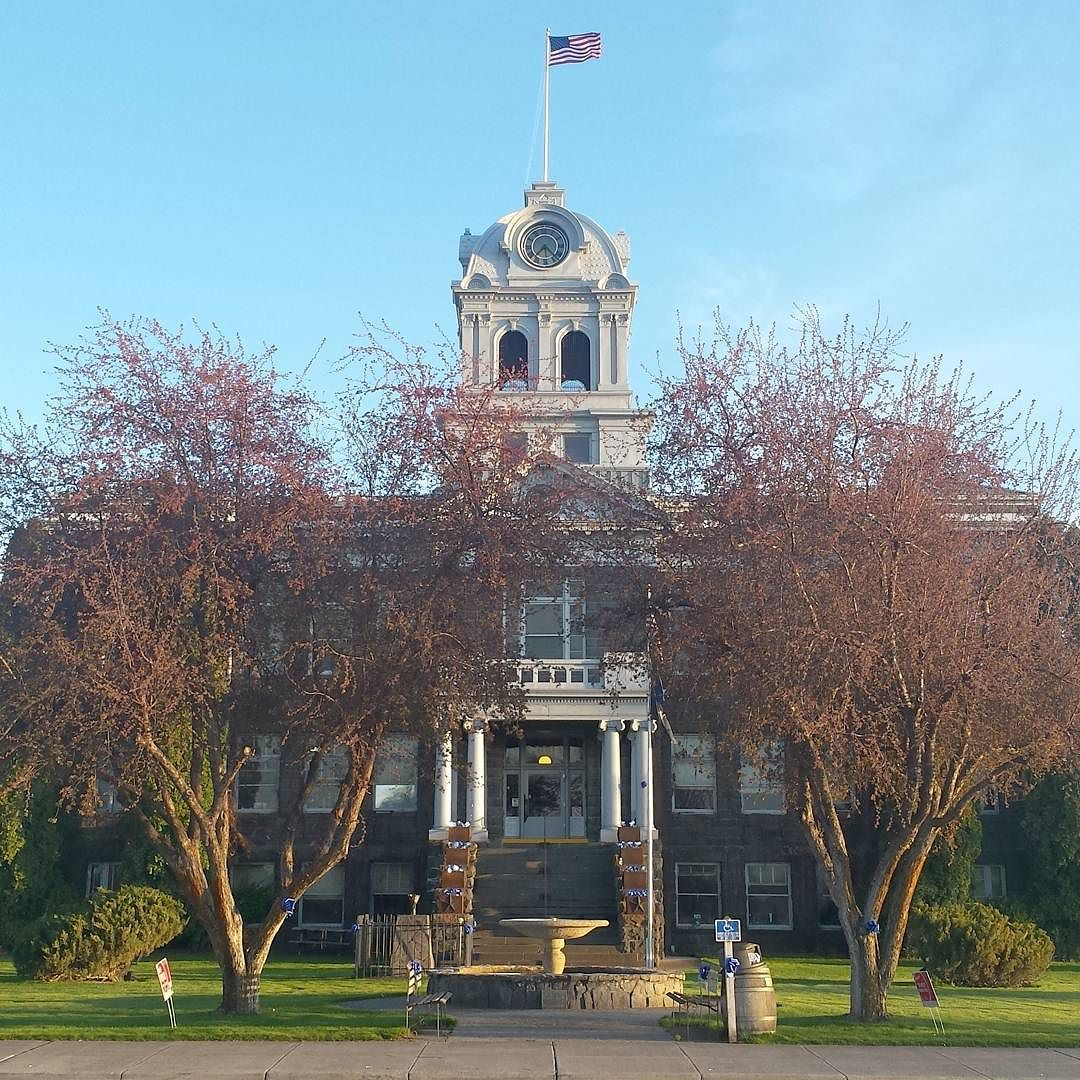
Crook County Courthouse

A decade ago, Schwab could have devastated Prineville by pulling out. Now, though, the city that suffered through the downturn in the wood products industry is enjoying an economic renaissance. Federal jobs with the Bureau of Land Management and Forest Service help anchor the economy [Judge Scott Cooper, Crook County administrator, was quoted], while a housing boom and a growing tourism industry have diversified the area. In December 2006, unemployment was 4.4 percent, the lowest since the 1960s.

In 2010, Prineville was selected as the location for a new data center for Facebook. This center has been met with criticism from environmental groups such as Greenpeace because the power utility company contracted for the center, PacifiCorp, generates 70 percent of its electricity from coal.

On February 21, 2012, Apple announced that it would open a "Green Data Center" on a 160-acre (65 ha) tract of land owned by the company.

Since the late 2000s, Apple and Facebook have each invested over $1 billion in multiple data centers located within Prineville city limits.

== Education ==
It is in the Crook County School District, as is the remainder of the county. Schools in the district include:

- Barnes Butte Elementary
- Crooked River Elementary
- Steins Pillar Elementary
- Crook County Middle School
- Crook County High School
- Pioneer Secondary Alternative High School

High Desert Christian Academy is a private K-12 School.

A campus of Central Oregon Community College is located in Prineville.

== Media ==
Prineville Territory Magazine is a seasonal magazine.

The Central Oregonian is a twice-weekly newspaper published in Prineville.

Commercial radio stations licensed to Prineville include:

- KRCO at 690 kHz (rebroadcast on 96.9 FM)
- KRCO-FM at 95.7 MHz (rebroadcast in 93.7 FM) and
- KNLX at 104.9 MHz

== Infrastructure ==
=== Transportation ===
- Prineville Airport
- U.S. Route 26
- Oregon Route 126
- City of Prineville Railway, a municipally owned railway established in 1918.
