= Ochoco Mountains =

Mountain range in Oregon, US

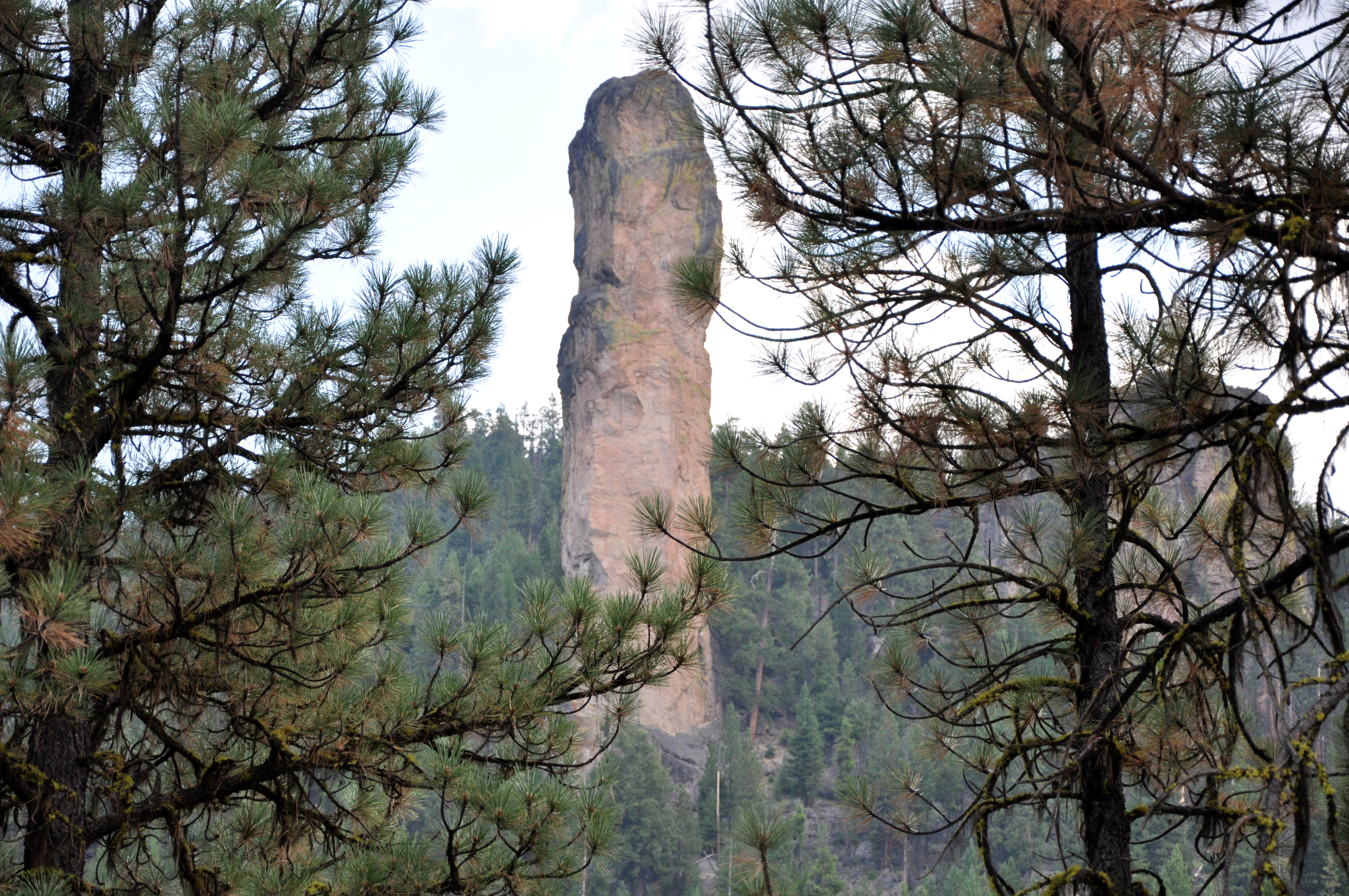
- Steins Pillar in ponderosa pine forest

Highest point
- Peak: Lookout Mountain
- Elevation: 6,926 ft (2,111 m)
- Coordinates: 44°19′37″N 120°22′24″W

Dimensions
- Length: 114 mi (183 km) north–south
- Width: 86 mi (138 km)

Geography
- Location within Oregon
- Country: United States
- State: Oregon
- Counties: Crook, Wheeler and Grant
- Range coordinates: 44°26′35″N 120°23′37″W
- Parent range: Blue Mountains province

Geology
- Rock ages: Permian, Triassic, Jurassic and Eocene
- Rock types: Accreted and erupted igneous rock

The Ochoco Mountains are a mountain range in central Oregon in the United States, located at the western end of the Blue Mountains. They were formed when Permian, Triassic, and Jurassic rocks were slowly uplifted by volcanic eruptions to form the Clarno Formation. Today, the highest point in the range is Lookout Mountain. The dominant vegetation on the west side of the range is old-growth ponderosa pine; on the east side, western juniper is common. The western area of the mountains is administered by the Ochoco National Forest, while the southeastern section is part of the Malheur National Forest. The Ochoco Mountains draw visitors for hiking, camping, bird watching, rockhounding, and hunting, as well as cross-country skiing in the winter.

== Geography ==
The Ochoco Mountains run 114 miles (183 km) north to south and 86 miles (138 km) east to west. The eight highest peaks in the range are:

- Lookout Mountain, 6,926 ft (2,111 m)
- Spanish Peak, 6,871 ft (2,094 m)
- Mount Pisgah, 6,816 ft (2,078 m)
- Round Mountain, 6,755 ft (2,059 m)
- East Point, 6,625 ft (2,019 m)
- North Point, 6,607 ft (2,014 m)
- Wolf Mountain, 6,483 ft (1,976 m)
- View Point, 6,266 ft (1,910 m)

== Geology ==
The Ochoco Mountains in central Oregon form the western end of the Blue Mountains. The Blue Mountains are not a single cohesive range, but rather a complex of ranges and inter-mountain basins and valleys that extend from southeast Washington into central Oregon, ending near Prineville. The Ochoco portion of the province is part of a wide uplifted plateau made of rocks from the Permian, Triassic, and Jurassic periods (300 to 200 million years old) that were transported by the Pacific Plate and accreted in the late Mesozoic era (about 100 million years ago) as part of a vast shallow sea, then slowly uplifted by volcanic eruptions during the Eocene epoch (50 to 37 million years ago) to form the Clarno Formation. From 37 to 17 million years ago, eruptions in the western Cascade Range spread ash across eastern Oregon, forming the John Day Formation. From 17 to 14 million years ago, major volcanic eruptions covered much of the province with basalt flows, creating the Columbia River Basalt Group. Since then, continued faulting and uplift has resulted in a deeply eroded landscape. Steins Pillar, known colloquially as The Big One, is an excellent example of this erosion.

During the Eocene epoch, central Oregon volcanoes deposited layers of lava and ash up to 1,000 feet (300 m) thick over the area that is now the Ochoco Mountains. Large mudflows called lahars were also common during that period. These mudflows often covered and preserved the plants and animals, resulting in fossil beds. Today, fossils of prehistoric trees, fruits, nuts, and flowers can be found in the Ochoco Mountains along with fossilized animals including horses, camels, rhinoceros, and hippopotami.

== Ecology ==
The vegetation in the Ochoco Mountains ranges from old-growth ponderosa pine on the western slopes and in the mountain valleys to western juniper and sagebrush on the eastern and southern slopes. The high mountain meadows host a wide variety of wild flowers and even ferns in some areas. Big Summit Prairie near the center of the Ochocos is well known for its spring wild flower displays.

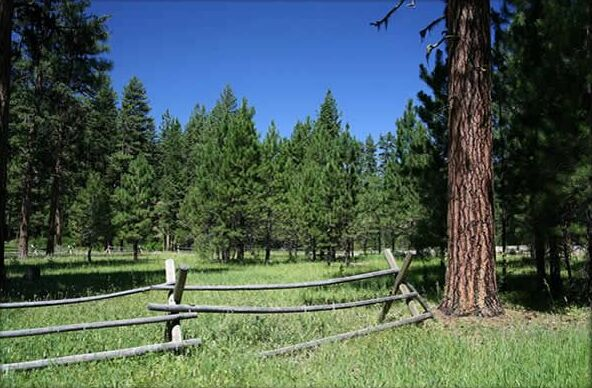
Ponderosa pine forest in the Deep Springs area

Ponderosa pine is the dominant tree species in most parts of the Ochoco Mountains. These pines are common at elevations from 3,000 to 6,000 feet (910 to 1,830 m) above sea level. Manzanita, antelope bitterbrush, and ceanothus are common shrubs in the pine-dominated areas with Idaho fescue and Ross' sedge as the main ground cover. Ponderosa pine forests are tolerant of drought and low-intensity wildfires. Birds commonly found in the pine forests of the Ochoco Mountains include the northern flicker, hairy woodpecker, red-tailed hawk, and Steller's jay. Central Oregon's ponderosa pine forests are an important winter range for mule deer and Rocky Mountain elk.

On the drier, eastern side of the Ochoco Mountains, the western juniper trees survive on as little as 8 inches (200 mm) of precipitation per year. The range's juniper woodlands cover wide areas from 3,000 to 4,000 feet (910 to 1,220 m) in elevation. Antelope bitterbrush and sagebrush are common shrubs in these areas with Idaho fescue and bluebunch wheatgrass as the main ground cover. Juniper woodlands are home to mountain bluebirds, Townsend's solitaires, and ferruginous hawks during the spring and summer. There are also many small mammals and lizards that are prey for coyote.

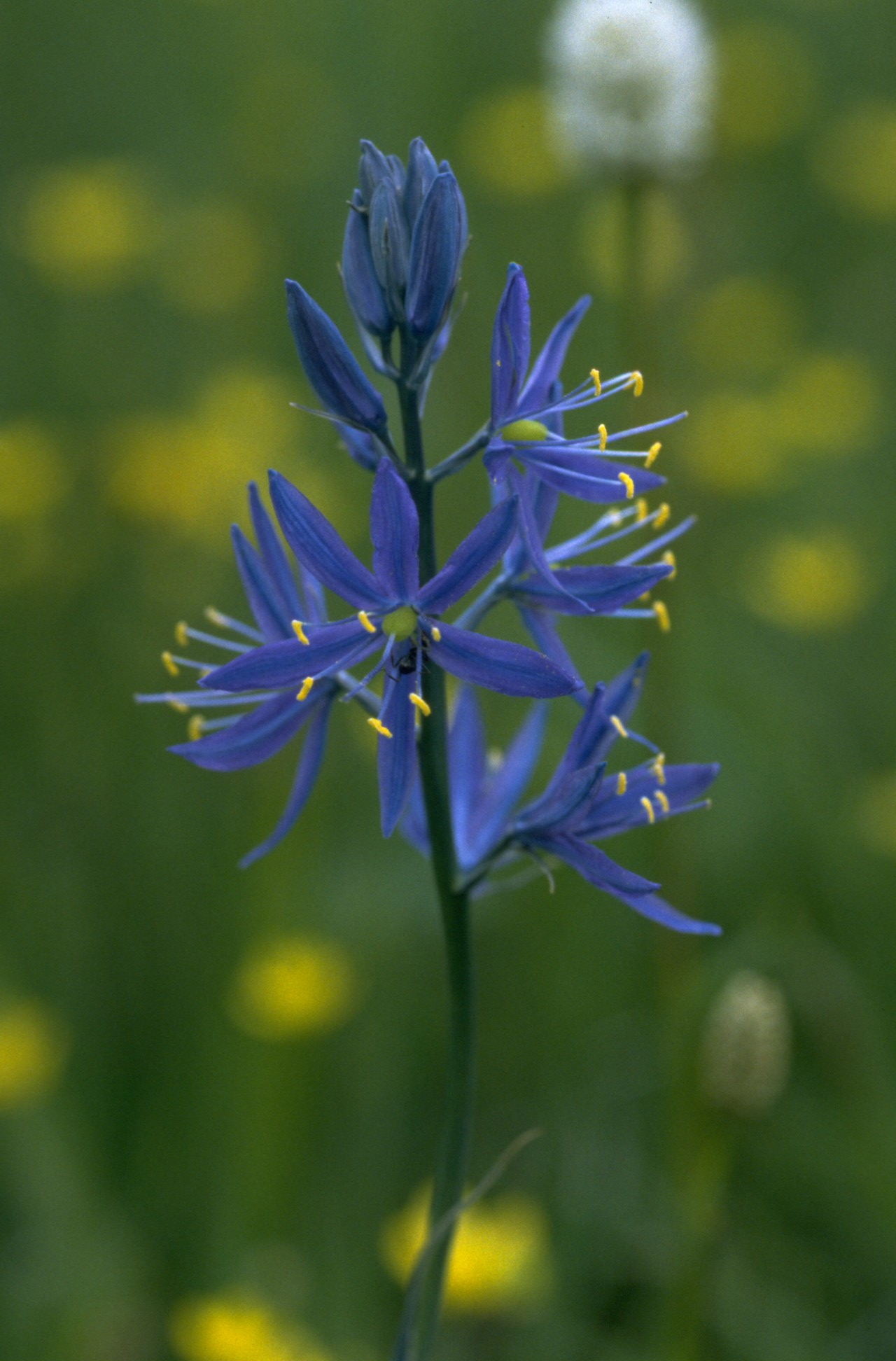
Camas flower at Big Summit Prairie

Big Summit Prairie is a large high-country meadow covering 20 square miles (52 km^{2}) in the middle of the Ochoco Mountains. The prairie is covered by water-loving grasses, overgrown by willows and shrubs in some areas. Tufted hairgrass, elephant's head, and horsetail are common ground cover in the meadowlands. Quaking aspen with shrubby undergrowth attract wildlife not found in other parts of the Ochoco Mountains. Common birds include sandhill crane, Wilson's snipe, long-billed curlew, and northern harrier. Even the rare dickcissel has been sighted at Big Summit Prairie. Larger animals include mule deer, pronghorn, Belding's ground squirrel, northern pocket gopher, meadow mice, and coyotes. Also, Rocky Mountain elk move into the area in the fall.

Big Summit Prairie is particularly well known for its wildflowers and butterflies. From April through June, flowers cover Big Summit meadow. The first wildflowers to bloom are usually grass widow, wild parsley, and shooting stars. From May through June, Wyethia, buttercups, and camas display their colors. In drier areas, bitterroot bloom with large white and pink flowers. In June and July, other flowers take over the display including Missouri iris, larkspur, Indian paintbrush, checkermallow, and arrowleaf balsamroot. One notable plant is Peck's mariposa lily, a type of Calochortus with lavender petals. This plant is found only in the Ochoco Mountains. Butterfly species common to the Big Summit Prairie include hairstreak, skipper, eastern tailed-blue, Lycaenidae, checkerspot, fritillary, swallowtail, admiral, and tortoiseshell.

== Human uses ==
Most of the Ochoco Mountains are public lands administered by the United States Forest Service. The Ochoco National Forest is responsible for most of the mountain area; however, the southeastern part of the range is in the Malheur National Forest. Some land in the Ochoco area is also administered by the Bureau of Land Management. Hiking, fishing, camping, hunting, horseback riding, bird watching, and rockhounding are all popular activities.

The Ochoco National Forest maintains 27 campgrounds in or near the Ochoco Mountains. The largest are the Antelope Flat Reservoir, Ochoco Divide, Walton Lake, and Wildcat campgrounds. The Malheur National Forest has several campgrounds in the Ochoco Mountains as well. The largest is the campground at Delintment Lake.

- Antelope Flat Reservoir campground has 24 campsites surrounded by a scenic ponderosa pine forest. The reservoir is not visible from the campground, but it is only a 10-minute walk to the lake shore. The campground is at 4,600 feet (1,400 m) above sea level. Potable water is available at the site along with picnic tables, fire pits, and vault toilets. The area is lightly used except on holiday weekends. Fishing, swimming, boating, and hiking are favorite activities.
- Ochoco Divide Campground is located in an old-growth ponderosa pine forest just off U.S. Highway 26, 30 miles (48 km) east of Prineville. The campground is located at 4,600 feet (1,400 m) above sea level. It has 28 campsites, picnic tables, fire pits, and vault toilets. The campground is commonly used as an overnight stop for highway travelers, who then move on in the morning. As a result, the campground is often full at night but very quiet during the day. Bandit Springs highway rest stop is one mile (1.6 km) west of the campground. The rest stop is the trailhead for several hiking trails. These trails are popular for hiking and mountain biking in the summer and cross-country skiing in the winter.
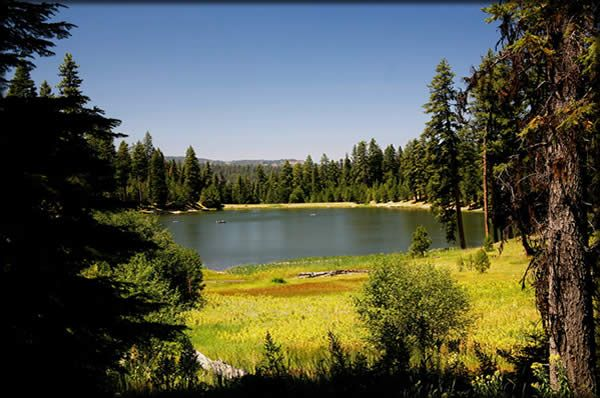
- Walton Lake and meadow in the Ochoco Mountains
  Walton Lake is a small lake surrounded by old-growth ponderosa pine and mountain meadows. The lake is stocked with rainbow trout each summer. Two hiking trails are located in the area. The Walton Lake Trail is a one-mile loop around the lake while Round Mountain National Scenic Trail is a 7.5-mile (12.1 km) hike that offers the opportunity to see high-country wildlife and many varieties of birds. The campground is 5,000 feet (1,500 m) above sea level. The site has potable water, picnic tables, fire pits, level tent sites, and vault toilets. There is also a day-use picnic area with two tables, cooking grills, a sandy lake shore beach, and a fishing pier. Fishing, swimming, boating, and hiking are popular activities at Walton Lake.
- Wildcat Campground is located at the southwest corner of the Mill Creek Wilderness, approximately 19 miles (31 km) from Prineville. The campground is at an elevation of 3,700 feet (1,100 m). It has 17 sites, potable water, picnic tables, fire pits, and vault toilets. A trailhead leading into the Mill Creek Wilderness is located adjacent to the campground. It connects to a network of hiking trails in the Mill Creek and Twin Pillars areas.
- Delintment Lake Campground is located 45 miles (72 km) northwest of Burns. The campground is 5,600 feet (1,700 m) above sea level. It has 33 sites, potable water from a hand-pump, 12 picnic sites, and vault toilets. Hiking, fishing, swimming, boating, and wildlife viewing are popular activities at Delintment Lake.

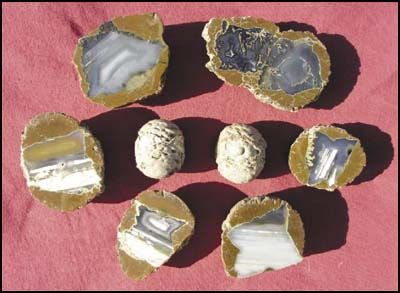
Thundereggs like these are found at Whistle Springs.

The unique geology of the Ochoco Mountains is such that a wide variety of rock types are located in a relatively small area. This brings rockhounds to the area every summer. The Bureau of Land Management and the Ochoco National Forest both have designated areas where rockhounds can search for agate, jasper, petrified wood, petrified moss, and dendrite. These rock collection sites are for personal use only; gathering rocks for commercial purposes is prohibited. Thundereggs can be found at Whistle Springs. Even though the area has been worked by rockhounds for many years, quality thundereggs are still found at the site. There are also some rare rocks and minerals in central Oregon in or near the Ochoco Mountains, including opals, amethyst, gem quality calcite, cinnabar, selenite, gypsum, and amygdaloid nodules.

== Wilderness areas ==
The Ochoco National Forest has three wilderness areas in the Ochoco Mountains. They are the Bridge Creek Wilderness, the Black Canyon Wilderness, and the Mill Creek Wilderness.

- The Bridge Creek Wilderness is very remote, and at 5,400 acres (22 km^{2}), it is the smallest wilderness in Oregon. It has few visitors except during the fall hunting season. Its topography is dominated by steep, forested slopes and barren plateaus, although it has some mountain meadow lands as well. The wilderness contains important winter elk habitat along Bridge Creek. Other large mammals common to the area include mule deer, black bear, and cougar. Pileated woodpecker, goshawks, and prairie falcons nest in the Bridge Creek area. There are no trails in the Bridge Creek Wilderness, so this area is for experienced outdoorsmen.
- The Black Canyon Wilderness encompasses 13,400 acres (54 km^{2}) with elevations ranging from 3,900 to 6,400 feet (1,200 to 2,000 m) above sea level. The Black Canyon environment ranges from dense forest to steep basalt cliffs. The Black Canyon Wilderness is home to a wide range of wildlife including deer, elk, black bear, and cougar. Wildflowers such as crimson columbine, lupine, and Indian paintbrush can be found throughout the wilderness. There are several hiking trails, all very rugged.
- The Mill Creek Wilderness includes 17,000 acres (69 km^{2}) of protected land. The wilderness is characterized by deep canyons and towering pinnacles including a pair of volcanic plugs called the Twin Pillars. These two rock outcroppings are found along the Twin Pillars Trail National Recreational Trail. The trailhead is at Wildcat Campground, just outside the wilderness boundary. The Mill Creek Wilderness has a 21-mile (34 km) network of trails. The trails are used by both hikers and horse riders; however, the entire trail system is extremely rugged with many steep climbs and descents. The wilderness is dense pine and fir forest dissected by Mill Creek and its tributaries. Elk and deer are common in the Mill Creek area, as are black bear, wild turkey, pileated woodpeckers, and goshawks. In the fall, the Mill Creek Wilderness is a popular area for hunters.
