= List of Oregon National Forests =

The U.S. state of Oregon contains eleven national forests.

Name	Location	Area (acres)	Area (km^{2})	Established	Annual visitors (2006)
Deschutes	Deschutes, Klamath, Lake, and Jefferson counties	1,596,900	6,462	July 1, 1908	3,162,000
Fremont–Winema	Lake, Klamath counties	2,252,587	9,115.90	2002	428,000
Malheur	Grant, Harney, Baker, and Malheur counties	1,465,287	5,929.81	July 1, 1908	242,000
Mount Hood	Clackamas, Hood River, Wasco, Multnomah, Marion, and Jefferson counties	1,071,466	4,336.07	July 1, 1908	4,400,000
Ochoco	Crook, Harney, Wheeler, Grant counties	851,033	3,444.01	July 1, 1911	575,000
Rogue River–Siskiyou	Coos, Curry, Douglas, Jackson, Josephine, and Klamath counties in Oregon; Del Norte, and Siskiyou counties in California	1,723,179	6,973.46	2004 (1906)	916,000
Siuslaw	Lane, Lincoln, Tillamook, Douglas, Yamhill, Benton, Coos, and Polk counties	634,207	2,566.54	July 1, 1908	1,017,000
Umatilla	Umatilla, Grant, Columbia, Morrow, Wallowa, Union, Wheeler counties in Oregon; Garfield, Asotin, Walla Walla counties of Washington	1,407,087	5,694.28	July 1, 1908	703,000
Umpqua	Douglas, Jackson, Lane counties	983,129	3,978.58	July 2, 1907	799,000
Wallowa–Whitman	Wallowa, Baker, Union, Grant, and Umatilla counties	2,392,508	9,682.14	May 6, 1905	505,000
Willamette	Lane, Linn, Marion, Douglas, Clackamas, and Jefferson counties	1,675,407	6,780.13	July 1, 1933	1,740,000
Total		16,784,978	67,926.40		14,487,000

== See also ==
- Lists of Oregon-related topics
