= Mill Creek Wilderness =

Wilderness area in the Ochoco National Forest, Oregon, United States

- IUCN category Ib (wilderness area)
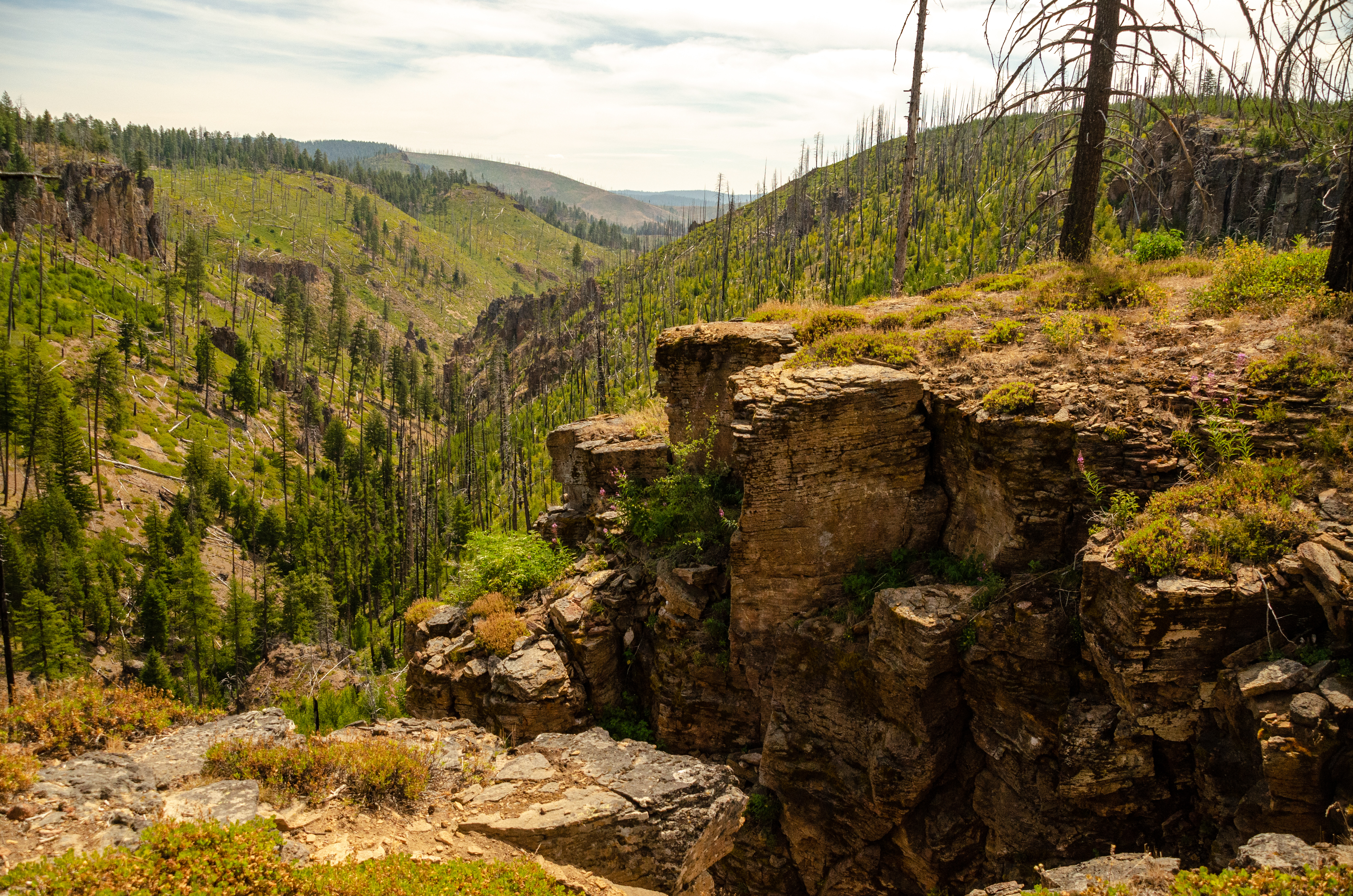
- canyon view along the Twin Pillars Trail

- Location within Oregon
- Location: Crook County, Oregon, United States
- Nearest city: Prineville, Oregon
- Coordinates: 44°28′39″N 120°31′33″W
- Area: 17,400 acres (7,040 ha)
- Established: 1984
- Governing body: U.S. Forest Service

Mill Creek Wilderness is a wilderness area located in the Ochoco National Forest of central Oregon. It was established in 1984 and comprises 17,400 acres (7,040 ha). Of the three wilderness areas in the Ochoco National Forest - Mill Creek, Bridge Creek, and Black Canyon - Mill Creek is the largest and most heavily used.

The first sawmill in Crook County was located on Mill Creek, hence its name.

== Topography ==
Mill Creek Wilderness consists of towering stone pinnacles, steep canyons, barren ridge tops, and high elevation meadows. A unique feature of this wilderness is the pair of volcanic plugs called Twin Pillars. The northwest corner of the Wilderness is Bingham Prairie, an almost flat plateau with open meadows and a lodgepole pine forest. Mill Creek drains approximately 85% of the Wilderness, with Marks Creek drainage accounting for the difference. Both creeks are tributaries of Ochoco Creek.

== Geology ==
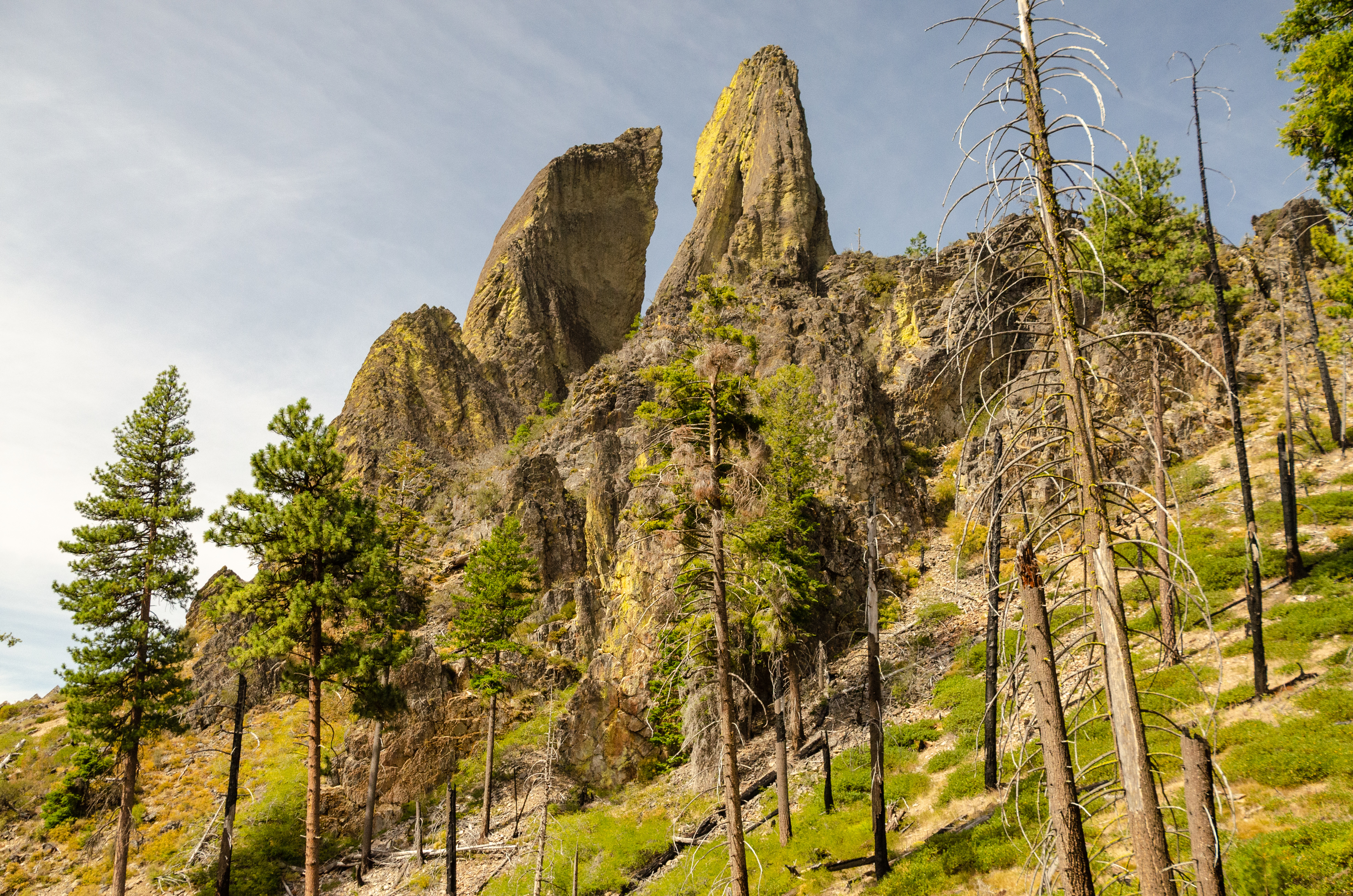
Twin Pillars

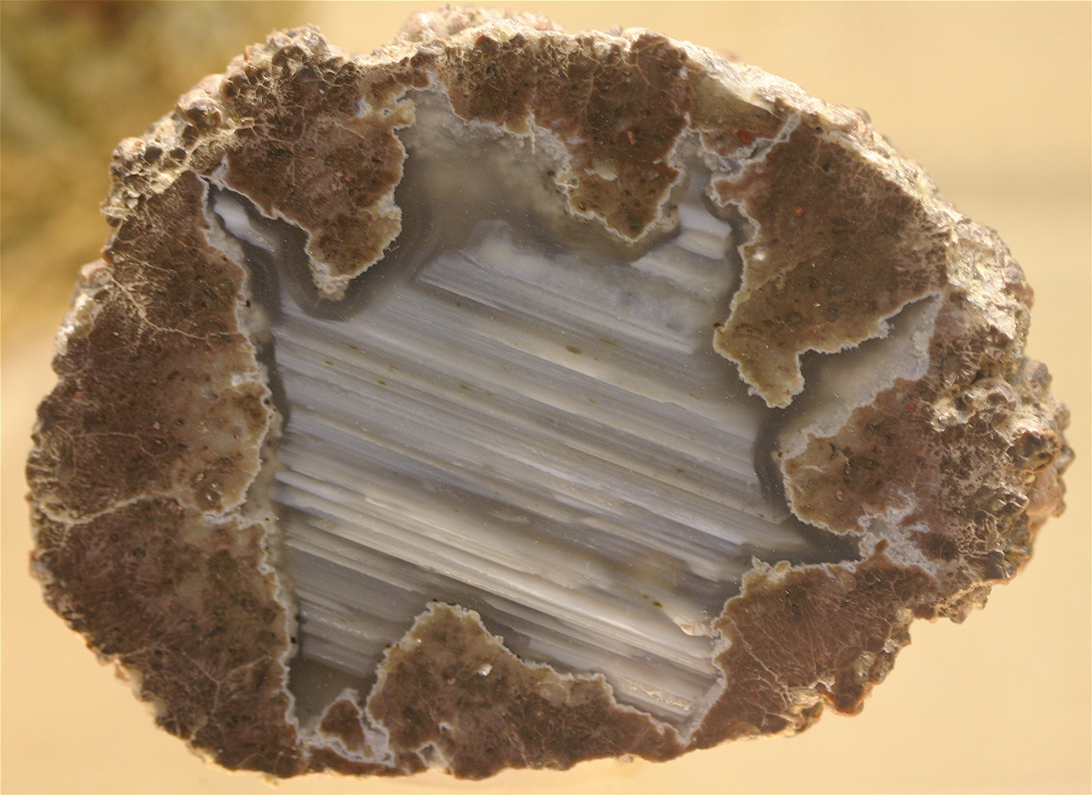
Oregon thunderegg

Mill Creek Wilderness features some unique geological features. Popular among visitors are the 200-foot (61 m) tall volcanic plugs in the northwest portion of the Wilderness, Twin Pillars. Thundereggs, the state rock of Oregon, have been found in the Wilderness at Desolation Canyon and just outside the boundary at Steins Pillar. Rockhounding is no longer permitted.

There are several gemstone mining claims located in Mill Creek Wilderness. The claims are all small surface operations and access is provided by primitive roads.

== Vegetation ==
A mix of conifer tree species account for approximately 84% of the forested area of Mill Creek Wilderness. The northwest corner plateau area, Bingham Prairie, is mostly forested with lodgepole pine, which have recently been attacked by the mountain pine beetle, causing some trees to die. In August and September 2000, the Hash Rock Fire burned 14,236 acres (5,761 ha) of the Mill Creek Wilderness. However, the area is quickly recovering and currently contains examples of an exemplary climax forest of ponderosa pine. Other plants in Mill Creek Wilderness include aster (genus), bull thistle, snowberry, and both native and non-native species of grass.

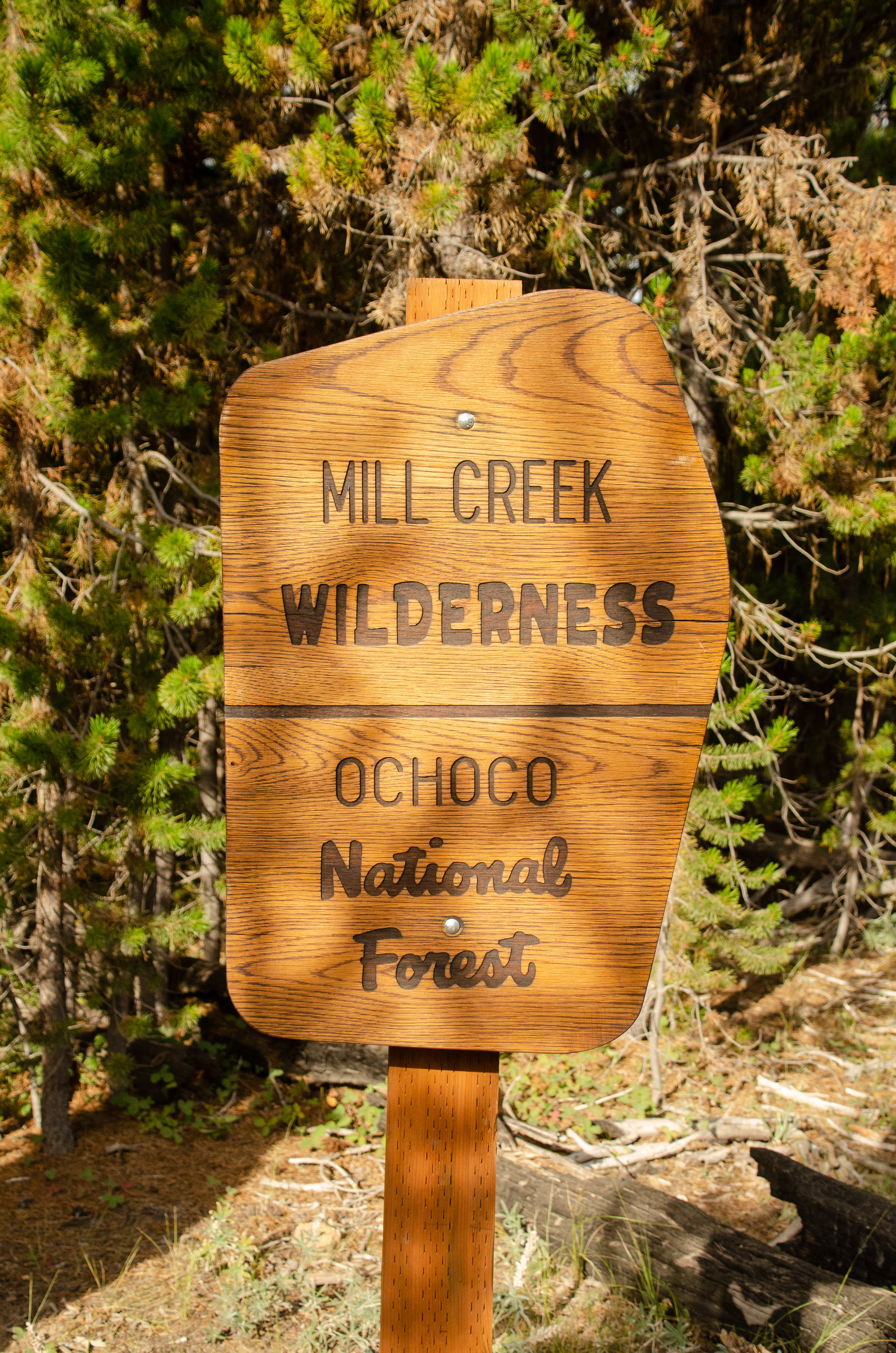
Wilderness sign

== Wildlife ==
Mill Creek Wilderness is home to a variety of wildlife, including black bear, wild turkey, pileated woodpecker, goshawk, elk, mule deer, bobcat, and mountain lion. The Wilderness is popular with big game hunters during the fall, and anglers often seek the small rainbow trout that inhabit its perennial streams.

== See also ==
- List of Oregon Wildernesses
- List of U.S. Wilderness Areas
