= Maury Mountains =

Mountain range in Oregon, United States

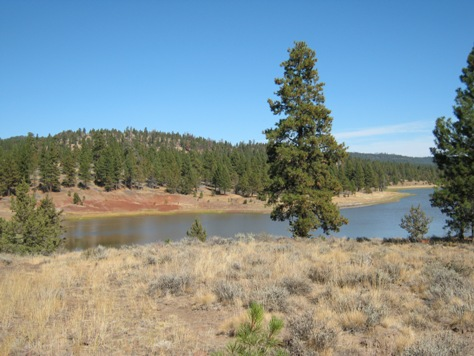
- Antelope Flat Reservoir in the Maury Mountains

Highest point
- Elevation: 1,909 m (6,263 ft)

Geography
- Location within Oregon Location within the United States
- Country: United States
- State: Oregon
- District: Crook County
- Range coordinates: 44°1′58.478″N 120°25′5.987″W
- Topo map: USGS Mule Deer Ridge

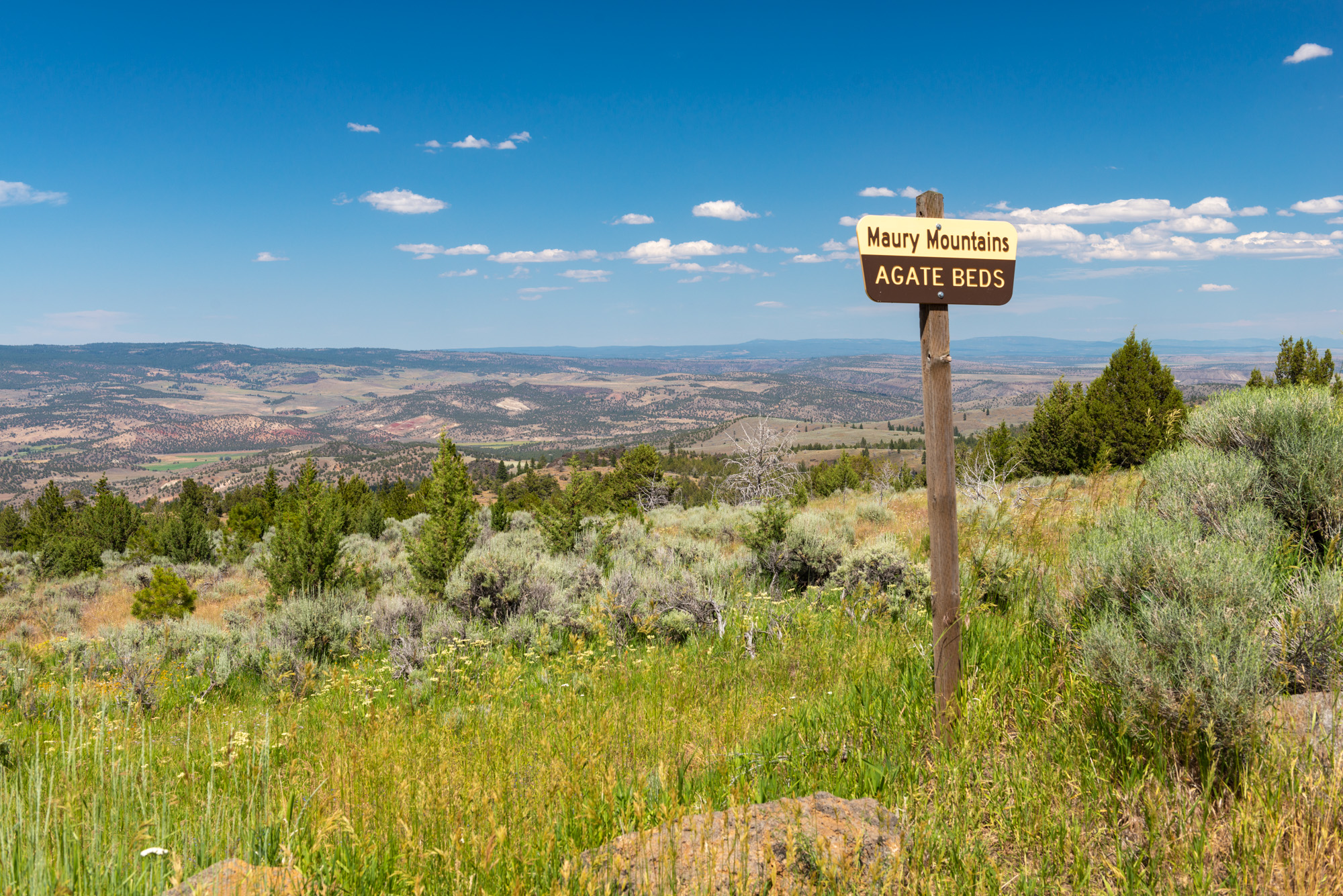
Maury Mountains Agate Beds

The Maury Mountains are a mountain range in Crook County, Oregon. Much of the range is within the Ochoco National Forest. Outstanding features of the range are the Maury Mountains Agate Beds and Antelope Flat Reservoir.
