= North Fork Crooked River =

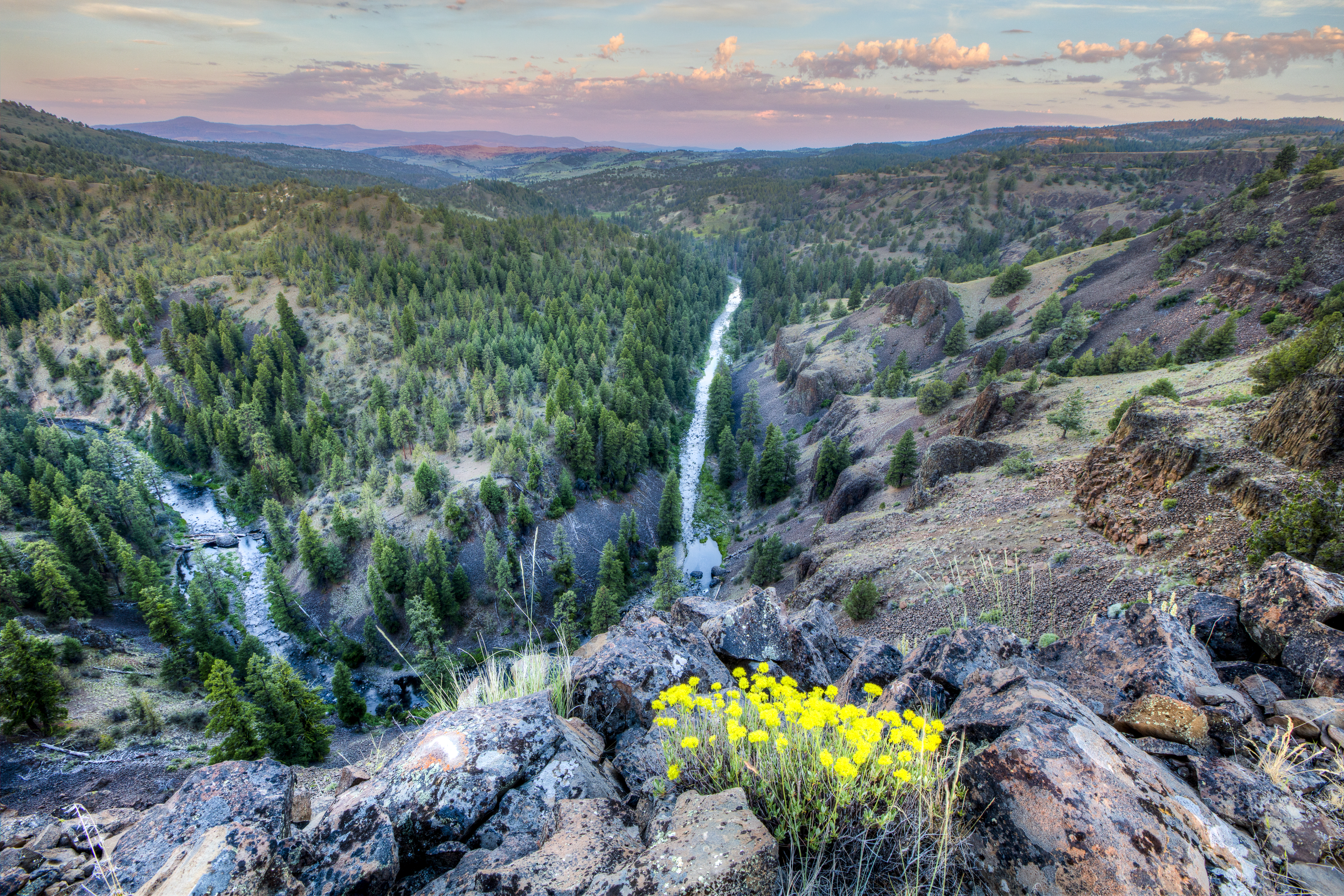

- Location of the mouth of North Fork Crooked River in Oregon

Location
- Country: United States
- State: Oregon
- County: Crook

Physical characteristics
- Source: Ochoco National Forest
  - location: Ochoco Mountains
  - coordinates: 44°14′05″N 120°12′51″W
- Mouth: Crooked River
  - location: between Post and Paulina
  - coordinates: 44°07′01″N 120°14′43″W
- Length: 46 mi (74 km)
- Basin size: 323 sq mi (840 km^{2})
- Discharge
  - average: 368 cu ft/s (10.4 m^{3}/s)

National Wild and Scenic River
- Type: Wild, Scenic, Recreational
- Designated: October 28, 1988

The North Fork Crooked River is a tributary, 46 miles (74 km) long, of the Crooked River in the U.S. state of Oregon. Beginning in the Ochoco National Forest and the Ochoco Mountains east of Prineville, it flows north, then east, then south-southwest to meet the larger stream between Post and Paulina. The confluence is 111 miles (179 km) upstream of where the Crooked River flows into the Deschutes River.

In 1988, Congress added a large fraction of the river to the National Wild and Scenic Rivers System. About 12 miles (19 km) were designated "wild", about 8 miles (13 km) "scenic", and about 13 miles (21 km) "recreational". About 8 miles (13 km) of the upper river flowing through Big Summit Prairie was excluded from the Wild Rivers designation. It is private land used as livestock pasture.

== See also ==
- List of National Wild and Scenic Rivers
- List of rivers of Oregon
