= Crooked River National Grassland =

Protected area in Jefferson County, Oregon

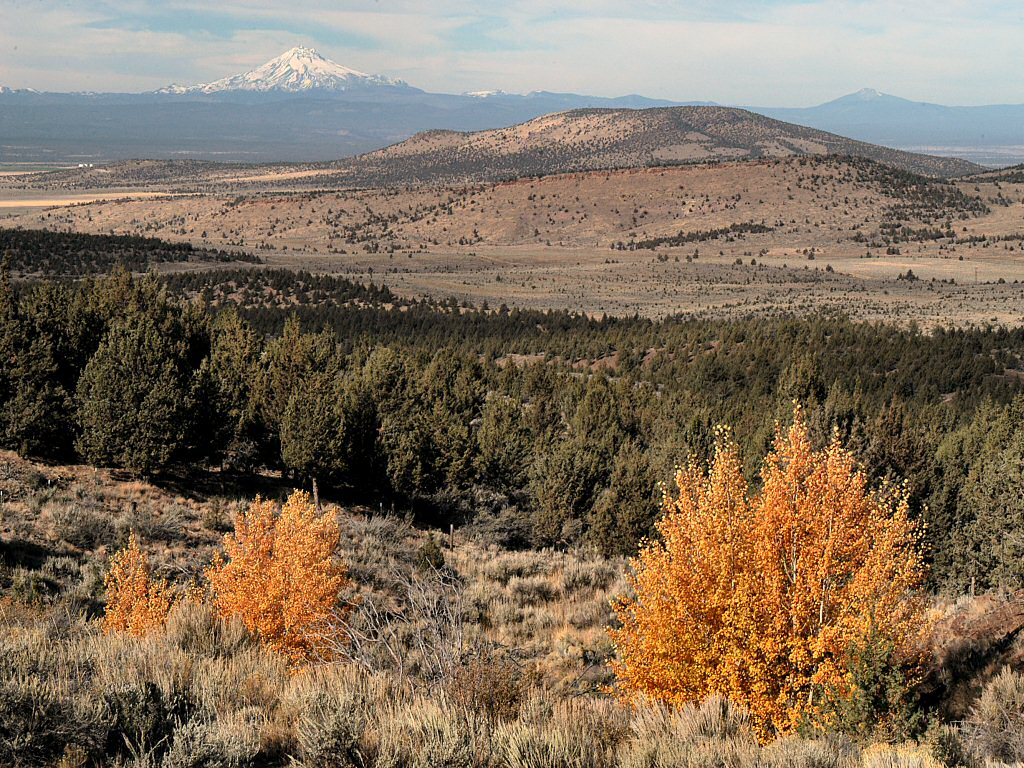

- Location within the United States
- Location: Jefferson County, Oregon, United States
- Nearest city: Madras, Oregon
- Coordinates: 44.54°N 121.11°W
- Area: 173,629 acres (702.65 km^{2})
- Governing body: U.S. Forest Service
- Website: Ochoco National Forest & Crooked River National Grassland

Crooked River National Grassland is a National Grassland located in Jefferson County in the north-central part of the U.S. state of Oregon. It has a land area of 173,629 acres (70,265 ha). It contains two National Wild and Scenic Rivers, the Deschutes River and the Crooked River. The grassland is managed together with the Ochoco National Forest from Forest Service offices in Prineville. There are local ranger district offices located in Madras, its nearest city.

== Gallery ==
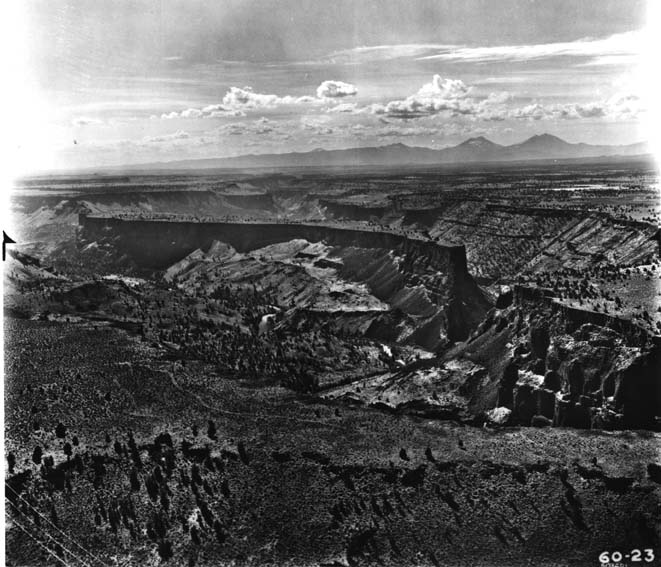
"The Island", isolated by the canyons of the Deschutes and Crooked rivers.

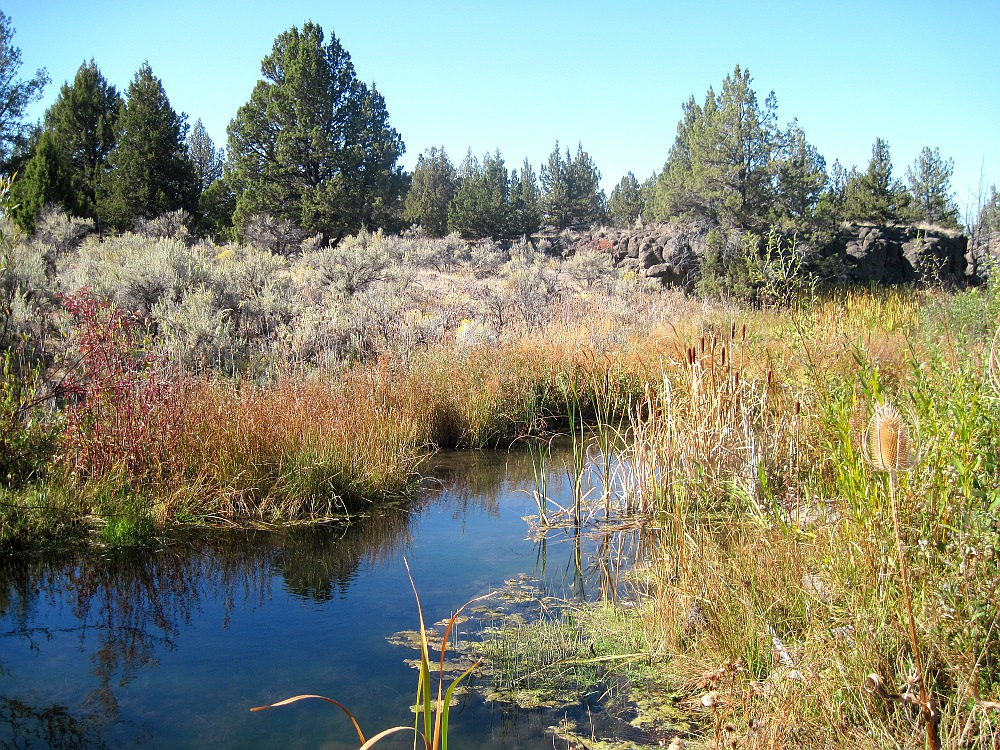

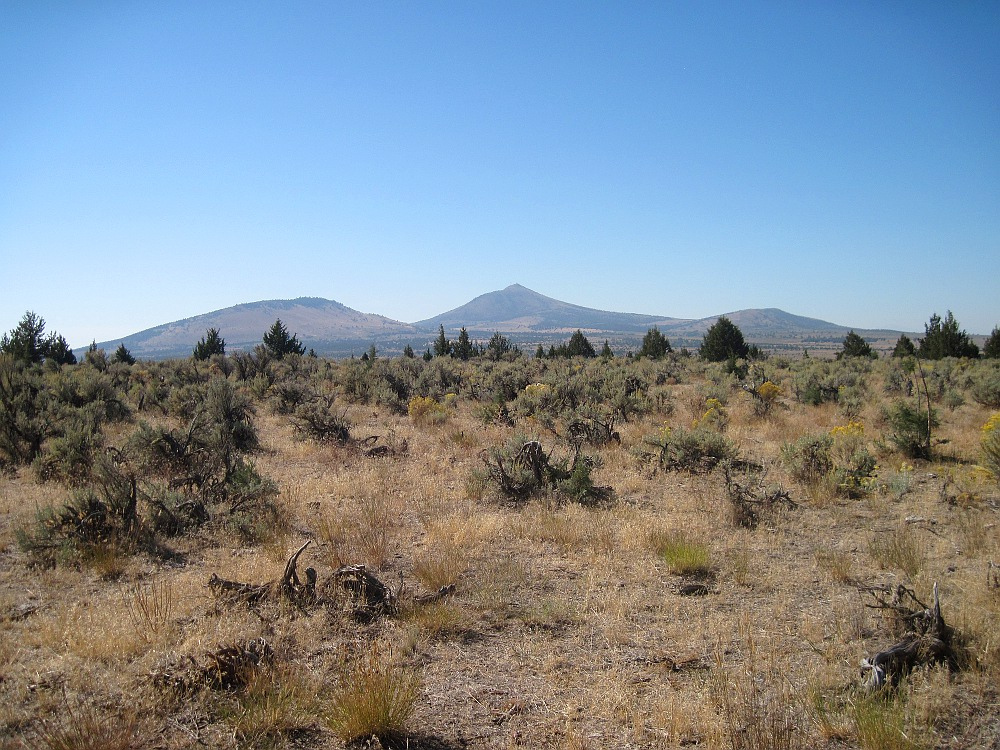
