= Antelope Flat Reservoir =

Reservoir in Crook County, Oregon

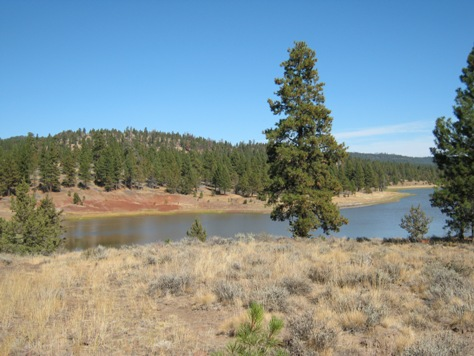
- Antelope Flat Reservoir

- Location of Antelope Flat Reservoir in Oregon, USA. Antelope Flat Reservoir (the United States)
- Location: Crook County, Oregon
- Coordinates: 44.00458°N 120.39361°W
- Type: reservoir
- Primary inflows: Bear Creek
- Primary outflows: Bear Creek
- Basin countries: United States
- Max. length: 1.25 miles (2.01 km)
- Max. width: 0.55 miles (0.89 km)
- Surface area: 170 acres (69 ha)
- Average depth: 11 feet (3.4 m)
- Max. depth: 28 feet (8.5 m)
- Water volume: 2,000 acre-feet (2,500,000 m^{3})
- Surface elevation: 4,984 feet (1,519 m)

Antelope Flat Reservoir is an impoundment located in the southern part of the Maury Mountains in Crook County, Oregon. It is formed by a 33-foot (10 m) high earth-fill dam built across Bear Creek for irrigation purposes. The western part of the lake is within the Ochoco National Forest. Though it covers 170 acres (69 ha) when full, and has a storage capacity of almost 2,000 acre-feet (2,500,000 m^{3}) with a maximum depth of 28 feet (8.5 m) and average depth of 11 feet (3.4 m), the reservoir is often not filled to capacity, especially late in the irrigation season. The lake resides at an elevation of 4,984 feet (1,519 m). A boat-launch ramp is located at the lake's western end, and a 24-unit campground lies just up the hill from there.

== See also ==
- List of lakes in Oregon
