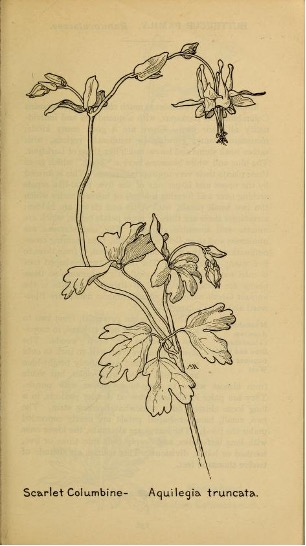

Scientific classification
- Kingdom: Plantae
- Clade: Tracheophytes
- Clade: Angiosperms
- Clade: Eudicots
- Order: Ranunculales
- Family: Ranunculaceae
- Genus: Aquilegia
- Species: A. formosa
- Variety: A. f. var. truncata

Trinomial name
- Aquilegia formosa var. truncata (Fisch. & C.A.Mey.) Baker

Synonyms
- List: Aquilegia canadensis f. truncata (Fisch. & C.A.Mey.) Rapaics; Aquilegia formosa subsp. truncata (Fisch. & C.A.Mey.) Payson; Aquilegia formosa f. truncata (Fisch. & C.A.Mey.) Rapaics; Aquilegia truncata Fisch. & C.A.Mey.; Aquilegia formosa var. pauciflora (Greene) Boothman; Aquilegia formosa subsp. pauciflora (Greene) Payson; Aquilegia pauciflora Greene; Aquilegia truncata var. pauciflora (Greene) Jeps.

= Aquilegia formosa var. truncata =

Variety of flowering plant

Aquilegia formosa var. truncata, also known as the red columbine or western columbine, is a perennial flowering plant in the family Ranunculaceae, native to the western United States.

== Description ==
Aquilegia formosa var. truncata is a perennial herbaceous plant growing 50–100 cm (20–39 in) high, with well-developed, light-green stem leaves. The stems and leaf stalks are smooth or sparsely pilose, and not sticky. The flowers are nodding and 1.5 in (38 mm) or more across, with scarlet sepals tinged with yellow and measuring 10–20 mm (0.4–0.8 in) long. The petals measure no more than 3 mm. The flowers have erect, scarlet nectar spurs measuring 0.75 in (19 mm) in length. The follicles are 15–20 mm (0.6–0.8 in) long.

== Taxonomy ==
The plant was initially described as a separate species Aquilegia truncata by Friedrich Ernst Ludwig von Fischer and Carl Anton von Meyer in 1844. It was reassessed as a variety truncata of Aquilegia formosa by John Gilbert Baker in 1844, which is now the generally accepted placement of the taxon.

The type locality is Fort Ross, California. High-altitude forms with short stems and very small stem leaves are often treated as A. formosa var. pauciflora. Similar dwarf montane varieties resembling A. formosa var. formosa occur in the Pacific Northwest, but these have never been separated taxonomically.

=== Etymology ===
The variety name truncata means "cut off, blunt-ended" in Latin.

== Distribution and habitat ==
Aquilegia formosa var. truncata is native to California, Nevada, and southern Oregon. It grows in mesic woods and shrublands, open woods, and shady banks at altitudes from sea level to 3,500 m (11,500 ft).

== Conservation ==
As of January 2025, the variety was listed by NatureServe as No Status Rank (TNR), while the parent species A. formosa was listed as Secure (G5).

In 1935, Aquilegia formosa var. truncata was part of a native restoration process in Yosemite National Park. Enrollees from one of Yosemite's California Conservation Corps camps collected numerous seeds of native fauna, including the red columbine, and planted them along Wawona Road in efforts to stabilize slopes. They used a new method where small trenches were dug laterally along the slopes, seeded, and then filled with duff and topsoil.

== Ecology ==
Aquilegia formosa var. truncata flowers from April to August.
