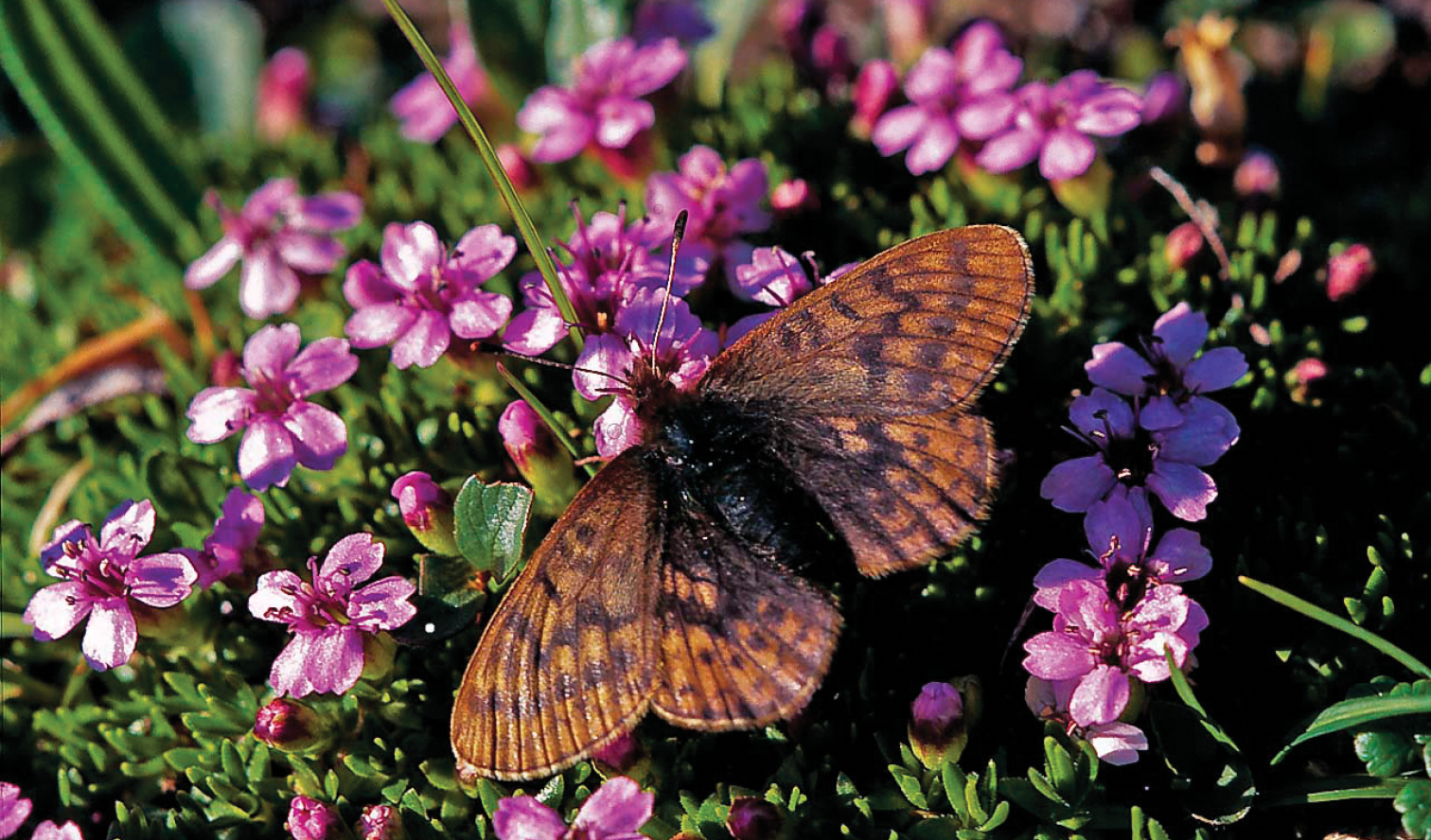

Scientific classification
- Domain: Eukaryota
- Kingdom: Animalia
- Phylum: Arthropoda
- Class: Insecta
- Order: Lepidoptera
- Family: Nymphalidae
- Genus: Boloria
- Species: B. improba

Binomial name
- Boloria improba Butler, 1877

= Boloria improba =

Dingy fritillary

Species of butterfly

Boloria improba, the dingy fritillary, is a butterfly of the family Nymphalidae. In Europe it is only found in small parts of Scandinavia, more specifically the border region between Norway, Sweden and Finland. It is found in alpine or tundra habitats.

The larvae probably feed on Polygonum viviparum in Europe. In North America the food plants are Salix arctica and Salix reticulata nivalis.

== Subspecies ==
The following subspecies are recognized:

- B. i. acrocnema in the San Juan Mountains in southwestern Colorado
- B. i. harryi in the Wind River Mountains in southwestern Wyoming
- B. i. improba in Alaska and northwestern Canada. The Siberian variant which is more yellow are considered the same subspecies, they are called form youngi.
- B. i. improbula northern Scandinavia
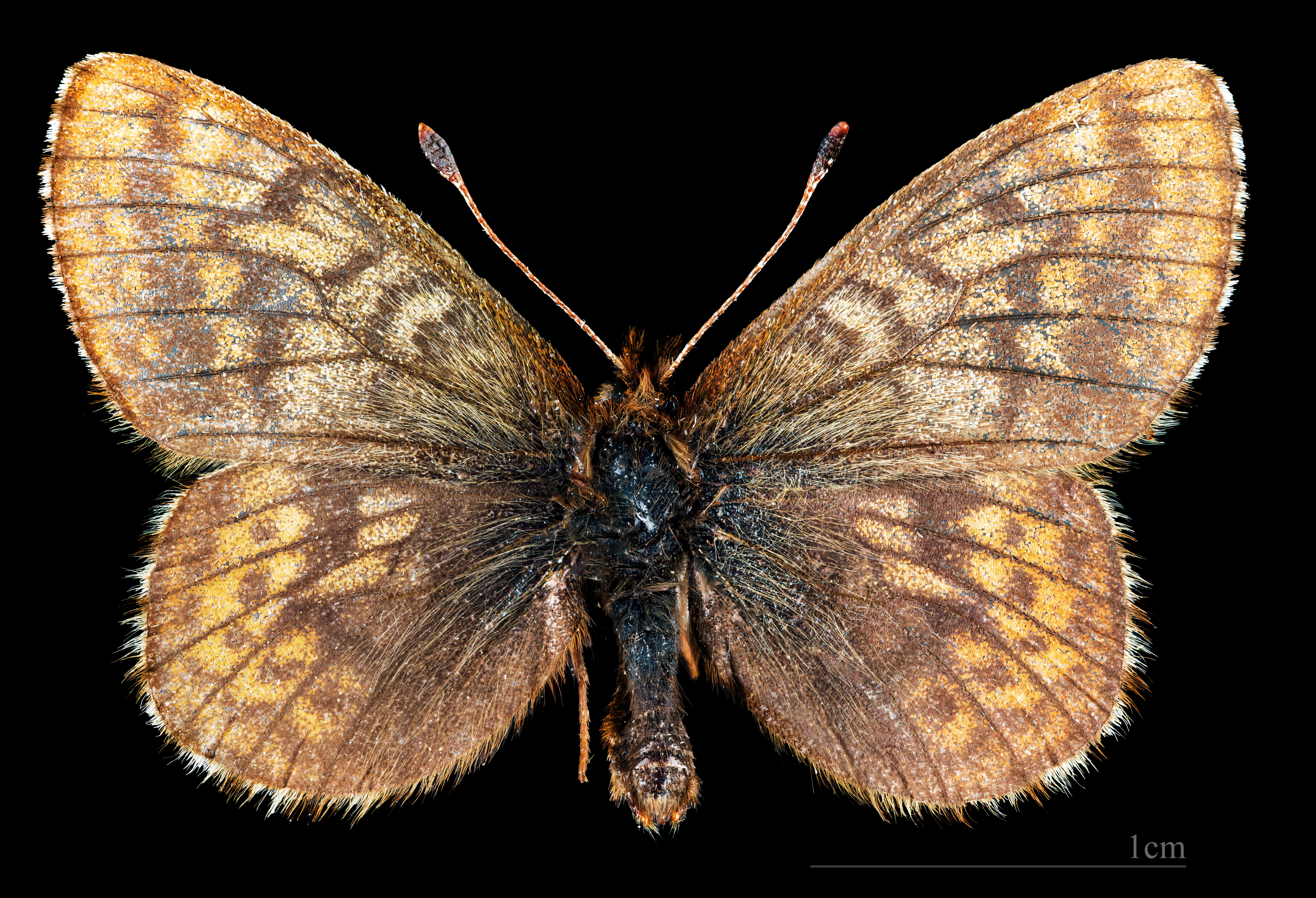
Boloria improba improbula ♂

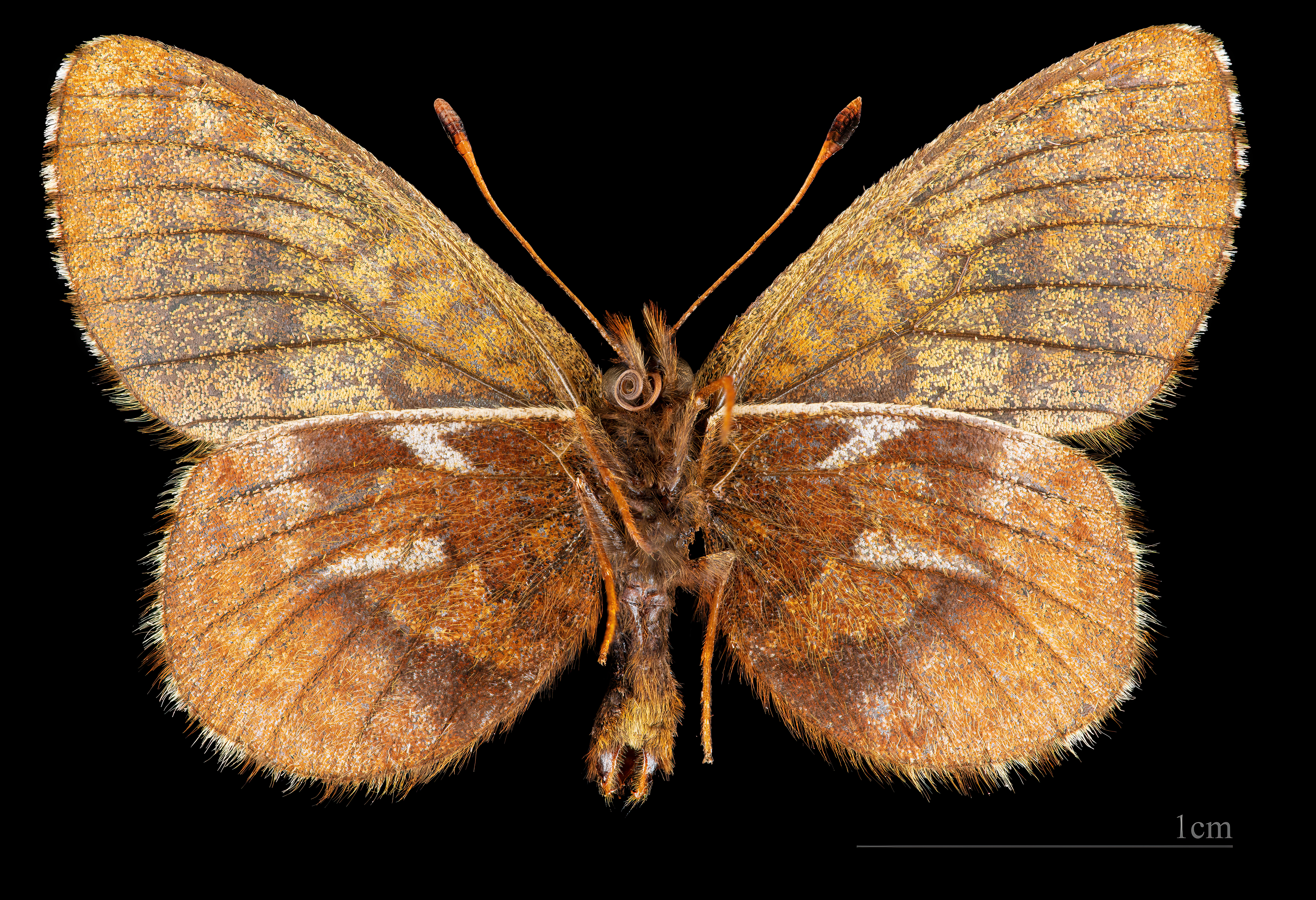
Boloria improba improbula ♂ △
