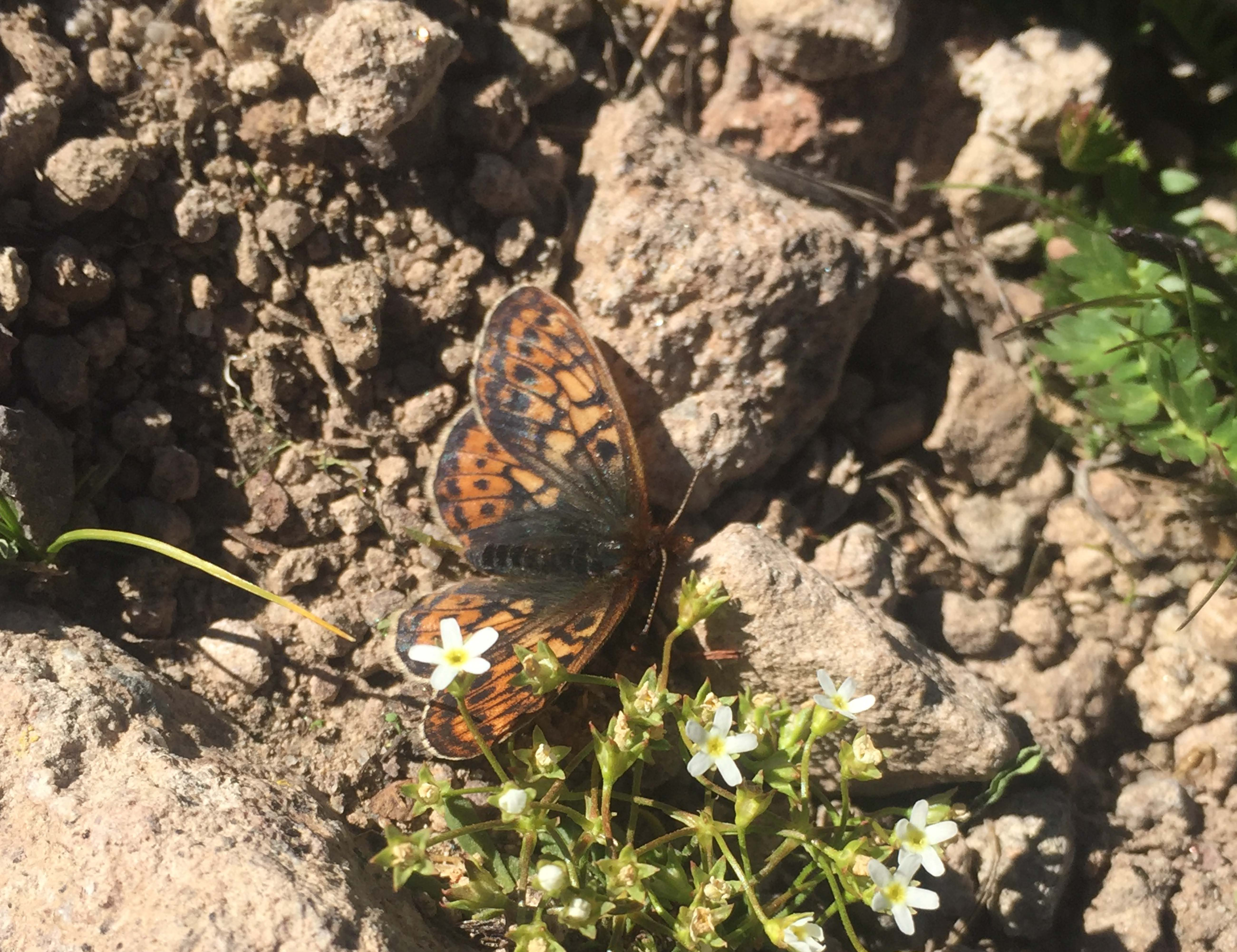

Conservation status
- Endangered (ESA)

Scientific classification
- Kingdom: Animalia
- Phylum: Arthropoda
- Clade: Pancrustacea
- Class: Insecta
- Order: Lepidoptera
- Family: Nymphalidae
- Genus: Boloria
- Species: B. improba
- Subspecies: B. i. acrocnema

Trinomial name
- Boloria improba acrocnema Gall & Sperling, 1980

= Uncompahgre fritillary =

Species of butterfly

The Uncompahgre fritillary butterfly (Boloria improba acrocnema) is a species of butterfly in the Order Lepidoptera: Family Nymphalidae that is endemic to Colorado, USA.

Discovered in the summer of 1978, the Uncompahgre fritillary was first described as a subspecies of Boloria improba, commonly known as the dingy fritillary but further genetic data supported classifying them as a full species.

== Distribution ==
The Uncompahgre fritillary was first found above tree-line at Uncompahgre Peak, located in Hinsdale County, Colorado, USA by Larry Gall, Felix Sperling, Scott Graham, Kathleen Shaw, and Wendy Roberts working out of the Rocky Mountain Biological Laboratory. A few years following, another population was found at Redcloud Peak, about 10 miles south of Uncompahgre Peak.

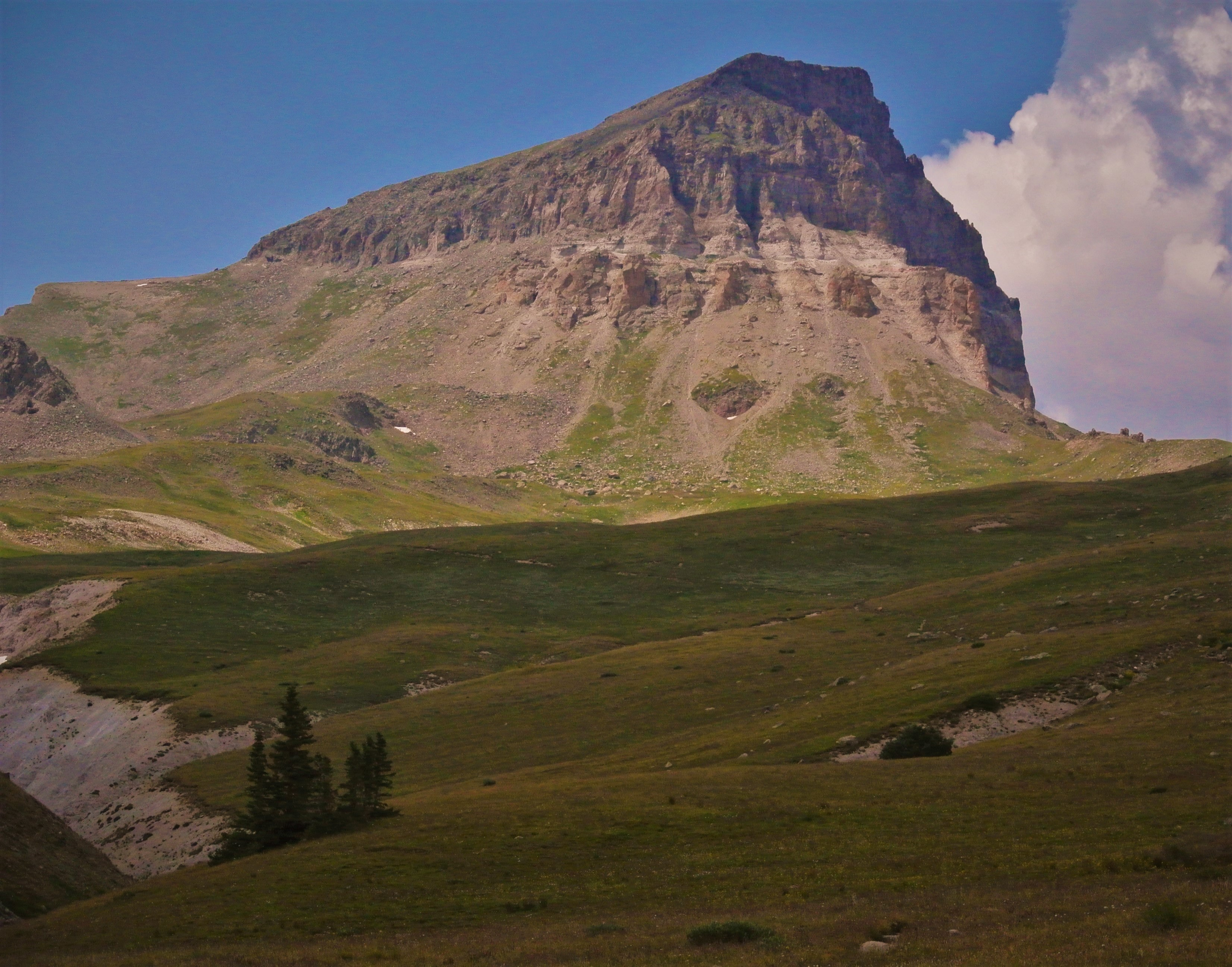
The Uncompahgre fritillary butterfly was discovered in 1978 below Uncompahgre Peak, Colorado, USA

The species is endemic to the northern San Juan Mountains and the southern Sawatch Range in parts of Gunnison County, Hinsdale County, and Chaffee County of southwestern Colorado, USA and has one of the smallest known ranges of all North American butterflies. Since their discovery, small populations of Uncompahgre fritillaries have been discovered at 9 other locations within this region and are monitored annually.

Their closest genetic relative is Boloria improba harryi which has only been found within the Wind River Mountains in Wyoming. Other similar looking species of butterflies are found within these habitats including the Varied checkerspot (Euphydryas anicia), Frieja fritillary (Clossiana frieja), and Arctic fritillary (Clossiana chariclea). The habitat characteristics of these butterflies include alpine tundra environments above tree-line (3800-4200m above sea level) that are northeast facing sloped meadows containing moderate amounts of moisture throughout the year, mostly from winter snowpack and rainfall during monsoon seasons.

=== Host plant ===
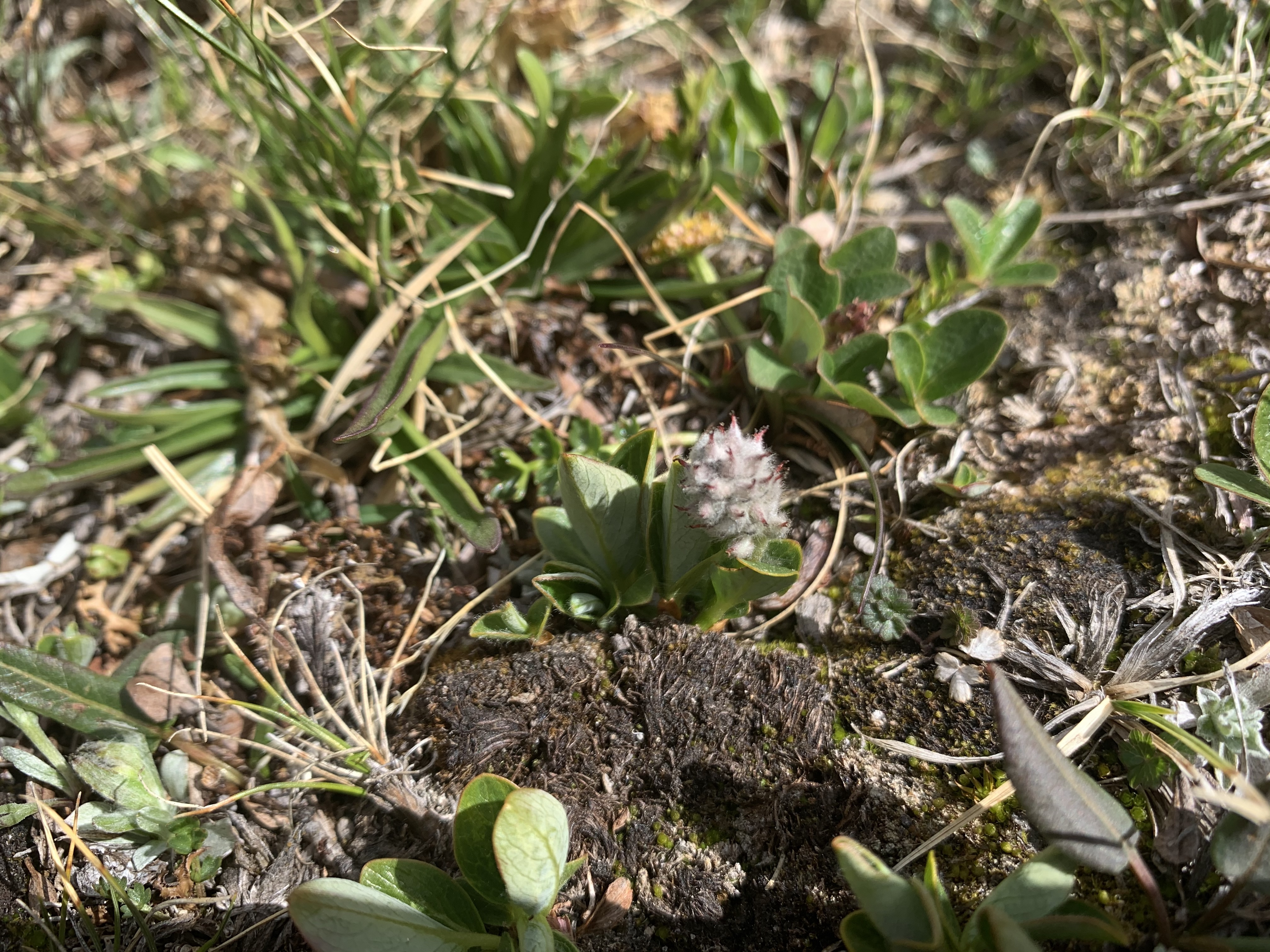
Snow willow (Salix nivalis) is the host plant of the Uncompahgre fritillary butterfly.

The Uncompahgre fritillary is a specialist species regarding their larval food plant and egg-laying site. They can be found in habitats containing patches of their host plant, snow willow (Salix reticulata spp. nivalis), a dwarf willow that is structurally similar to the Arctic willow (Salix arctica).

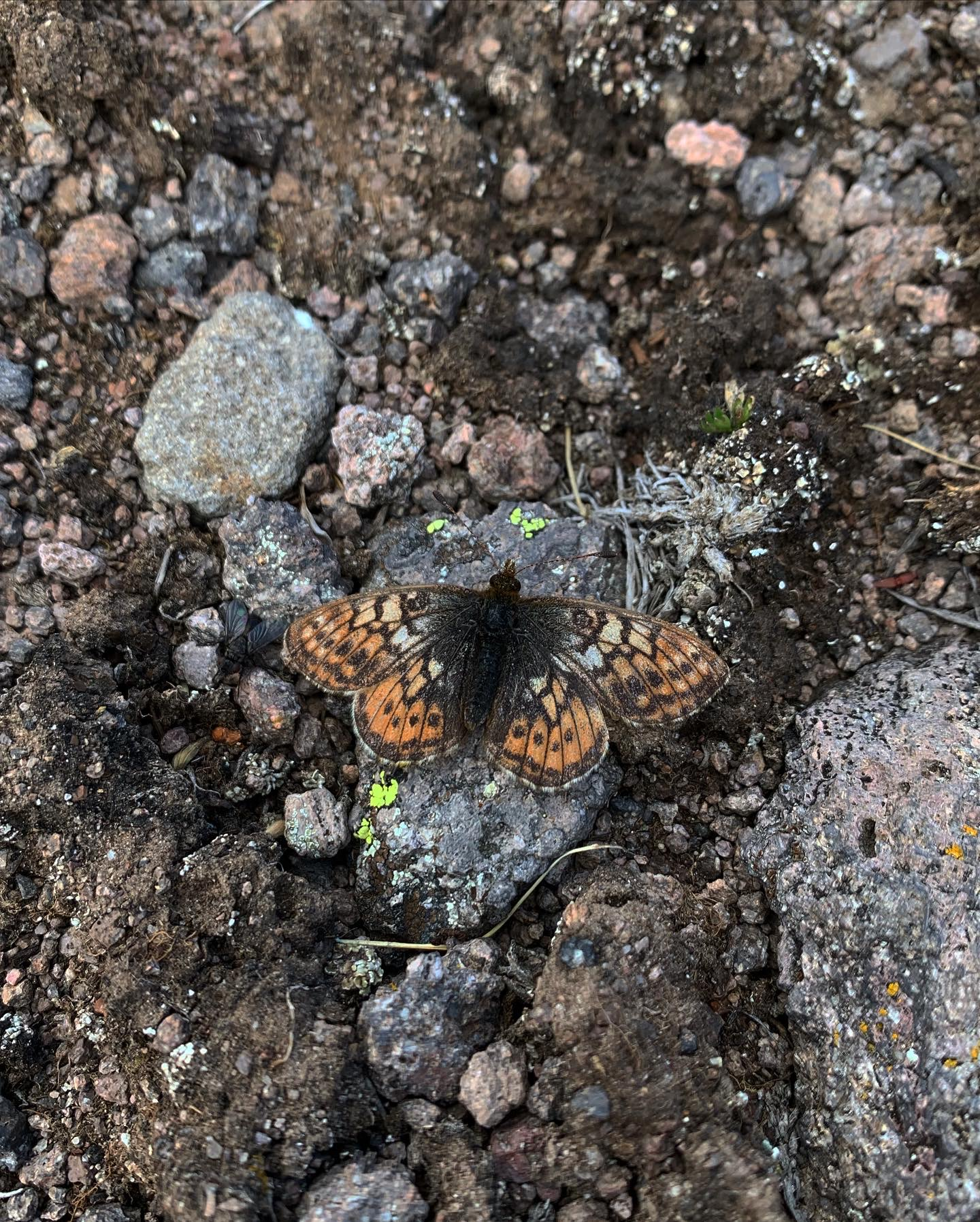
Adult Uncompahgre fritillary butterfly resting on a rock in the San Juan Mountains of Colorado.

== Life cycle ==
Female adult butterflies lay their eggs individually on snow willow stems and leaves around the middle of July and they don't hatch until numerous weeks later. The eggs are tan in color and once hatched, the larvae will then feed on snow willow leaves throughout their biennial life cycle and overwinter under the snow until they emerge the following spring and molt. The adult butterflies are small with a fuzzy, dark brown to black body and brown-black antennae. The males and females are differentiated by the females wings being slightly lighter in color than the males. Their wingspan is approximately 1 inch wide and their wings are multi-colored containing distinct patterns of tan, orange, brown, and black with a distinct triangular shape emerging on the dorsal and ventral wing. As adult butterflies, the Uncompahgre fritillaries are only in flight for a few weeks during the summer season, emerging following the snow melt at these high elevation mountain peak. They can be seen on wing starting in late-June to early-July and are considered weak fliers that require full sunlight with little to no wind in order to fly and are considered a philopatric species.

== Management ==
=== Population decline ===
Mark-recapture methods completed within a decade of their discovery showed low population estimates at Uncompahgre Peak and Redcloud Peak. The Uncompahgre fritillary was thought to be on the edge of extinction and was added to the Endangered Species List in 1991. Since then, early monitoring programs have found a number of additional populations in the San Juan Mountains but the small numbers detected at each of these locations remain inadequate for delisting. Predicted threats to this species and alpine tundra ecosystems include: grazing, illegal collection, recreation, and climate change, with an additional threat is the possibility of low genetic variability between the known butterfly populations.

The impacts of global climate change pose concerns to this species and alpine environments overall. Alpine environments are the coldest locations where pollinator species can still occur but the sensitive species of plants, insects, and animals found within these ecosystems might not have the ability to adapt to changes in temperatures and precipitation patterns.

=== Recovery efforts ===
The Uncompahgre fritillary butterfly is still listed as Federally Endangered by the U.S. Fish and Wildlife Service and the recovery plan prioritizes actions to better understand the reasons for their low population estimates and to prevent this species from extinction. Their public locations at Uncompahgre Peak and Redcloud Peak are monitored annually by the Bureau of Land Management, U.S. Forest Service, and Colorado Parks and Wildlife to estimate changes in population sizes, as well as to understand more about this species' habitat. Management efforts carried out by these agencies have restricted grazing livestock on these particular slopes, rerouted hiking trails, and installed signage regarding the status of this species at the trailheads of these popular hiking locations. The specialist habitat requirements and small distribution of the Uncompahgre fritillary butterfly make it a useful indicator of the future impacts of climate change could have on alpine ecosystem health and structure. Efforts to preserve this species continue to prevent illegal collection and monitor population numbers, habitat quality, and environmental pressures that future populations could encounter.

== See also ==
- List of butterflies of North America
