= Black Canyon Wilderness (Oregon) =

Wilderness area in the Ochoco National Forest, US

- IUCN category Ib (wilderness area)
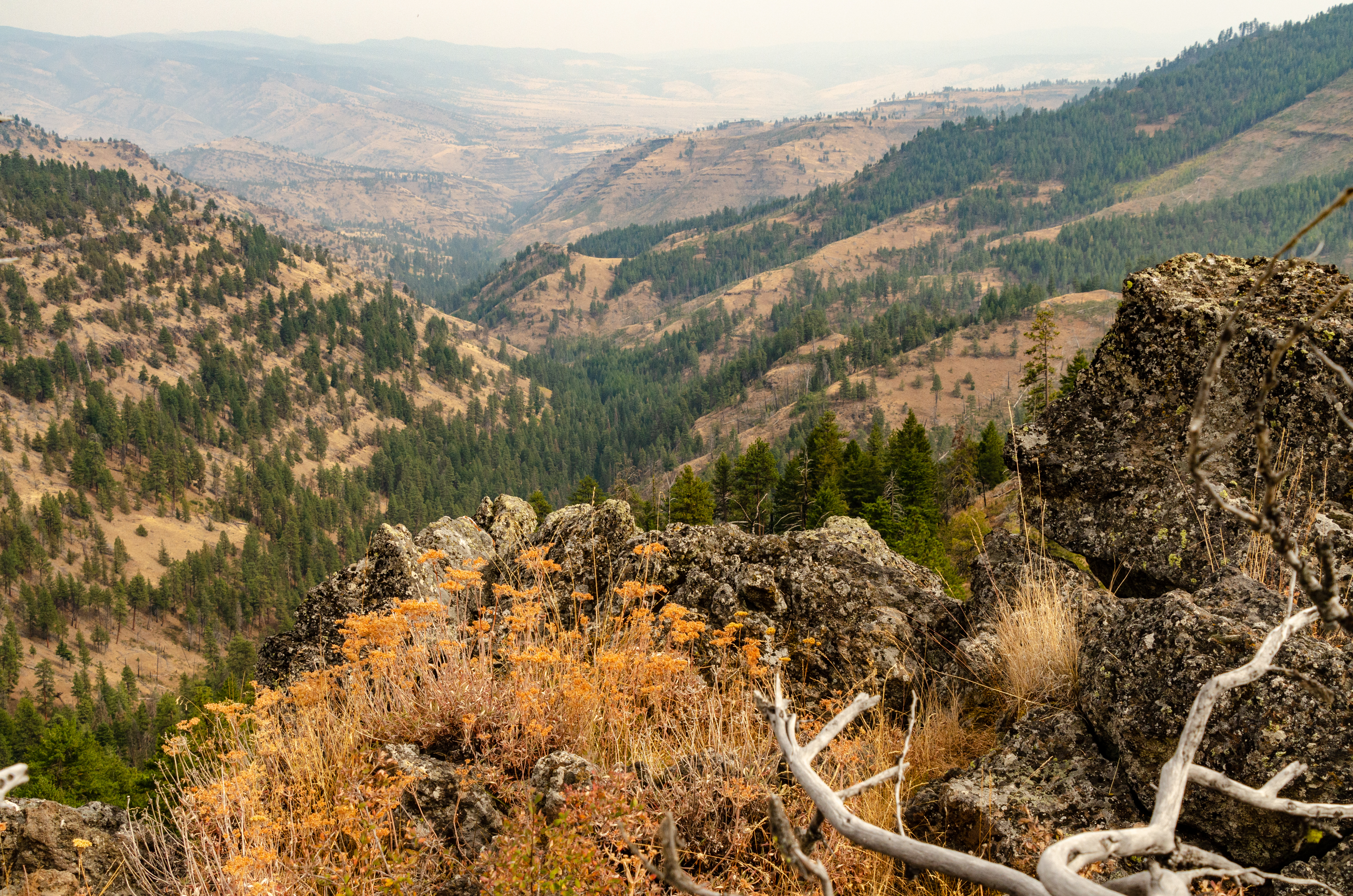
- View into the canyon near the Coffeepot Trailhead

- Location within Oregon
- Location: Grant / Wheeler counties, Oregon, United States
- Nearest city: Dayville, Oregon
- Coordinates: 44°20′13″N 119°39′15″W
- Area: 13,400 acres (5,423 ha)
- Established: 1984
- Governing body: United States Forest Service

The Black Canyon Wilderness of Oregon is a wilderness area in the Ochoco National Forest. It is within the drainage basin of the South Fork John Day River. It lies in Grant and Wheeler counties in Oregon. The nearest city is Paulina, in Crook County. It was established in 1984 and encompasses 13,400 acres (5,423 ha).

== Topography ==
The elevation ranges from 2,850 to 6,483 feet (869 to 1,976 m). There are about 17 miles (27 km) of developed trail; 80 percent of the wilderness has a grade exceeding 30 percent, typically steep canyons and sharp ridges. Three sides of the canyon reach elevations to 6,000 feet (1,829 m), while waters in the gorge have downcut through basalt lava, emptying into the South Fork John Day at 2,800 feet (853 m).

== Flora and fauna ==
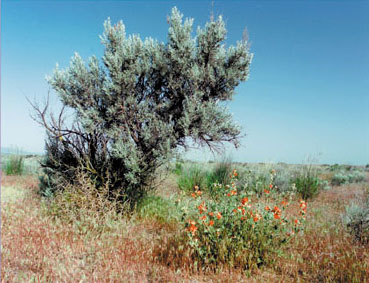
Sagebrush

Much of the Black Canyon Wilderness consists of a dry sagebrush environment, but ponderosa pine, mountain mahogany, juniper, and fir forests can also be explored.

A wide range of vegetative conditions in the wilderness provide habitat for nearly 300 different species of wildlife, including black bear, cougar, deer, elk, and rattlesnake. Steelhead trout can be found in perennial streams, which they use for spawning. Wildflowers such as crimson columbine, lupine, and Indian paintbrush flourish throughout the wilderness.

== See also ==
- List of Oregon Wildernesses
- List of U.S. Wilderness Areas
- Wilderness Act
