= Bridge Creek Wilderness =

Wilderness area in Oregon

- IUCN category Ib (wilderness area)
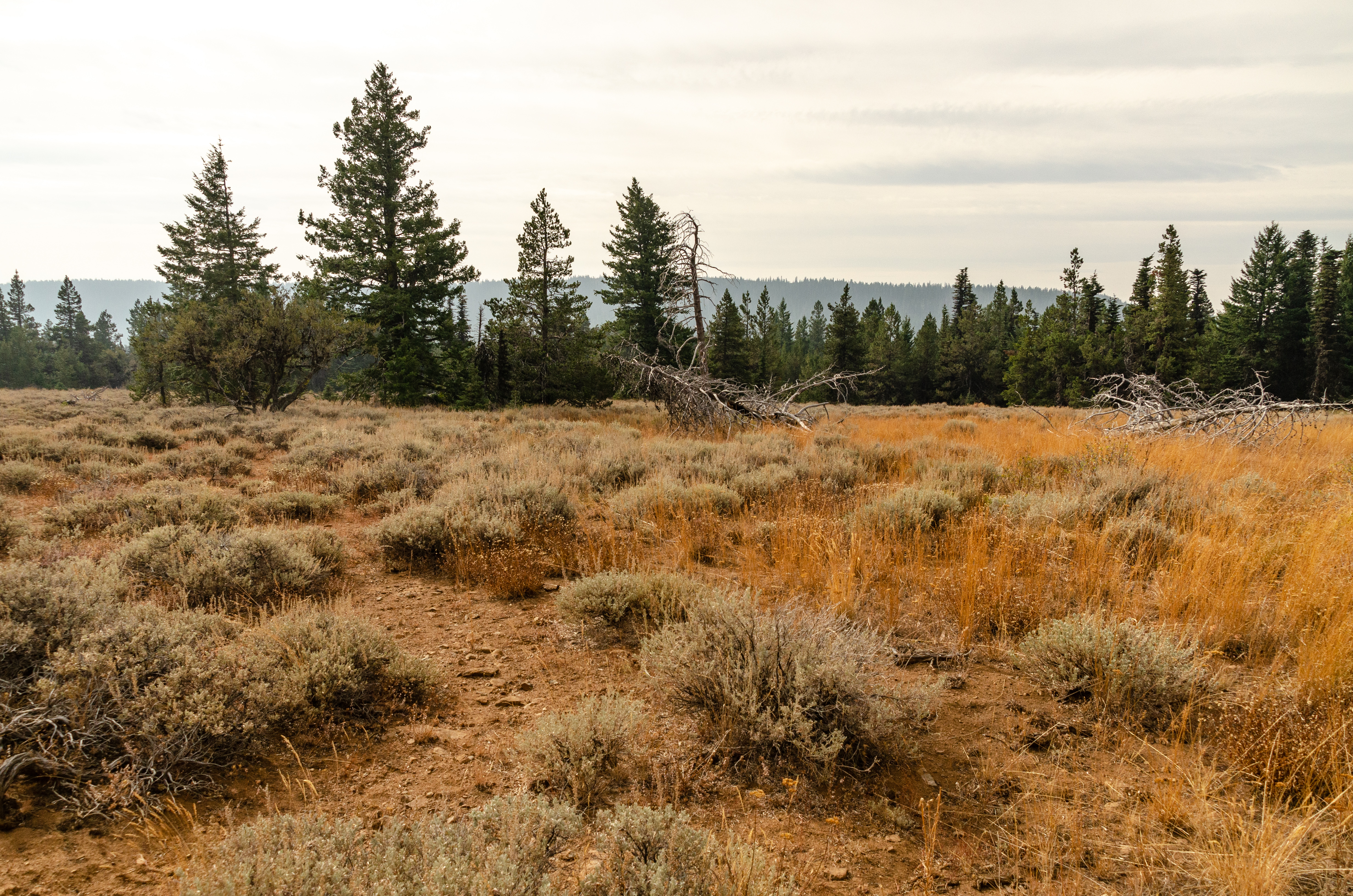
- Looking into the woods near North Point

- Location within Oregon
- Location: Wheeler County, Oregon, United States
- Nearest city: Prineville, Oregon
- Coordinates: 44°28′30″N 120°13′25″W
- Area: 5,400 acres (2,185 ha)
- Established: 1984
- Governing body: U.S. Forest Service

Bridge Creek Wilderness is a wilderness area located in the Ochoco Mountains of central Oregon, within the Ochoco National Forest. It was established in 1984 and comprises 5,400 acres (2,185 ha), making it one of the smallest wilderness areas in the state.

== Topography ==
Bridge Creek Wilderness is characterized by steep terrain, open meadows, forested mountain slopes, and barren plateaus. Elevation ranges from 4,360 to 6,607 feet (1,329 to 2,014 m). Bridge Creek drains northeasterly from the summit of the Ochoco Mountains, essentially dividing the Wilderness into two plateaus. The peaks of East Point and North Point at 6,625 feet (2,019 m) and 6,607 feet (2,014 m), respectively, look across the small Wilderness. Five perennial springs flow in the Wilderness - Thompson, Pisgah, Masterson, Nelson, and Maxwell. The Bridge Spring and Bridge Creek watershed creates the domestic water supply for the town of Mitchell.

Lava vents located north of the John Day River produced lava that now caps most of the Ochoco crest, creating the pillar-shaped basalt columns at the cliffs on North Point.

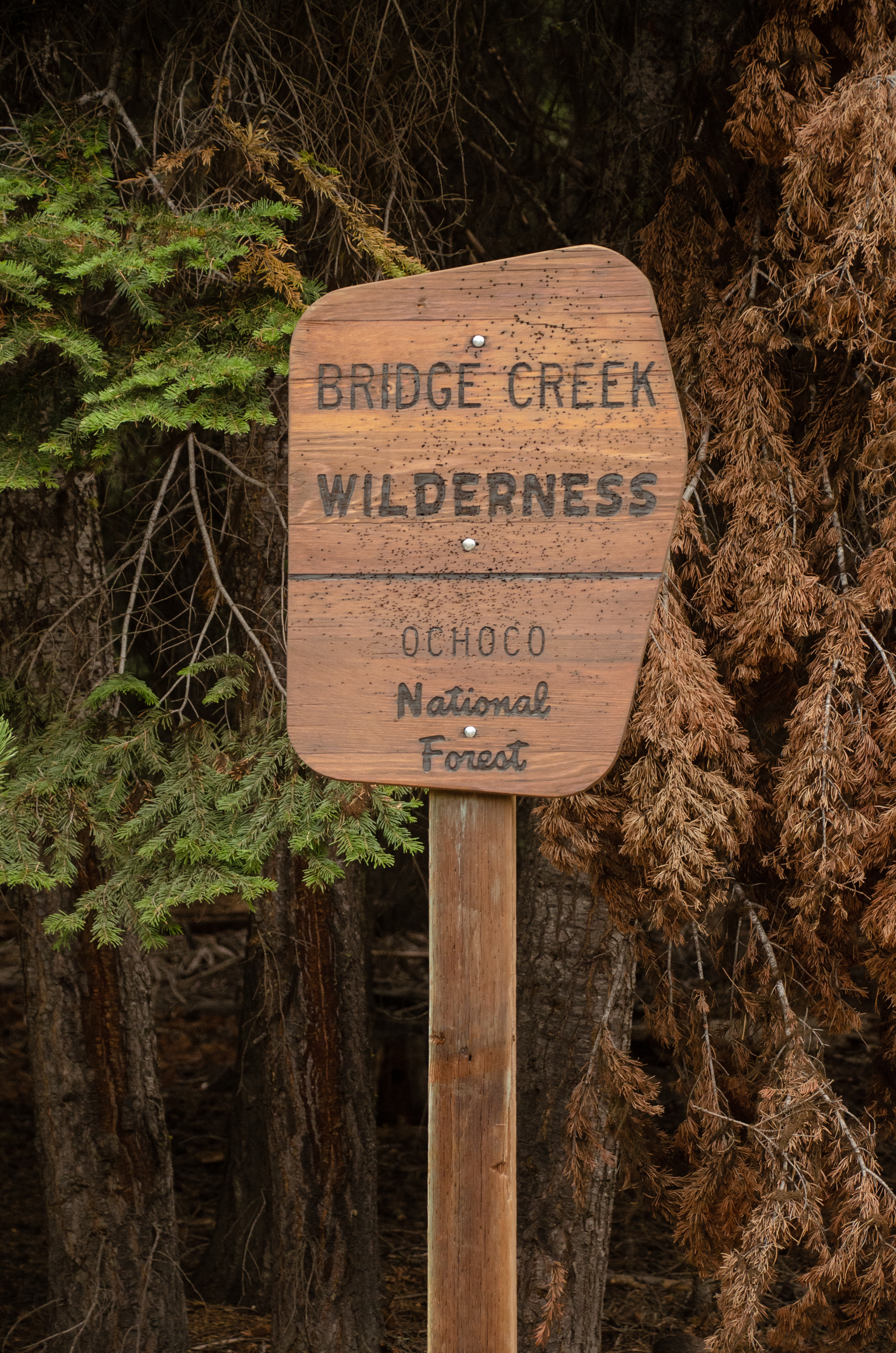
sign marking the wilderness boundary

== Vegetation ==
The forest in Bridge Creek Wilderness consists primarily of Douglas fir, grand fir, and larch, with some stands of lodgepole and ponderosa pine. Other plants include sagebrush, bunchgrass, sparse, and mountain mahogany.

== Wildlife ==
A variety of wildlife lives in Bridge Creek Wilderness, including elk, deer, mule deer, black bear, and mountain lion. Birds include pileated woodpecker, goshawk and prairie falcon.

== Recreation ==
Popular recreational activities in Bridge Creek Wilderness include hiking several miles of trails to North Point and East Point.

== See also ==
- List of Oregon Wildernesses
- List of U.S. Wilderness Areas
- Wilderness Act
