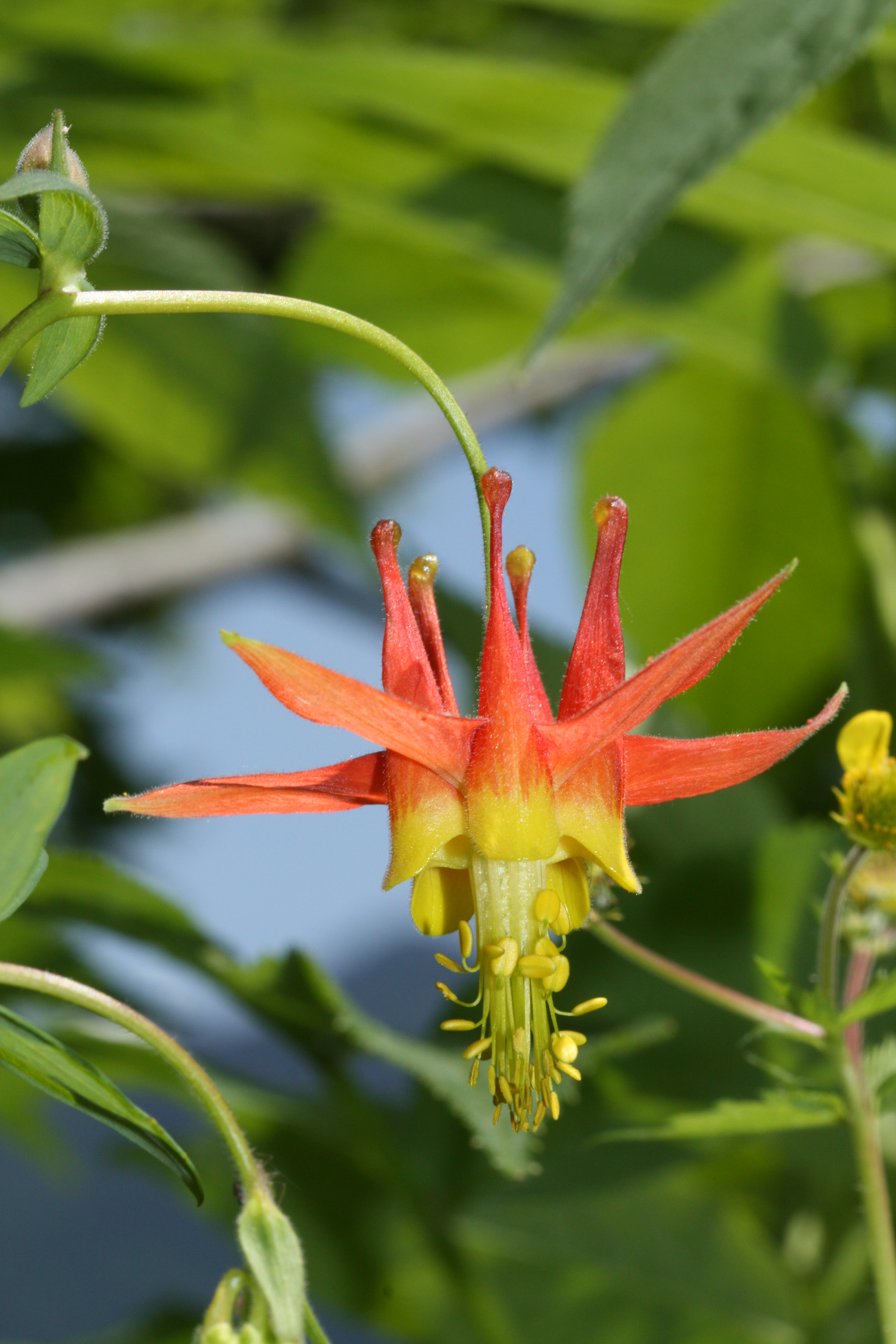

Conservation status
- Secure (NatureServe)

Scientific classification
- Kingdom: Plantae
- Clade: Tracheophytes
- Clade: Angiosperms
- Clade: Eudicots
- Order: Ranunculales
- Family: Ranunculaceae
- Genus: Aquilegia
- Species: A. formosa

Binomial name
- Aquilegia formosa Fisch. ex DC.

Varieties
- Aquilegia formosa var. formosa; Aquilegia formosa var. hypolasia (Greene) Munz; Aquilegia formosa var. truncata (Fisch. & C.A.Mey.) Baker

= Aquilegia formosa =

Western North American species of columbine

Aquilegia formosa, the crimson columbine, western columbine, sitka columbine, or (ambiguously) "red columbine", is a common wildflower native to western North America, from Alaska to Baja California, and eastward to Montana and Wyoming.

== Description ==
Aquilegia formosa is a perennial herb that grows to 20–80 cm (7.9–31.5 in) in height, averaging around 60 cm (24 in). Flowers, which can be seen from April to August (with some variation between regions), are about 5 cm (2.0 in) long and red and yellow in color. The sepals and petal spurs are typically a reddish-orange color, attributed to the anthocyanin pigments pelargonidin and cyanidin, and carotenoids. Petal blades are yellow, pigmented by carotenoids. The primary pollinators are hummingbirds, although bees, butterflies, and flies will also visit flowers. Despite several floral adaptations to hummingbird pollination, at ~9,000–10,000 feet (2,740–3,050 m) in elevation in the eastern drainages of the central Sierra Nevada mountains of California, A. formosa forms hybrid zones with Aquilegia pubescens, which is primarily pollinated by hawk moths.

The flowers are edible, with a sweet taste—though the seeds can be fatal if eaten, and most parts of the plant contain cyanogenic glycosides.

== Distribution ==
Within its range, the crimson columbine can be found in most kinds of habitat (chaparral, oak woodland, mixed-evergreen or coniferous forest). It is not found on desert floors, nor at altitudes above 3,300 metres (10,830 ft), and it is absent from the Central Valley of California. It prefers moist locations such as stream banks.

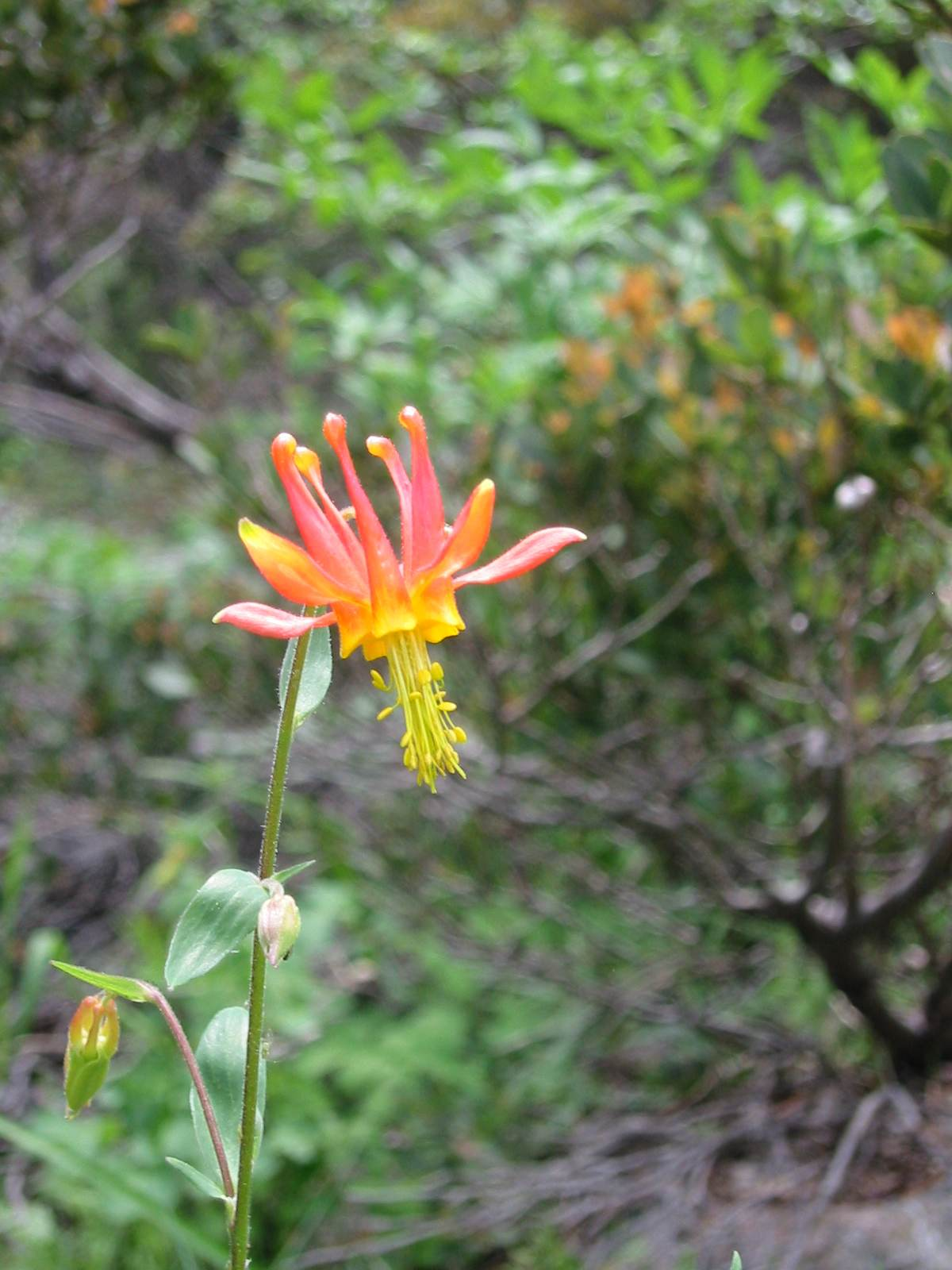
Crimson columbine (Aquilegia formosa truncata) taken at Castle Lake (California)

== Native American use ==
Some Plateau Indian tribes used the Aquilegia formosa to concoct a perfume. It is also used medicinally by several Native American tribes.

== Etymology ==
Aquilegia is derived from the Latin word 'aquila', meaning 'eagle', or possibly from the Medieval German words 'Acheleia' or 'Akelei'; this name is in reference to its talon-like nectaries. Formosa means 'handsome', 'beautiful', or 'well-formed'.
