= Ochoco National Forest =

National Forest in Oregon

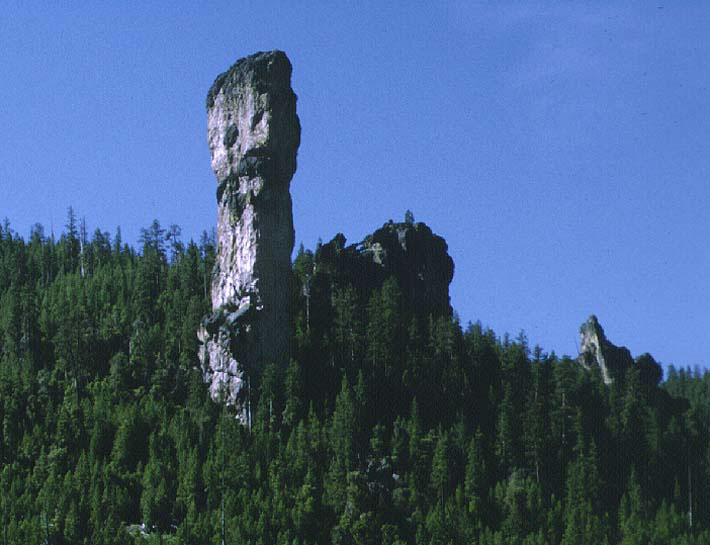
- Steins Pillar (Known as the "Big One" around the area)

- Location within the United States
- Location: Crook / Harney / Wheeler / Grant counties, Oregon, USA
- Nearest city: Mitchell, Oregon
- Coordinates: 44°22′35″N 120°07′00″W
- Area: 851,033 acres (3,444.01 km^{2})
- Established: July 1, 1911
- Visitors: 575,000 (in 2006)
- Governing body: U.S. Forest Service
- Website: Ochoco National Forest

The Ochoco National Forest is located in the Ochoco Mountains in Central Oregon in the United States, north and east of the city of Prineville, location of the national forest headquarters. It encompasses 850,000 acres (3,440 km^{2}) of rimrock, canyons, geologic oddities, dense pine forests, and high desert terrain, as well as the headwaters of the North Fork Crooked River. A 1993 Forest Service study estimated that the extent of old growth in the forest was 95,000 acres (38,000 ha).

In descending order of forestland area, it occupies lands within Crook, Harney, Wheeler, and Grant counties. The national forest also administers the Crooked River National Grassland, which is in Jefferson County.

== Wilderness ==
The forest contains three wilderness areas comprising 36,200 acres (146 km^{2}):

- Mill Creek Wilderness at 17,400 acres (70 km^{2})
- Bridge Creek Wilderness at 5,400 acres (22 km^{2})
- Black Canyon Wilderness at 13,400 acres (54 km^{2})

== Administration ==
The land is divided into three ranger districts:

- Lookout Mountain Ranger District
- Paulina Ranger District
- Crooked River Grasslands District

The Lookout Mountain and Paulina districts are located in Prineville while the Crooked River Grasslands are administered from office in Madras.

The former Snow Mountain Ranger District is now administered by the Malheur National Forest, as part of the Emigrant Creek Ranger District.

== Ecology ==
The Ochoco mountains are home to numerous species of interest to the Oregon Conservation Strategy under the Oregon Department of Fish and Wildlife including the Pacific Marten, Ferruginous Hawk, Greater Sage Grouse, Wolverine, and Piliated Woodpecker.

Due to sections of the forest representing winter range for mule deer and elk, sections of the forest prohibit the use of motorized vehicles from December through May.

== Recreation ==
Popular recreational activities in the Ochoco National Forest include hiking, fishing, camping, hunting, horseback riding, stargazing, birding, rock hounding, kayaking, and rock climbing.

== See also ==
- List of national forests of the United States
