= Summit High School (Bend, Oregon) =

Public high school in Bend, Oregon, United States

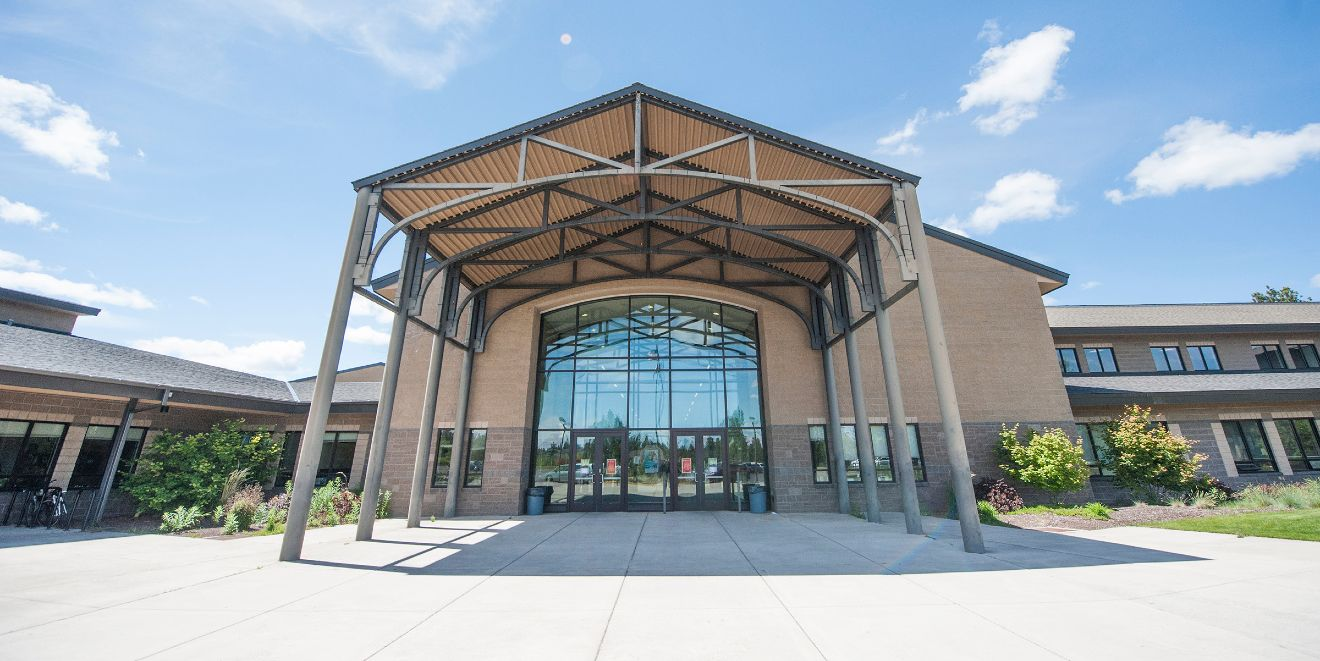

Location
- 2855 NW Clearwater Drive; Bend, (Deschutes County), Oregon 97703; United States; 44.057639°N 121.361284°W

Information
- Type: Public high school
- Opened: 2001
- School district: Bend-La Pine School District
- Principal: Donna Servignat
- Faculty: 49.02 (on an FTE basis)
- Grades: 9-12
- Enrollment: 1,282 (2024–2025)
- Student to teacher ratio: 26.15
- Colors: Green, black, and silver
- Athletics conference: OSAA Intermountain Conference, 5A-4
- Mascot: Storm Cat
- Team name: Storm
- Newspaper: The Pinnacle
- Website: summit.blschools.org

Summit High School is a public high school located in Bend, Oregon, United States.

In addition to sections of Bend, the school's boundary includes: Seventh Mountain and Tetherow.

== History ==
Summit High School was the third traditional high school built in Bend, with construction completed in 2001. It joined Mountain View High School, which opened in 1979, Bend High School, which opened in 1904, and Marshall High School, a magnet high school also located in Bend. Another high school, Caldera High School, was built in Bend in 2021.

== Demographics ==
As of the 2022–2024 school year, the school had an enrollment of 1,326 students and 51.72 classroom teachers (on an FTE basis), for a student–teacher ratio of 25.64:1.

In September 2007, the freshman class had about 320 students, a significant increase over the school's other classes, which had fewer than 300 each. The school hired more teachers to keep the numbers of students in each classroom below 30.

== Academics ==
In 2008, 86% of the school's seniors received a high school diploma. Of 319 students, 273 graduated, 39 dropped out, four received a modified diploma, and three remained in high school in 2009.

== Site ==
Summit High School is located on a 48-acre (190,000 m^{2}) site that includes 30 acres (120,000 m^{2}) of solid ground amid an area which had been mined for pumice since the 1940s (by 1998 the mining had stopped and the land was sold). Another 18 acres (73,000 m^{2}) over a former pumice mine were later bought for athletic fields. Rather than renovate the land so that it would remain stable, the school district decided to fix any problems as they arose. Construction was finished on the campus in 2001, with a total cost of $29.3 million. After a December 2005 storm, the athletic field became riddled with sinkholes, requiring expensive fixes before it was again usable. Additional storm damage occurred in classrooms, the gym, parking lots, and the theater. At the start of the 08-09 year, Summit had finished its new field and turf stadium due in large part to a grant provided by Drew Bledsoe, ex NFL Quarterback and former Offensive Coordinator for the Storm football team.

== Solar power ==
The school installed a 32-panel solar power system in November 2004 that was projected to provide 7,315 kilowatt-hours (kWh) of electricity. The project was funded through a grant from the Energy Trust of Oregon.

== Sports ==
When Summit High School opened its doors in 2001, it joined the Intermountain Conference as an Oregon School Activities Association 4A classification school. In 2006-07, the OSAA changed from a four-tier (1A-4A) classification system to a six-tier (1A-6A); as part of that reclassification, Summit High School remained in the Intermountain Conference but was then classified as 5A. It has remained a 5A school until the 2018-19 school year where it became part of the 6A classification. In 2022 it was reclassified as a 5A school. It is now a member of the Inter Mountain Conference (IMC), which includes Redmond, Ridgeview, Mountain View, Bend, and Caldera. Their neighbors and rival high schools, Mountain View, Bend, and Caldera High School are also part of the same conference and classification.

=== State titles ===
- Band: 2011, 2012, 2013, 2015, 2016, 2017, 2018
- Baseball: 2016, 2025
- Basketball (men): 2024
- Cross country running (men): 2011, 2012, 2013, 2014, 2015
- Cross country running (women): 2008, 2009, 2010, 2011, 2012, 2013, 2014, 2015, 2016, 2017, 2018, 2019, 2021, 2022, 2023, 2025
- Cross country skiing (men): 2005, 2006, 2007, 2008, 2009, 2010, 2011, 2012, 2013, 2014, 2016
- Football: 2015, 2022
- Golf (men): 2015, 2016, 2017, 2022, 2023, 2024
- Golf (women): 2006, 2007, 2009, 2010, 2011, 2012, 2013, 2014, 2015, 2016, 2023
- Soccer (men): 2013, 2021, 2023
- Soccer (women): 2010, 2012, 2013, 2014, 2015, 2016, 2017
- Speech & Debate: 2024
- Swimming (men): 2003, 2004, 2005, 2008, 2009, 2010, 2012, 2013, 2014, 2015, 2023
- Swimming (women): 2012, 2013, 2014, 2016
- Tennis (men): 2009, 2011, 2012, 2014, 2015, 2016, 2017, 2018, 2023
- Tennis (women): 2012
- Track and field (men): 2005, 2011, 2012, 2013, 2017, 2023, 2024
- Track and field (women): 2007, 2008, 2009, 2010, 2011, 2012, 2013, 2014, 2015, 2016, 2017, 2018, 2023, 2024
- Volleyball: 2011, 2015
- Water polo (men, non OSAA): 2014
- Water polo (women, non OSAA): 2015

=== Music ===
Summit High School has had a strong music department in its brief history. Under the direction of award-winning band director Dan Judd, the Summit High School Wind Ensemble performed at the Oregon State Band Championships for the first time in the school's history in 2007, receiving sixth place. The band has continued to perform at the championships every year since 2007, taking first place in the 5A division in 2011, 2012, 2013, 2015, 2016, 2017, and 2018. The band has also received numerous awards at national band festivals in locations including Los Angeles, San Francisco, New York City, and Seattle, and was selected from among hundreds of applicants to perform at Carnegie Hall in New York City in 2011. The Summit High School Symphony Orchestra, a collaboration between the school's band and orchestra programs, competed at the State Championships in 2010 and 2018. In the spring of 2014 the Chorale Choir was invited to perform at the State Championships, where it received eighth place. The Chorale, along with the Skyliner Jazz Ensemble, won the choral division of a national heritage festival held in Anaheim, California.

=== OSAA Cup ===
The OSAA Cup, previously the Oregonian Cup, was sponsored by Oregon's largest newspaper, The Oregonian until 2017. It is a yearly award that recognizes overall school excellence in academics, activities, athletics and sportsmanship. It seeks to recognize the top school in each OSAA classification based on its overall performance in each of those four key areas. Summit won the cup in 2008–2009, 2011–2012, 2013–2014, 2014 –2015, 2015–2016, 2016–2017, 2022–2023, and 2023–2024., 2024-2025 marking the schools 10th time receiving this award.

== Notable alumni ==
- Cam McCormick, American college football player who is on his ninth year of eligibility.
- Slater de Brun, First round draft pick of MLB Baltimore Orioles, 37th overall
- Hunter Hess, Olympic freestyle skier
