= Three Rivers South, Oregon =

Unincorporated community in the state of Oregon, United States

- Census-designated place
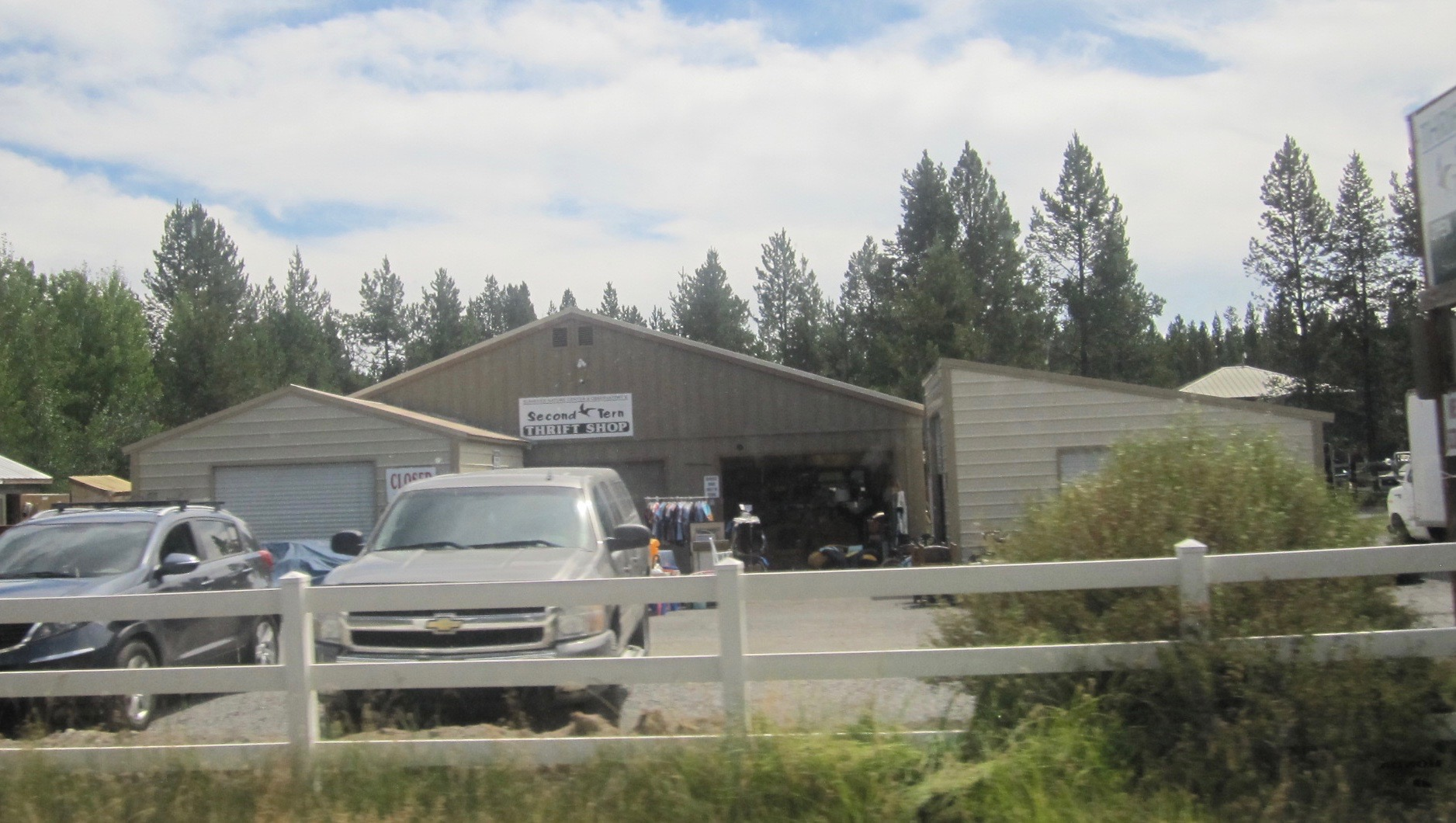
- Second Tern Thrift Shop in Three Rivers South

- Location of Three Rivers South, Oregon
- Coordinates: 43°49′12″N 121°28′09″W
- Country: United States
- State: Oregon
- County: Deschutes

Area
  - Total: 7.53 sq mi (19.50 km^{2})
  - Land: 7.53 sq mi (19.50 km^{2})
  - Water: 0 sq mi (0.00 km^{2})
- Elevation: 4,187 ft (1,276 m)

Population (2020)
  - Total: 3,925
  - Density: 521.3/sq mi (201.27/km^{2})
- Time zone: UTC-8 (Pacific (PST))
  - Summer (DST): UTC-7 (PDT)
- ZIP code: 97707
- Area codes: 458 and 541
- FIPS code: 41-73225
- GNIS feature ID: 1867481

Three Rivers South or Three Rivers is a census-designated place (CDP) and unincorporated community in Deschutes County, Oregon, United States. It is part of the Bend, Oregon Metropolitan Statistical Area. The population was 3,014 at the 2010 census.

== Geography ==
Three Rivers South is located in south-central Deschutes County, south of Sunriver and north of La Pine, just west of U.S. Route 97. The Deschutes and Little Deschutes rivers join in the CDP, with the Little Deschutes passing through the eastern part of the CDP and the Deschutes River passing through the west. The Spring River is a short spring-fed river in the northern part of the CDP that joins the Deschutes River from the west.

According to the United States Census Bureau, the CDP has a total area of 7.5 square miles (19.5 km^{2}), all counted as land.

== Demographics ==
Historical population
Census	Pop.	Note	%±
2020	3,925		—
U.S. Decennial Census

As of the census of 2000, there were 2,445 people, 991 households, and 709 families residing in the CDP. The population density was 257.6 inhabitants per square mile (99.5/km^{2}). There were 1,575 housing units at an average density of 165.9 per square mile (64.1/km^{2}). The racial makeup of the CDP was 94.81% White, 0.37% Black, 1.43% Native American, 0.29% Asian, 0.41% from other races, and 2.70% from two or more races. Hispanic or Latino of any race were 2.70% of the population.

There were 991 households, out of which 32.0% had children under the age of 18 living with them, 59.2% were married couples living together, 8.4% had a female householder with no husband present, and 28.4% were non-families. 20.1% of all households were made up of individuals, and 5.7% had someone living alone who was 65 years of age or older. The average household size was 2.47 and the average family size was 2.81.

In the CDP, the population was spread out, with 24.5% under the age of 18, 5.6% from 18 to 24, 31.5% from 25 to 44, 26.9% from 45 to 64, and 11.5% who were 65 years of age or older. The median age was 39 years. For every 100 females, there were 103.8 males. For every 100 females age 18 and over, there were 103.8 males.

The median income for a household in the CDP was $33,939, and the median income for a family was $36,464. Males had a median income of $30,585 versus $25,063 for females. The per capita income for the CDP was $19,410. About 14.1% of families and 16.8% of the population were below the poverty line, including 17.9% of those under age 18 and 19.5% of those age 65 or over.

== Education ==
It is in the Bend-La Pine School District. Zoned schools are:

- Three Rivers School
- Residents may choose between Caldera High School or La Pine High School.

Deschutes County is in the boundary of Central Oregon Community College.
