= Deschutes River Woods, Oregon =

Unincorporated community in the state of Oregon, United States

- Census-designated place
- Location of Deschutes River Woods, Oregon
- Coordinates: 43°59′33″N 121°21′27″W
- Country: United States
- State: Oregon
- County: Deschutes

Area
  - Total: 6.14 sq mi (15.89 km^{2})
  - Land: 6.07 sq mi (15.73 km^{2})
  - Water: 0.062 sq mi (0.16 km^{2})
- Elevation: 3,934 ft (1,199 m)

Population (2020)
  - Total: 5,532
  - Density: 911.0/sq mi (351.72/km^{2})
- Time zone: UTC-8 (Pacific (PST))
  - Summer (DST): UTC-7 (PDT)
- ZIP code: 97702
- Area codes: 458 and 541
- FIPS code: 41-19020
- GNIS feature ID: 2408662

Deschutes River Woods is a census-designated place (CDP) and unincorporated community in Deschutes County, Oregon, United States. It is part of the Bend, Oregon Metropolitan Statistical Area. As of the 2020 census, Deschutes River Woods had a population of 5,532.

== History ==
Deschutes River Woods was originally planned as a hunting and trapping resort, but emerged as a suburb in the 1960s when the land was divided up into 1-to-5-acre (0.40 to 2.02 ha) parcels and re-zoned for family dwellings; since that time the lots have been further sub-divided to 0.25 acres.

== Geography ==
The CDP is located in central Deschutes County, bordering the southwest edge of the city of Bend. The Deschutes River forms the northwestern edge of the CDP, with the community of Seventh Mountain on the opposite bank. The southern border of the CDP is with Newberry National Volcanic Monument, and U.S. Route 97 forms the eastern border.

According to the United States Census Bureau, Deschutes River Woods has a total area of 6.0 square miles (15.6 km^{2}), of which 5.9 square miles (15.4 km^{2}) is land and 0.1 square miles (0.2 km^{2}), or 1.03%, is water.

== Demographics ==
Historical population
| Census | Pop. | Note | %± |
|---|---|---|---|
| 1990 | 2,373 | | — |
| 2000 | 4,631 | | 95.2% |
| 2010 | 5,077 | | 9.6% |
| 2020 | 5,532 | | 9.0% |
U.S. Decennial Census

As of the census of 2020, there were 4,532 people, and 2,142 households residing in the CDP. The racial makeup of the CDP was 96.2% White, 0.3% African American, 1.2% Native American, 0.9% Asian, 0.0% Pacific Islander, 7.0% Hispanic or Latino and 1.4% from two or more races. As of the census of 2000, The population density was 952.6 inhabitants per square mile (367.8/km^{2}). There were 1,727 housing units at an average density of 355.2/sq mi (137.2/km^{2}).

There were 1,666 households, out of which 40.6% had children under the age of 18 living with them, 63.6% were married couples living together, 7.5% had a female householder with no husband present, and 23.9% were non-families. 17.0% of all households were made up of individuals, and 4.0% had someone living alone who was 65 years of age or older. The average household size was 2.78 and the average family size was 3.12.

In the CDP, the population was spread out, with 29.3% under the age of 18, 6.1% from 18 to 24, 35.1% from 25 to 44, 21.5% from 45 to 64, and 7.9% who were 65 years of age or older. The median age was 35 years. For every 100 females, there were 108.8 males. For every 100 females age 18 and over, there were 108.1 males.

The median income for a household in the CDP was $42,717, and the median income for a family was $45,046. Males had a median income of $34,053 versus $22,368 for females. The per capita income for the CDP was $16,934. About 6.6% of families and 8.8% of the population were below the poverty line, including 7.9% of those under age 18 and 2.1% of those age 65 or over.

== Education ==
It is in the Bend-La Pine School District. Zoned schools are:

- Elk Meadow Elementary School,
- Divided between Cascade Middle School and High Desert Middle School
- Caldera High School

Deschutes County is in the boundary of Central Oregon Community College.
