= Caldera High School =

School in Bend, Oregon, United States

Location
- 60925 SE 15th St; Bend, (Deschutes County), Oregon 97702; United States; 44.0110609°N 121.2853504°W

Information
- Opened: 2021
- School district: Bend-La Pine School District
- Principal: Chris Boyd
- Teaching staff: 7.67(FTE)
- Grades: 9–12
- Enrollment: 1,247 (2023–2024)
- Student to teacher ratio: 162.58
- Colors: Navy, Orange, and Gray
- Athletics conference: OSAA 5A-4 Intermountain Conference
- Mascot: Wolf
- Team name: Wolfpack
- Rival: Bend Senior High School
- Website: Caldera High School Homepage

Caldera High School (CHS) is a public high school located in Bend, Oregon. Caldera is the newest school opened in the Bend-La Pine School District.

In addition to sections of Bend, the high school's attendance boundary includes Deschutes River Woods. The school district states that residents of these locations are in a choice zone where a student may attend either Caldera High or La Pine High School: Sunriver and Three Rivers.

== History ==
In November 2017, a $268.3 million bond was passed to relieve overcrowding and improve Bend-La Pine high schools. Construction started in mid-2019 and finished in 2021. The school opened only to freshmen and sophomores for the 2021–2022 school year.

=== Naming of the high school ===
Bend-La Pine advisory committee proposed the high school be named "Robert D. Maxwell High School." Maxwell was a former teacher and the nation's oldest living Medal of Honor recipient, who died in 2019. However, it was decided that the school be named "Caldera High School" in reference to the Newberry National Volcanic Monument and the geologic past and present of Central Oregon.

== Athletics ==
Caldera High School competes in the OSAA 5A-4 Intermountain Conference.

Caldera High School Track and Field won both the Men’s and Women’s state titles in the spring of 2025.
