= Tetherow, Oregon =

Unincorporated community in the state of Oregon, United States

- Census-designated place
- Location in the state of Oregon Tetherow (the United States)
- Coordinates: 44°02′29″N 121°22′20″W
- Country: United States
- State: Oregon
- County: Deschutes

Area
  - Total: 2.14 sq mi (5.53 km^{2})
  - Land: 2.14 sq mi (5.53 km^{2})
  - Water: 0 sq mi (0.00 km^{2})
- Elevation: 3,806 ft (1,160 m)

Population (2020)
  - Total: 811
  - Density: 380.2/sq mi (146.78/km^{2})
- Time zone: UTC-8 (Pacific (PST))
  - Summer (DST): UTC-7 (PDT)
- FIPS code: 41-72820
- GNIS feature ID: 2584427

Tetherow is a census-designated place (CDP) in Deschutes County, Oregon, United States. It is part of the Bend, Oregon Metropolitan Statistical Area. As of the 2020 census, Tetherow had a population of 811.

== Geography ==
Tetherow is located in central Deschutes County along the western edge of the city of Bend, the county seat and largest city in the county. According to the United States Census Bureau, the CDP has a total area of 2.11 square miles (5.46 km^{2}), all land.

== Demographics ==
Historical population
Census	Pop.	Note	%±
2020	811		—
U.S. Decennial Census

== Education ==
It is in the Bend-La Pine School District. Zoned schools are:

- W. E. Miller Elementary School
- Divided between Cascade Middle School and Pacific Crest Middle School
- Summit High School

Deschutes County is in the boundary of Central Oregon Community College.
