= Mountain View High School (Bend, Oregon) =

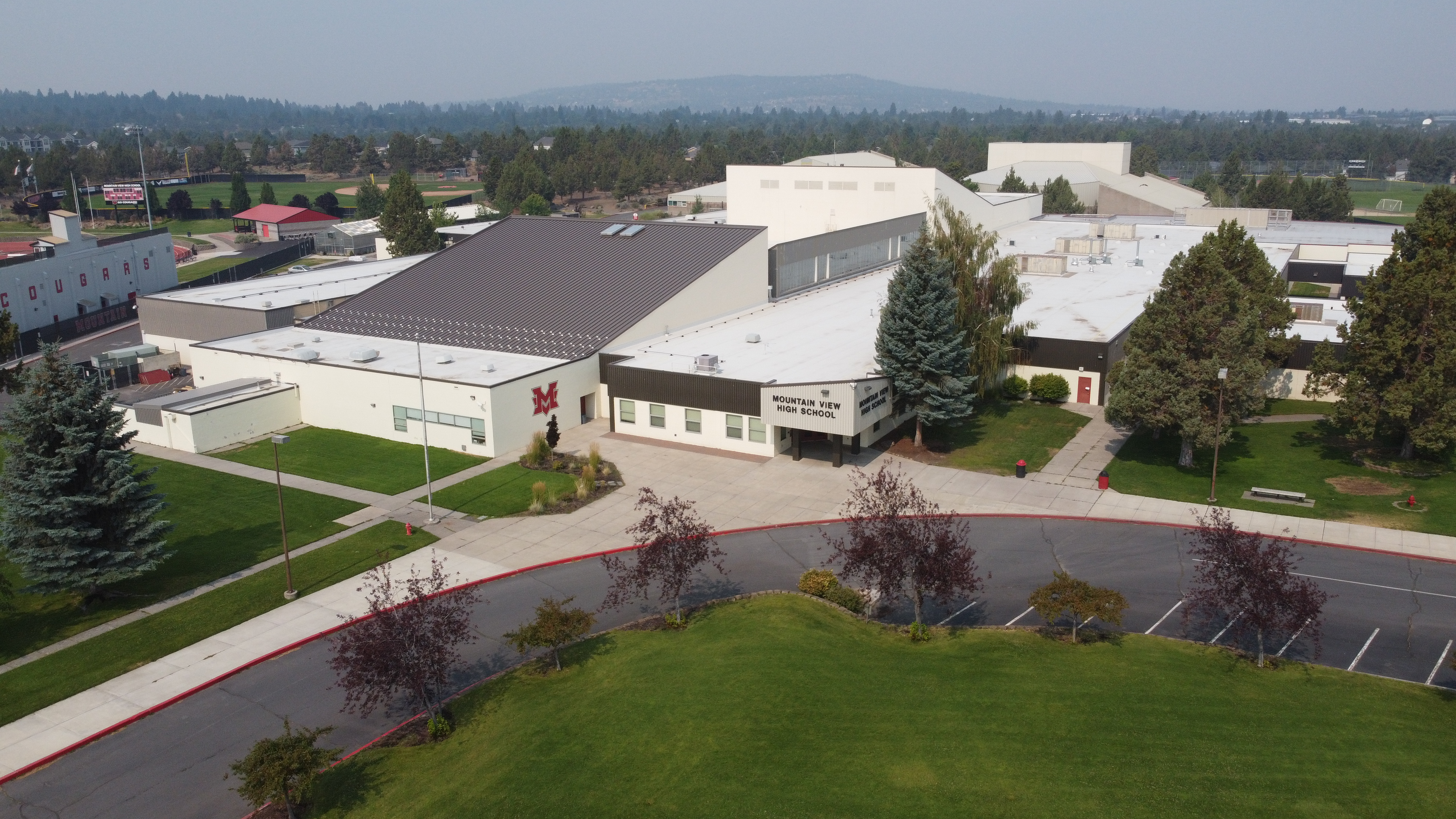
- Mountain View High School in July 2024.

Location
- 2755 NE 27th Street; Bend, Oregon 97701; United States; 44.077°N 121.265°W

Information
- Type: Public
- Opened: 1979; 47 years ago
- School district: Bend-La Pine
- Principal: Michael Hicks
- Teaching staff: 55.06 (FTE)
- Grades: 9–12
- Enrollment: 1,261 (2023-2024)
- Student to teacher ratio: 22.90
- Colors: Red, Black, & White
- Athletics conference: OSAA 5A-4; Intermountain Conference
- Mascot: Cougar
- Rivals: Bend Senior High School
- Newspaper: n/a
- Yearbook: The Pinnacle
- Website: mountainview.blschools.org

Location in the United States
Location in Oregon

Mountain View High School (MVHS) is a public high school in the northwest United States, located in Bend, Oregon.

== History ==
Mountain View High School opened 47 years ago in 1979 as the second high school in the greater Bend area. It was the first new high school in the area since Bend High School had opened in 1904, and the two schools remained the only traditional high schools in Bend until Summit High School opened in 2001 (Marshall High School is a magnet high school also located in Bend). The school's first principal was Jack Harris; after his retirement in 1987, the school named the football stadium after him.

In 1989, the students had the ability to leave campus during lunch (open campus), but at the time the school district administration was considering ending this. Scott Mutchie, the superintendent, was saying that the presence of illegal drugs in the community was a factor to end open campus. Some students, in a school meeting, expressed disagreement with the reasoning.

The school's mascot is a Cougar; MVHS originally adopted University of Notre Dame's fight song, but it is now based on that of Washington State University, whose mascot is also the cougar.

== Academics ==
In 2008, the graduation rate was 80%.

== Athletics ==
=== State titles ===
- Cross country: 1995 (boys), 2000 (girls)
- Football: 2011
- Nordic skiing: 2008, 2009, 2010
- Alpine skiing: 1983, 1985, 1986, 1989, 1990, 1992, 1998
- Soccer: 1999 (boys)
- Swimming: 1992 (girls), 1995 (girls), 2001 (girls), 2001 (boys)
- Water polo: 2013, 2015, 2016

== Notable alumni ==
- Linsey Corbin – professional triathlete
- Ashton Eaton – University of Oregon decathlete, 2016 Olympic Champion, 2012 Olympic champion
- Cody Hollister – NFL wide receiver for the Tennessee Titans
- Jacob Hollister – NFL tight end for the Buffalo Bills
- Ethan Blair Miller – perpetrator of the 2022 Bend, Oregon shooting
- Jourdan Miller – 20th winner of America's Next Top Model
- Ben Ferguson – professional snowboarder
- Lydia Jett - venture capitalist
