= Shevlin, Oregon =

Unincorporated community in the state of Oregon, United States

- Former unincorporated community
- Location within Oregon Location within the United States
- Coordinates: 43°08′19″N 121°40′39″W
- Country: United States
- State: Oregon
- Counties: Deschutes, Klamath
- Elevation: 5,000 ft (1,500 m)
- Time zone: UTC-8 (Pacific (PST))
  - Summer (DST): UTC-7 (PDT)
- GNIS feature ID: 1158628
- Coordinates and elevation from Geographic Names Information System

Shevlin was an unincorporated community in Deschutes and Klamath counties in the U.S. state of Oregon. It consisted of a collection of logging camp buildings that were moved from place to place on rail cars as logging progressed. The loggers worked for the Shevlin–Hixon Company.

== History ==
Some of its known locations from north to south included a spot about 10 miles (16 km) south of Lava Butte and about 3 miles (5 km) east of U.S. Route 97 and a second place about 3 miles (5 km) southeast of La Pine, both in Deschutes County. The community then moved to Summit Stage Station on Oregon Route 31 in northeastern Klamath County near its border with Lake County. The Geographic Names Information System places the community in the Fremont–Winema National Forest southeast of Chemult.

Shevlin post office opened in 1931 with William J. Baer as the first postmaster. By 1936, the post office had moved to Klamath County, where it continued until 1951. After that, mail to Shevlin went to the post office in Chemult.
