= Cloverdale, Oregon (disambiguation) =

Cloverdale, Oregon may refer to:

- Cloverdale, Oregon (census-designated place in Tillamook County)
- Cloverdale, Deschutes County, Oregon (unincorporated community)
- Cloverdale, Lane County, Oregon (unincorporated community)
