= La Pine Senior High School =

Public school in La Pine, Oregon, United States

Location
- 51633 Coach Road; La Pine, (Deschutes County), Oregon 97739; United States; 43.675801°N 121.506091°W

Information
- Type: Public
- Opened: 1979
- School district: Bend-La Pine School District
- Principal: Matt Montgomery
- Staff: 25.25 (FTE)
- Grades: 9-12
- Enrollment: 440 (2024-2025)
- Student to teacher ratio: 17.43
- Colors: Blue and gold
- Athletics conference: OSAA 3A-5
- Mascot: Hawk
- Website: La Pine SHS website

La Pine Senior High School, called La Pine High School (LPHS), is a public high school in La Pine, Oregon, United States.

The school district states that residents of these locations are in a choice zone where a student may attend either La Pine High or Caldera High School: Sunriver and Three Rivers.

== Academics ==
In 2008, 70% of the school's seniors received a high school diploma. Of 124 students, 87 graduated, 26 dropped out, and 11 were still in high school in 2009.

== Athletics ==
In 2015, the La Pine wrestling team took the league championships, were the 3A special district 3 dual championships, took second in state as a team, had 14 state placers two state champions tommy gallamore and Derrick Kerr

In 2018, the La Pine Hawks baseball team won the 3A state championship. Coach Bo DeForest led the team to the 4 seed where the Hawks played Horizon Christian in the championship game, winning 10-5. Catcher and Pitcher Wyatt DeForest was honored with the Moda Health Player of the Game

In 2019, the La Pine hawks won their second 3A state championship in a row for baseball. After gaining the 4 seed Coach Bo DeForest led the Hawks to a 8-1 win over Warrenton. Pitcher Adam Plant won the Moda Health Player of the Game.
