= Robert D. Maxwell =

US Army Medal of Honor recipient (1920–2019)

Robert Dale Maxwell
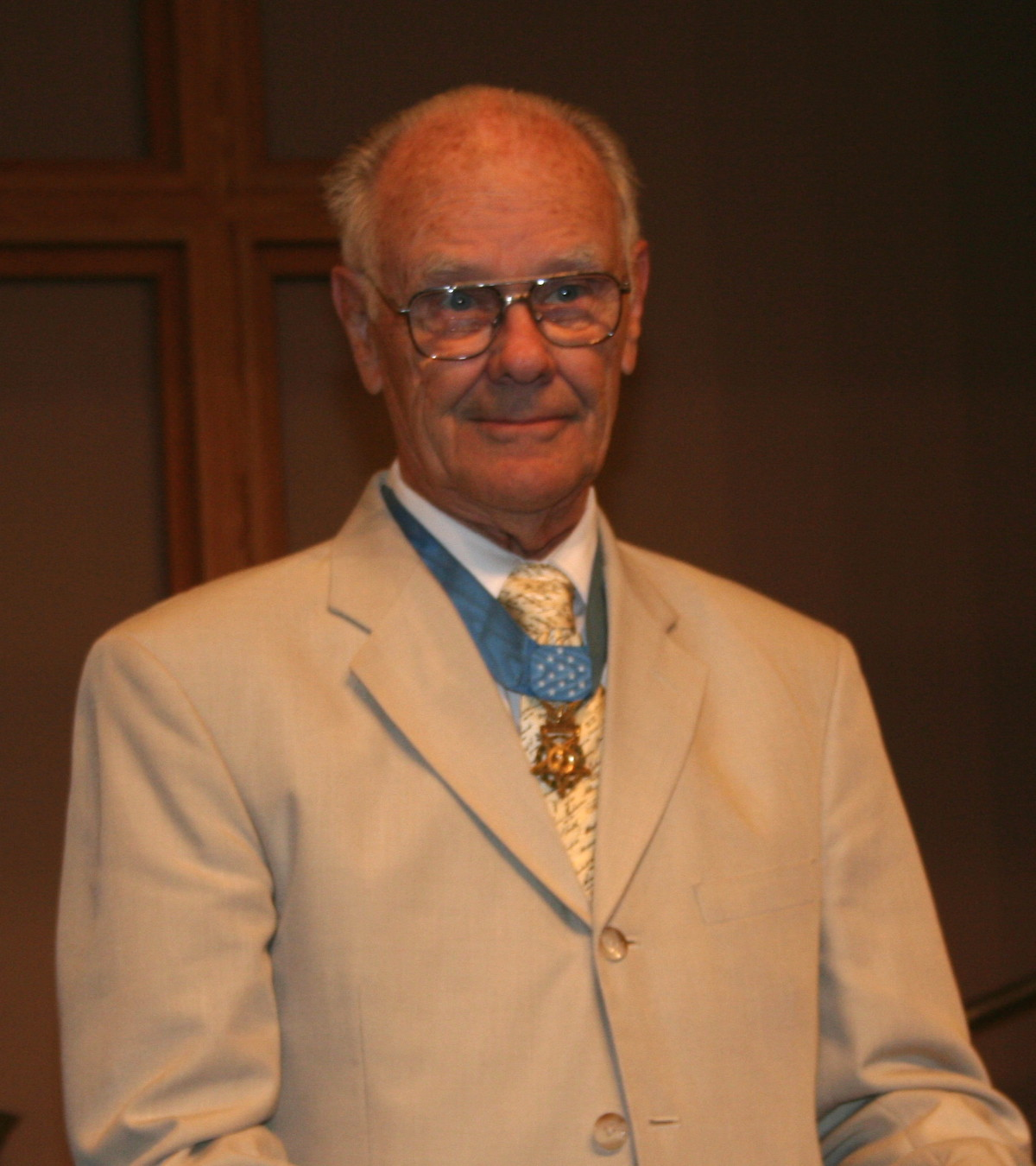
- Maxwell in 2006
- Born: October 26, 1920; Boise, Idaho, United States
- Died: May 11, 2019 (aged 98); Bend, Oregon, United States
- Burial place: Terrebonne Pioneer Cemetery, Terrebonne, Oregon
- Military career
- Allegiance: United States
- Branch: United States Army
- Service years: 1941–1945
- Rank: Technician Fifth Grade
- Units: Headquarters Company, 3rd Battalion, 7th Infantry Regiment, 3rd Infantry Division
- Conflicts: World War II: North African campaign; Italian campaign; Allied invasion of Sicily; Allied invasion of Italy; Battle of Anzio; Operation Dragoon
- Awards: Medal of Honor; Silver Star (2); Bronze Star Medal; Purple Heart (2)

Robert Dale Maxwell (October 26, 1920 – May 11, 2019) was a United States Army combat soldier and a recipient of the United States military's highest decoration for valor—the Medal of Honor—for his heroism in France during World War II.

== Early life ==
Maxwell was born on October 26, 1920, in Boise, Idaho. He was raised by his grandparents on their farm in Quinter, Kansas. He dropped out of school in the seventh grade to help his family on their farm. During the Great Depression, his family traveled to Oregon to pick fruit, but ran out of money on the way back to Kansas so they settled in Colorado.

== Military service ==
Maxwell was drafted into the United States Army and entered service from Larimer County, Colorado, in June 1941. He was offered and refused "conscientious objector" status by the army for being a Quaker. He received basic training at Camp Roberts, California and training in advanced infantry tactics at Camp Meade in Maryland.

In February 1942, Maxwell was sent overseas and landed in North Africa at Casablanca with the 3rd Battalion, 7th Infantry Regiment, 3rd Infantry Division. He was assigned to Headquarters Company as a battalion communications technician, a "wire man." He carried a heavy roll of cable and was tasked with stringing phone lines to the command post. He began the war armed with a M1 Garand rifle, but was later reclassified as a non-combatant and carried only a .45 caliber pistol.

After participating in the North African Campaign with his unit, Maxwell took part in the Allied invasion of Sicily on July 10, 1943, marching to Palermo, and on to Messina. The 7th Infantry then landed at Salerno in September shortly after the Allied invasion of mainland Italy and fought northwards to an area near Cassino. During the early stages of the subsequent Battle of Anzio in January 1944, Private First Class Maxwell repaired damaged wire lines to maintain communication under intense artillery fire for over three hours on January 31 and was wounded in the leg. For his actions under fire that day, he was awarded the Silver Star. He spent the next few months recovering at a hospital in Naples.

Maxwell rejoined his unit in time for the invasion of southern France (Operation Dragoon) in August 1944 and the following advance inland. On September 7, near Besançon in eastern France, Technician Fifth Grade (Corporal) Maxwell, while under enemy fire, risked his life in order to protect the lives of other soldiers by falling on an enemy hand grenade and absorbing the blast with his body. He survived the wounds from the grenade blast and was awarded the Medal of Honor on April 6, 1945. The medal was presented to him by Major General Clarence Danielson at the Camp Carson Convalescent Hospital in Colorado on May 12. He also received an oak leaf cluster to his Silver Star, which was awarded for an earlier action on September 7, 1944.

== Post-war ==
After the war, Maxwell enrolled in vocational school for two years in Eugene, Oregon to be an auto mechanic. After his training, he worked a two-year apprenticeship for an Oldsmobile car dealership in Redmond, Oregon. During this time, he met Beatrice, and they married on August 12, 1951.

He then taught auto mechanics at Bend High School in Bend, Oregon and later helped establish an auto mechanics program at Central Oregon Community College. From 1966 through 1986, Maxwell taught auto mechanics at Lane Community College in Eugene. He was honored in 1970 as one of 5,000 outstanding educators.

In 2011, at the age of 90, he received his high school diploma from Bend Senior High School. In 2012, Maxwell suffered a minor stroke, but recovered after only a few days with only minor loss of functionality of his right hand. He continued as the director of the non-profit Bend Heroes Foundation.

After retiring, Maxwell resided in Bend, Oregon until his death. He died in Bend on May 11, 2019, at the age of 98. At the time of his death, he was the only Medal of Honor recipient residing in Oregon. Maxwell's memorial service was held on May 31, 2019. So, many people were expected to attend that the service was held at the Deschutes County fairgrounds in Redmond, a few miles north of Bend. A local television station broadcast the memorial service live for those who could not attend the memorial service in person. Maxwell was buried in Pioneer Cemetery in Terrebonne, Oregon.

== Medal of Honor citation ==
Medal of Honor (United States Army)

Maxwell's official Medal of Honor citation reads:

Rank and organization: Technician Fifth Grade, U.S. Army, 7th Infantry, 3d Infantry Division
Place and date: Near Besançon, France, 7 September 1944
Entered service at: Larimer County, Colo.
G.O. No. 24, 6 April 1945

For conspicuous gallantry and intrepidity at risk of life above and beyond the call of duty on 7 September 1944, near Besancon, France. Technician 5th Grade Maxwell and 3 other soldiers, armed only with .45 caliber automatic pistols, defended the battalion observation post against an overwhelming onslaught by enemy infantrymen in approximately platoon strength, supported by 20mm. flak and machinegun fire, who had infiltrated through the battalion's forward companies and were attacking the observation post with machinegun, machine pistol, and grenade fire at ranges as close as 10 yards. Despite a hail of fire from automatic weapons and grenade launchers, Technician 5th Grade Maxwell aggressively fought off advancing enemy elements and, by his calmness, tenacity, and fortitude, inspired his fellows to continue the unequal struggle. When an enemy hand grenade was thrown in the midst of his squad, Technician 5th Grade Maxwell unhesitatingly hurled himself squarely upon it, using his blanket and his unprotected body to absorb the full force of the explosion. This act of instantaneous heroism permanently maimed Technician 5th Grade Maxwell, but saved the lives of his comrades in arms and facilitated maintenance of vital military communications during the temporary withdrawal of the battalion's forward headquarters.

== Awards and decorations ==
Maxwell's military awards and decorations include:

Badge	Combat Infantryman Badge		
1st row	Medal of Honor	Silver Star with 1 Oak leaf cluster	Bronze Star Medal
2nd row	Purple Heart with 1 Oak leaf cluster	Army Good Conduct Medal	American Defense Service Medal
3rd row	American Campaign Medal	European–African–Middle Eastern Campaign Medal with 7 Campaign stars	World War II Victory Medal

French Legion of Honor (Chevalier-Knight) (France)	Croix de Guerre (France)

== Namings and honors ==
- In 1984, a modern bridge was built on the Deschutes River upstream from the narrow wooden General Patch Bridge, which was built during World War II in Bend, Oregon. On 11 September 2004, the modern bridge was named the Robert D. Maxwell Veterans Memorial Bridge to honor Maxwell. Patch who commanded the U.S. Seventh Army during World War II, had recommended Maxwell for the Medal of Honor.
- In 2012, Lane Community College in Eugene, Oregon, named its student veterans center after Maxwell.
- In November 2013, Maxwell's photo was one of 12 photos of service uniformed Medal of Honor recipients on the cover sheet of a U.S. Postal Service "World War II Medal of Honor Forever Stamp" packet of 20 Medal of Honor stamps. His photograph is the last one located on the sheet.
- In May 2025, Central Oregon Community College dedicated its new veterans center as the Robert D. Maxwell Veterans Resource Center.

== See also ==
- List of Medal of Honor recipients for World War II
