= Lava bear =

Variety of bear in North America

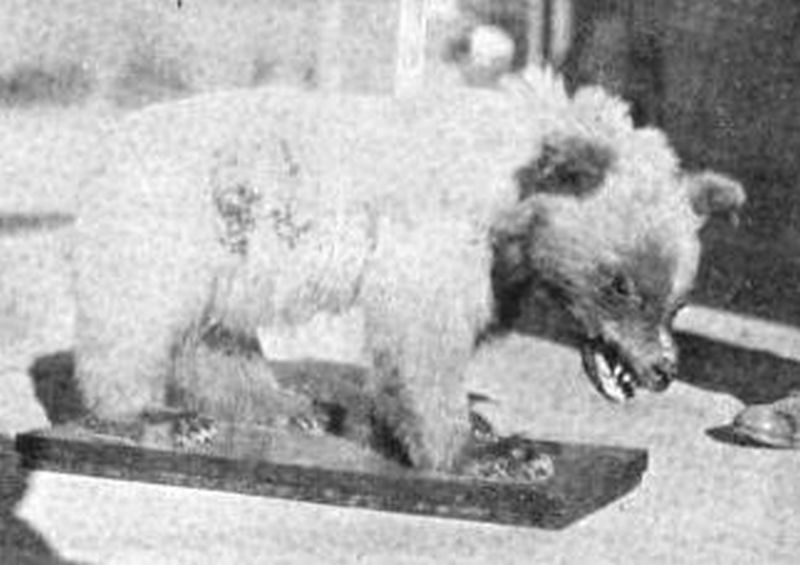
- Lava bear specimen exhibited in 1917

Creature information
- Other name(s): Sand lapper and dwarf grizzly
- Grouping: Undersized variation of known species (Ursus americanus)
- Similar entities: American black bear

Origin
- First attested: 1917
- Country: United States
- Region: South central Oregon
- Details: Found in high desert lava beds

The lava bear (also known as sand lapper, dwarf grizzly, and North American sun bear) is a variety of American black bear (Ursus americanus) found in the lava beds of south central Oregon. The animal was described as a very small bear with wooly light brown fur. The few lava bears that were killed or captured were a little larger than a badger. It was once thought to be a separate species. However, scientists who examined the specimens determined that the animals were stunted due to the harsh environment in which they lived. Today, it is acknowledged that lava bears never existed as a unique species.

== Description ==
When lava bears were first encountered in the early 20th century, it was speculated that they might be a unique species, possibly a dwarf grizzly. The diminutive bears resembled black bears in many ways, but were much smaller with wooly fur that was light brown in color, similar to grizzly bears. Specimens taken by hunters were a little larger than a badger. They were approximately 17 inches (43 cm) to 30 inches (76 cm) long and between 12 inches (30 cm) and 18 inches (46 cm) high. The bears weighed between 23 pounds (10 kg) and 35 pounds (16 kg). Gray hair on their muzzles along with well-worn claws and teeth indicated that some of the specimens were adult bears.

One of the first lava bear specimens taken in the wild was mounted and sent to United States Bureau of Biological Survey in Washington, District of Columbia. Eventually, scientists determined that lava bears were American black bears (Ursus americanus) stunted by malnutrition caused by the austere environment where the animals lived and foraged.

== History ==
From 1917 through the early 1930s, a number of people reported seeing small bears in the lava beds and surrounding high desert county of northern Lake County, Oregon. The bears were initially called "sand lappers", but eventually became known as lava bears. The first documented encounter was in 1917, when a sheepherder name O. T. McKendree killed a small bear near Fossil Lake. Originally, McKendree thought it was a black bear cub, but upon further inspection he found the animal was a very small adult bear. He had the animal mounted by a taxidermist. The mounted lava bear was exhibited in The Dalles and later in Lakeview. A photograph of the mounted bear was published in Oregon Sportsman magazine in October 1917. Eventually, the mounted specimen was sent to Washington, D. C., where it was examined by Clinton Hart Merriam of the Bureau of Biological Survey. Merriam, an expert on North American bears, determined that the specimen was an unusually small American black bear.

Publicity generated by the Oregon Sportsman photograph and various newspaper articles about the miniature bear made it a fascinating creature. In 1920, Irvin S. Cobb, a well-known writer for The Saturday Evening Post, organized a hunting trip to Oregon with the stated purpose of finding a lava bear. While Cobb did not locate a lava bear during his hunt, he left Oregon believing they existed. He thought the little bears were a dwarf grizzly or a species of sun bear, unique to North America. After he left Oregon, several of the local trappers who accompanied Cobb began to actively search for lava bears. In addition, the story Cobb wrote about his hunting trip for The Saturday Evening Post increased interest in the animal across the county.

In 1923, Alfred Andrews, a trapper for the United States Forest Service, reported killing a lava bear near Fort Rock. He sent the specimen to the Oregon biological survey office for examination. A year later, Andrews captured a live lava bear. The animal looked like a small grizzly bear, but weighed only 28 pounds (13 kg). It was a male, 30 inches (76 cm) long and 18 inches (46 cm) high. The Smithsonian offered Andrews $2,000 for the live lava bear, but he decided not to sell the animal. Instead, he announced plans to tour the country with the bear. He displayed the bear in Portland, where 8,000 people paid to see the animal. It was also exhibited in Bend and Klamath Falls before being taken to Los Angeles, California. Eventually, Andrews' partner Harry Thrall stole or sold the bear and the animal disappeared.

In the fall of 1924, a second lava bear was captured alive near Summer Lake. That bear weighed only 25 pounds (11 kg). Another lava bear was trapped by L. E. Oster in the lava beds northeast of Fort Rock in 1933. A fourth lava bear was taken alive the following year by Walter Gore and Roy Yeager in an area east of Crescent Lake. It weighed 30 pounds (14 kg) and resembled a miniature grizzly. The last animal identified as a lava bear was captured in 1934 by a forest road crew near Scar Mountain in the Willamette National Forest. It was 17 inches (43 cm) long and weighed 25 pounds (11 kg). It was exhibited for a time in McKenzie Bridge, Oregon before the animal was sold to a man named Alfred Bayne. As late as 1981, scientists were being asked to identify small bear tracks in the Fort Rock area to determine if they were made by lava bears.

Today, it is accepted that lava bears are actually common American black bears. It is also generally acknowledged that all of the animals that were killed or captured between 1917 and 1934 were either black bear cubs or small adults stunted from malnutrition.

== Popular culture ==
In 1924, Bend Senior High School selected the lava bear as the school's sports mascot. The mascot was chosen shortly after a living bear was exhibited in Bend. At the time, it was thought that lava bears might be a species unique to Central Oregon. In 2013, The Oregonian newspaper conducted a statewide survey, asking Oregon sports fans to identify their favorite high school team mascots. Fans from across the state of Oregon, selected Bend's Lava Bear as their top pick for large school mascot.
