= Murder of Kaylee Sawyer =

2016 murder of a college student in Bend, Oregon

Kaylee Sawyer
- Born: 2 March 1993; Bend, Oregon
- Died: 24 July 2016 (aged 23); Central Oregon Community College
- Cause of death: Blunt force trauma
- Body discovered: 26 July 2016

The murder of Kaylee Sawyer, a 23-year-old woman from Bend, Oregon, occurred on July 24, 2016. Sawyer, a Central Oregon Community College student, was walking home when a man with a car, uniform, and equipment that resembled that of a police officer asked if she needed a ride home. The man, Edwin Lara, was actually a campus security guard and proceeded to abduct, sexually assault and murder Sawyer. Afterwards, Lara went on a two-day crime spree through Oregon and California.

== Background ==
Kaylee Anne Sawyer was born in Bend, Oregon to Jamie Sawyer and Juli VanCleave . At the time of her death, she was a dental assistant with Awbrey Dental and a student at Central Oregon Community College.

== Murder ==
Sawyer disappeared early in the morning of July 24, 2016. She had just returned from a bachelorette party when she got into an argument with her boyfriend, Camron Reimhofer, and left their shared apartment again to take a walk alone. Reimhofer attempted texting Sawyer, but she did not want to talk and sent a final text saying that her phone was running out of battery.

Sometime after, Sawyer got into the car of a campus security officer named Edwin Lara. He took Sawyer to a parking lot in an isolated part of the campus, where he raped and murdered her.

Two days later, her body was found off Highway 126 near milepost 100 in the Dry Creek area of Redmond, Oregon. Her death was found to have been caused by blunt force trauma.

== Crime spree ==
The day after Sawyer's murder, Lara fled to Salem, Oregon where he carjacked and kidnapped a young woman at gun point. Lara told his victim he was a police officer and showed her news reports about what he had done to Kaylee Sawyer. He then forced her to travel with him to California. Along the way, Lara decided to stop at a hotel in Cottage Grove, Oregon. Inside the hotel room, Lara handcuffed his victim, forced her to take sleeping pills, and made a series of physical advances leading her to believe he sexually assaulted her.

A short while later, growing concerned that law enforcement was nearing his location, Lara left the hotel with his victim and continued traveling toward California. At some point during the drive, Lara sought to change vehicles to avoid detection and stopped at two rest areas looking for another vehicle to steal.

In the early morning hours on July 26, 2016, Lara stopped at a motel in Yreka, California where he spotted an elderly man near his vehicle. Lara parked, grabbed his kidnapping victim by the hand and approached the man. With his gun visible, Lara told the man that he needed his vehicle. When the man would not comply, Lara shot him in the abdomen. At this point, Lara's victim pleaded with him to let her go, but he again grabbed her hand and forced her to flee with him by foot to a nearby gas station.

At the gas station, Lara found his next victims, two young men and their elderly grandmother, sitting inside a vehicle. After threatening to shoot them, Lara entered their vehicle with his kidnapping victim and forced them to drive off. During the drive, Lara confessed to his victims that he had an "urge to kill" and had already murdered a young woman in Bend and shot a man in Yreka. Lara eventually dropped his three California victims on the side of the road, again threatened to kill them and continued driving southbound with his Oregon victim. Soon after, California law enforcement caught up with Lara and arrested him.

== Legal proceedings ==
Edwin Lara

In January 2018, after pleading guilty to the murder of Kaylee Sawyer, Lara was sentenced to life in prison.

In April 2019, Lara received his second life sentence for kidnapping and carjacking after pleading guilty to the charges.

In July 2020, Central Oregon Community College agreed to pay $2 million to Kaylee Sawyer's family. Three years earlier, the family had filed a federal lawsuit against COCC arguing that the college had provided its security officers with similar vehicles, equipment, and uniforms to police officers while failing to conduct a sufficient background check on Lara. They argued that Sawyer had agreed to get into Lara's car because she had mistaken him for a police officer, which contributed to her death.

== Kaylee's Law ==
On May 25, 2019, Oregon Governor Kate Brown signed into law Senate Bill 576, known as "Kaylee’s Law." The law bans campus security from using equipment and uniforms similar to those used by law enforcement. It also requires campus security vehicles to include cameras, monitored dispatch systems, or GPS tracking.

== See also ==
- List of solved missing person cases (post-2000)
- List of homicides in Oregon
