= Maiden Peak (Oregon) =

Shield volcano in Oregon, United States of America

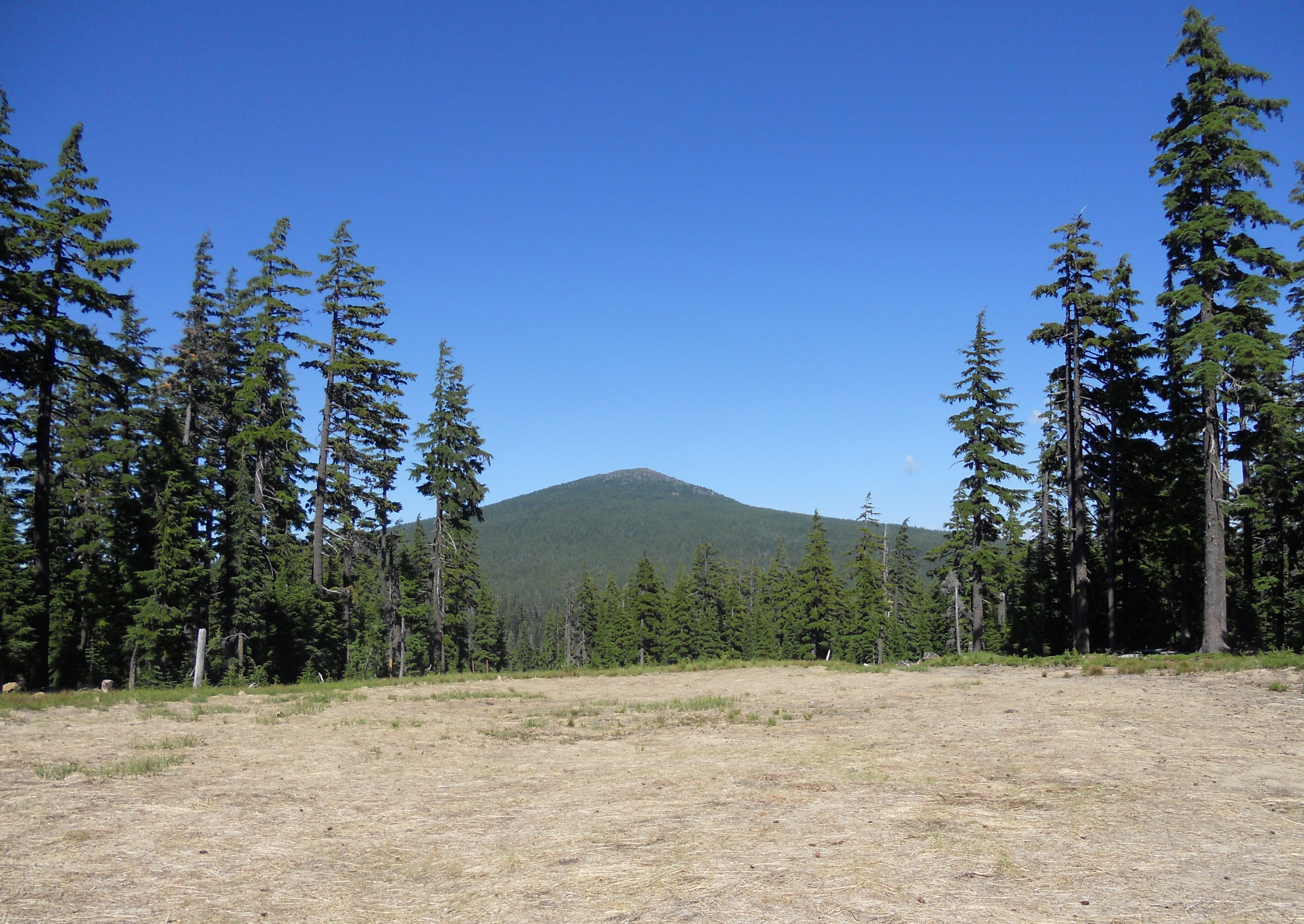
- Maiden Peak as seen from the north side of Eagle Peak

Highest point
- Elevation: 7,823 ft (2,384 m) NAVD 88
- Prominence: 2,578 ft (786 m)
- Coordinates: 43°37′37″N 121°57′53″W

Geography
- Location within Oregon
- Location: Deschutes / Lane counties, Oregon, U.S.
- Parent range: Cascades
- Topo map: USGS The Twins

Geology
- Formed by: Subduction zone volcanism
- Rock age: Less than 250,000 years old
- Mountain type: Shield volcano

Climbing
- Easiest route: Trail

Maiden Peak is a steep-sided shield volcano in the Cascade Range of central Oregon. It is the highest point in the 43-mile (69 km) distance between Mount Bachelor and Diamond Peak. Ice Age glaciers carved a large cirque into the northeast flank of the mountain, exposing magma which hardened in the volcano's conduits to form the numerous rock pinnacles now found in the upper part of the cirque.

The summit of Maiden Peak consists of a steeper cinder cone which sits atop the underlying shield volcano. It is located on the Cascade Crest, which forms the boundary between Lane County and Deschutes County. Also, it is on the boundary between the Deschutes National Forest and the Willamette National Forest. A Forest Service fire lookout tower was built on the summit in 1923, but was removed in 1958. A 5.8-mile (9.3 km) trail zigzags up to the summit from the southwest.
