= Deschutes River High School =

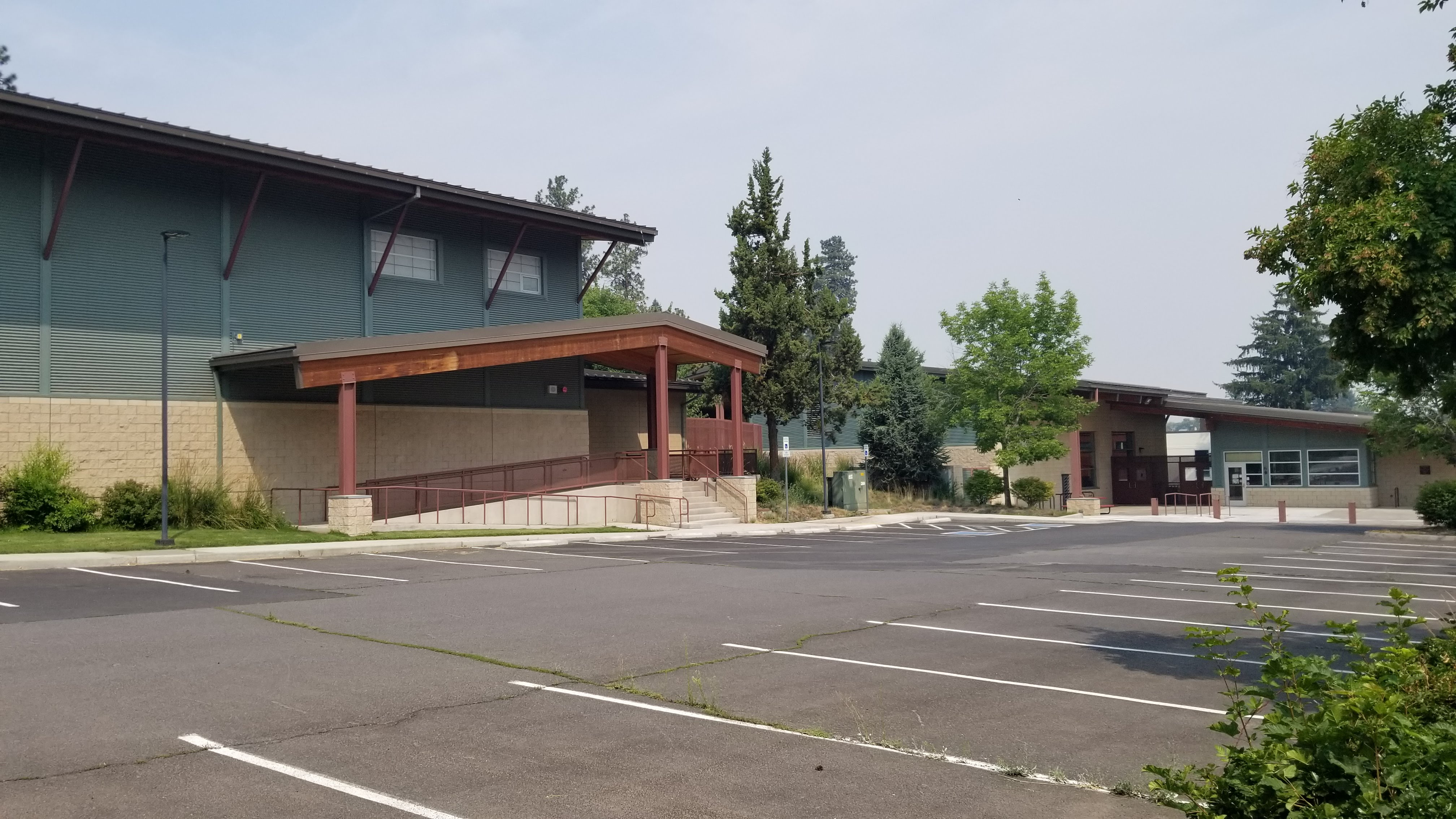
- The Deschutes River High School building as it appeared in July, 2024

Location
- 1291 NE 5th Street; Bend, (Deschutes County), Oregon 97701; United States; 44.062394°N 121.299491°W

Information
- Type: Public, Magnet
- School district: Bend-La Pine School District
- Principal: LaKisha Clark
- Grades: 9-12
- Enrollment: 218 (2026-2027)
- Website: deschutesriver.blschools.org/

Deschutes River High School (DRHS) is a public high school in Bend, Oregon, United States. As a "choice school," admission is open (via lottery) to all high school-age students living in the Bend-La Pine School District.

The school was established in 2026 as the result of a merger between the high school part of Realms Middle and High School, a public experiential learning school, and Bend Tech Academy, a technical and vocational high school. DRHS occupies the former campus of Bend Tech Academy, which was known as Marshall High School until 2018.
