= Seventh Mountain, Oregon =

Unincorporated community in the state of Oregon, United States

- Census-designated place
- Location within the state of Oregon Seventh Mountain (the United States)
- Coordinates: 44°0′19″N 121°22′56″W
- Country: United States
- State: Oregon
- County: Deschutes

Area
  - Total: 1.94 sq mi (5.02 km^{2})
  - Land: 1.93 sq mi (5.01 km^{2})
  - Water: 0.0039 sq mi (0.01 km^{2})
- Elevation: 3,907 ft (1,191 m)

Population (2020)
  - Total: 407
  - Density: 210.3/sq mi (81.21/km^{2})
- Time zone: UTC-8 (Pacific)
  - Summer (DST): UTC-7 (Pacific)
- ZIP code: 97702
- Area codes: 458 and 541
- FIPS code: 41-66385
- GNIS feature ID: 2584422

Seventh Mountain is an unincorporated community and census-designated place (CDP) in Deschutes County, in the U.S. state of Oregon. The community lies along the west bank of the Deschutes River southwest of Bend.

Century Drive Highway, part of the Cascade Lakes Scenic Byway, connects Bend to Seventh Mountain. From Seventh Mountain, the byway runs west to Mount Bachelor and its ski area. The CDP is closely associated with the Seventh Mountain Resort, which includes 21 lodging buildings with more than 200 condominiums.

As of the 2020 census, Seventh Mountain had a population of 407. The CDP covers an area of 2.0 square miles (5.1 km^{2}).

== Demographics ==
Historical population
| Census | Pop. | Note | %± |
|---|---|---|---|
| 2020 | 407 | | — |
U.S. Decennial Census

== Education ==
It is in the Bend-La Pine School District. Zoned schools are: W. E. Miller Elementary School, Cascade Middle School, and Summit High School.

Deschutes County is in the boundary of Central Oregon Community College.
