= Cam McCormick =

American football player (born 1998)

New England Patriots
- Title: Scouting assistant

Personal information
- Born: April 2, 1998 (age 28); Mesa, Arizona, U.S.
- Listed height: 6 ft 5 in (1.96 m)
- Listed weight: 260 lb (118 kg)

Career information
- Position: Tight end
- High school: Summit (Bend, Oregon)
- College: Oregon (2016–2022); Miami (2023–2024)

Career history
- New England Patriots (2025–present) Scouting assistant

Cameron McCormick (born April 2, 1998) is an American former college football player who was a tight end for the Oregon Ducks and Miami Hurricanes. He is currently a scouting assistant with the New England Patriots of the National Football League (NFL).

After suffering multiple season-ending injuries requiring surgeries and 1 extra year of COVID eligibility, McCormick was granted his ninth year of NCAA eligibility extending through the 2024 NCAA Division I FBS football season in 2022. He is thought to be the first football player to have been granted such eligibility.

== Early life ==
Cam McCormick was born to father Corey and mother Debra McCormick in Mesa, Arizona on April 2, 1998. His parents met in Arizona, and Corey had been a college baseball player at Arizona State University. Two years after McCormick's birth, his parents were divorced. Debra suffered a bout of melanoma—diagnosed at one point as stage 4—when McCormick was five years old. McCormick and his mother remained in the Phoenix metropolitan area until shortly before McCormick began the second grade in 2006 when his mother moved with him to Pennsylvania. McCormick and his mother returned to the Western United States in 2012, settling down in Bend, Oregon.

== High school career ==
McCormick attended Bend's Summit High School beginning in 2012. He played on the high school's football team throughout his time in high school, though he suffered an ACL tear during September of his senior year and underwent knee surgery on September 15 of that year. McCormick was all but sidelined for the rest of the season; his team went on an Oregon 5A state championship run, and McCormick took the field only while the team was in victory formation. McCormick matriculated at the University of Oregon in the spring of 2016, leaving high school early to enroll in college.

=== Recruiting ===
McCormick was a three-star recruit, and The Oregonian listed him as the #2 football prospect in the state of Oregon upon the completion of the 2015 Oregon high school football season. Prior to his enrollment, McCormick committed to Oregon in February 2015.

== College career ==
=== Oregon ===
==== 2016: Redshirt season ====
Following his matriculation at the University of Oregon in the spring of 2016, McCormick redshirted his freshman season while recovering from his knee injury. By August 2016, McCormick had been cleared to fully participate in football activities, though he was required to wear a knee brace. In September 2016, McCormick told The Oregonian that the brace may be blunting his speed, owing to the brace's impact on his natural running motion.

==== 2017: First full season ====
Following an off-season workout in January 2017, McCormick was hospitalized at PeaceHealth Sacred Heart Medical Center at RiverBend along with two other Oregon athletes; he remained in the hospital for several days. McCormick, along with two other athletes, exhibited high levels of creatine kinase, indicating possible rhabdomyolysis following their strenuous workout. In response to the hospitalizations, Oregon suspended their strength-and-conditioning coach without pay, among other measures. The two other student-athletes who were hospitalized during this episode later sued Oregon, alleging negligence, in 2019; McCormick did not, saying that he wished to put the situation behind him.

During the 2017 Oregon Ducks football season, McCormick started two games, though his statistics were limited to six catches for eighty-nine yards and one touchdown during a total of thirteen games played.

==== 2018: Multiple leg injuries ====
McCormick was named as Oregon's starting tight end at the start of their 2018 football season, though his season was cut short due to an injury suffered while playing against the Bowling Green Falcons in Oregon's season opener. The injury, a torn deltoid ligament combined with a broken left fibula, occurred after his teammate blocked a defender into the back of McCormick's leg during the first quarter of the game. McCormick had one reception during the 2018 season opener, losing two yards on the play.

==== 2019: Ankle screw malfunction ====
Complications with McCormick's leg injuries and the resulting surgeries plagued him for years thereafter. During post-injury surgery, a screw was placed into McCormick's ankle as an anchor for a surgical suture to hold a ligament in place. McCormick had initially appeared to recovered from his surgery well; in April 2019, The Oregonian described his injuries as "fully healed" and described McCormick as "fully recovered" prior to Oregon's spring football game on April 20. But less than one month after the spring football game, new swelling and pain arose in McCormick's left ankle. The screw had failed, and had caused another fracture. Doctors, however, had initially misidentified the injury as being a stress fracture arising from overuse, and recommended that McCormick merely rest in order for his ankle to heal. Rest was ineffective at resolving McCormick's pain in the long run; sharp pain resumed after McCormick worked out, and the true cause of the pain—the malfunctioning of the anchor—was not discovered by doctors until shortly before the third game of the 2019 Oregon Ducks football season. McCormick tried to play for part of that third game, hoping to delay surgery until after the football season, but he could not bear the pain—a second left ankle surgery, to replace the anchor, was performed, and his season once again came to an early end.

==== 2020: Ankle reconstruction ====
By the start of training camp before the pandemic-shortened 2020 Oregon Ducks football season, McCormick was undertaking limited practice reps, and doctors suspected that he was suffering some sort of tendinitis that was causing him ankle pain. But his injury was not mere tendinitis; he had suffered a posterior tibial tendon rupture caused by two screws that had been inserted during a prior ankle surgery. His pain worsened with time, and he underwent a third surgery on his left ankle, this time performed by the then-team physician of the Green Bay Packers on December 23, 2020. During the 2.5-hour ankle reconstruction surgery, the two ligament-rupturing screws were removed, a tendon transfer was performed, and additional actions were taken to stabilize McCormick's deltoid tendon and left foot more generally.

==== 2021: Torn Achilles tendon ====
McCormick did not participate in spring football during his recovery in 2021, though he was cleared to return to practice in July of that year. He participated in the 2021 Oregon Ducks football season opener against the Fresno State Bulldogs, seeing action on special teams. He also played and was named the starter during the Ducks' game against the Ohio State Buckeyes, though he exited the game during the second quarter after suffering a torn Achilles tendon in his right foot, a season-ending injury.

==== 2022: Return to the field ====
McCormick recovered from his Achilles injury and resumed play for the 2022 Oregon Ducks football season. During the regular season, McCormick scored three touchdowns, caught nine passes, and had sixty-four receiving yards. His first touchdown of the year—and his first since 2017—came against the Eastern Washington Eagles; McCormick was wearing the #18 jersey at the time of the touchdown, which was previously worn by Spencer Webb, McCormick's late friend and teammate who had died in a cliff-diving accident two months prior. After playing in the 2022 Holiday Bowl, where he caught one pass for two yards, McCormick finished his 2022 season with a total of ten receptions and sixty-six receiving yards. He played in all of Oregon's thirteen games, and he started six of them. He was also awarded the 2022 Orange Bowl-Football Writers Association of America Courage Award for his comeback from injuries.

By December 2022, owing largely to the injuries he sustained throughout his college football career, McCormick was granted a ninth year of eligibility by the NCAA. At the time, McCormick was considered as unlikely to be selected in the 2023 NFL draft. By then, he had already earned his Bachelor's degree, in journalism, and his Master's degree, in advertising and brand responsibility. On January 10, 2023, after seven years as an Oregon Duck, McCormick entered the NCAA transfer portal.

=== Miami ===
==== 2023: Transferring to Miami ====
McCormick transferred out of Oregon in 2023, entering the University of Miami. He enrolled in a postbaccalaureate program, during which he performs undergraduate coursework. He joined the Hurricanes for their 2023 season. During that season, McCormick was a starter for the Hurricanes in eleven games, including the 2023 Pinstripe Bowl, earning six receptions for 62 yards.

==== 2024: Ninth year of eligibility ====
When moving from Oregon to Miami, McCormick left the Pac-12 Conference and joined the Atlantic Coast Conference. As a result, McCormick was required to submit a petition to his new conference to receive a ninth year of eligibility. He did so and was granted a ninth year of eligibility. He is thought to be the first football player to have been granted such eligibility, and he has announced plans to return to the University of Miami for another year to play football during the 2024 Miami Hurricanes football season.

=== College statistics ===
Year	Team	Games		Receiving			
Year	Team	GP	GS	Rec	Yds	Avg	TD
2016	Oregon	0	0	DNP			
2017	Oregon	13	2	6	89	14.8	1
2018	Oregon	1	1	1	–2	–2.0	0
2019	Oregon	0	0	DNP			
2020	Oregon	0	0	DNP			
2021	Oregon	2	1	1	16	16.0	0
2022	Oregon	13	6	10	66	6.6	3
2023	Miami	13	11	8	62	7.8	0
2024	Miami	13	1	6	42	7.0	3
Career		55	22	32	273	8.5	7

== Post-playing career ==
On June 15, 2025, the New England Patriots hired McCormick to serve as a scouting assistant.

== Personal life ==
As of 2022, McCormick is estranged from his father, with whom he had not spoken since 2016.
