= Cloverdale, Deschutes County, Oregon =

Unincorporated community in the state of Oregon, United States

Cloverdale, Oregon
- Unincorporated area
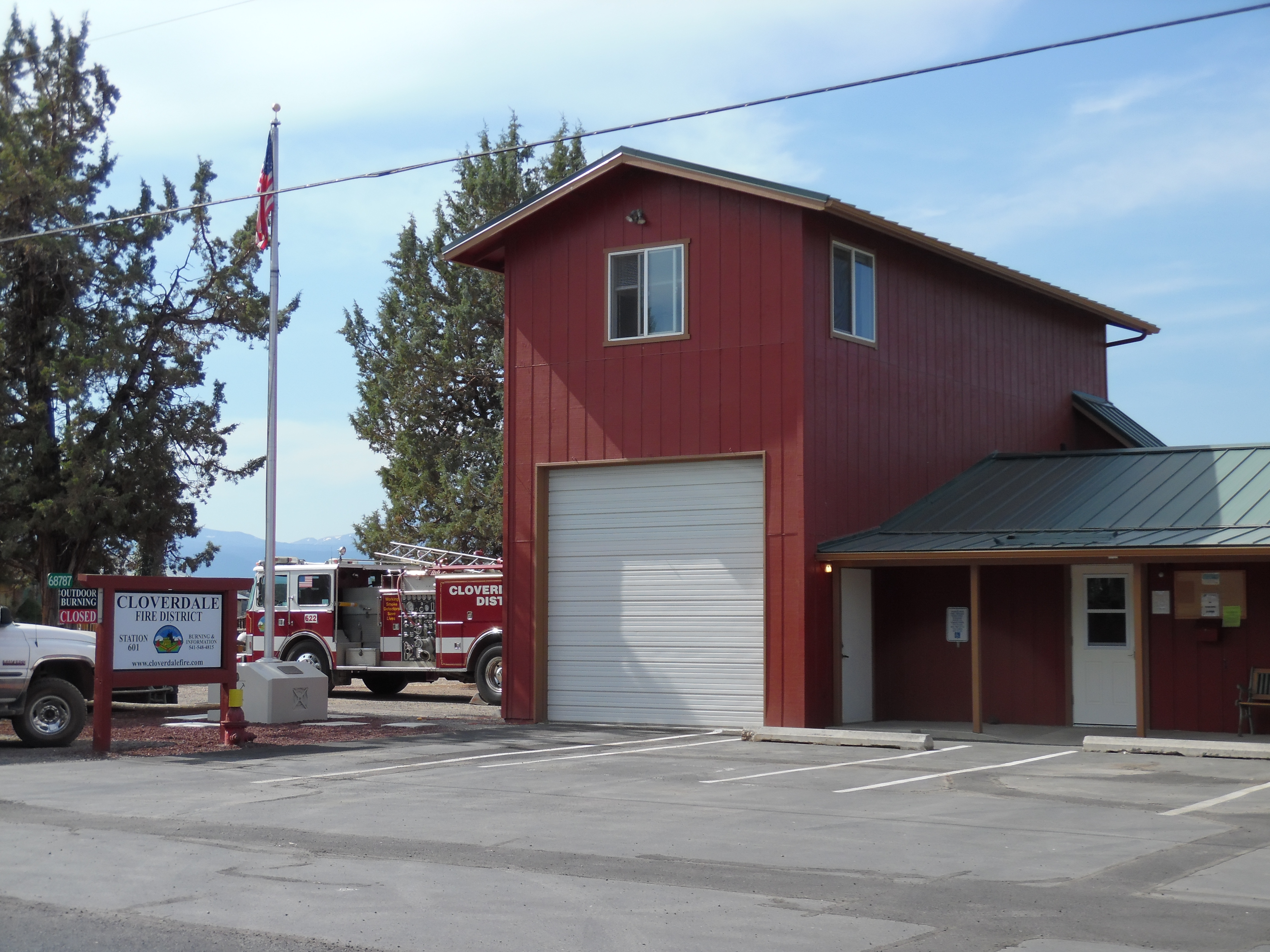
- Cloverdale fire station

- Location in Oregon Cloverdale (the United States)
- Coordinates: 44.29123°N 121.45282°W
- Country: United States
- State: Oregon
- County: Deschutes
- Elevation: 3,084 ft (940 m)
- Time zone: UTC-8 (Pacific)
  - Summer (DST): UTC-7 (Pacific)

Cloverdale is an unincorporated community in Deschutes County, Oregon, United States. It is located about five miles east of Sisters, on Oregon Route 126.

In the late 19th century, Cloverdale became important stop on the A. J. Warrin Road, an alternative route to the Santiam Wagon Road on the way to Prineville. The community provided services for travelers and local homesteaders, with a store, blacksmith shop, and facilities for camping and boarding horses. By the 1920s or 1930s, the route fell into disuse and the buildings either fell down, were torn down, or moved.

Cloverdale was named by R. A. Ford, a local farmer who was also a teacher and a county school superintendent. He surveyed the nearby Cloverdale Ditch, which is parallel to Whychus Creek. The ditch is used for irrigation. Crops grown in the area include clover, alfalfa, potatoes, grasses and vegetables.

The one-room Old Cloverdale School was built on George Cyrus' land circa 1900 on what today is known as George Cyrus Road (a.k.a. Cloverdale Market Road). Also known as the Cyrus School, it is listed as a historic resource by Deschutes County. A new school was built in 1919. The 1919 school shares a site with the Cloverdale Rural Fire Protection District station and as of 2011 was in use as a preschool.
