= La Pine, Oregon =

City in Oregon, United States

- City
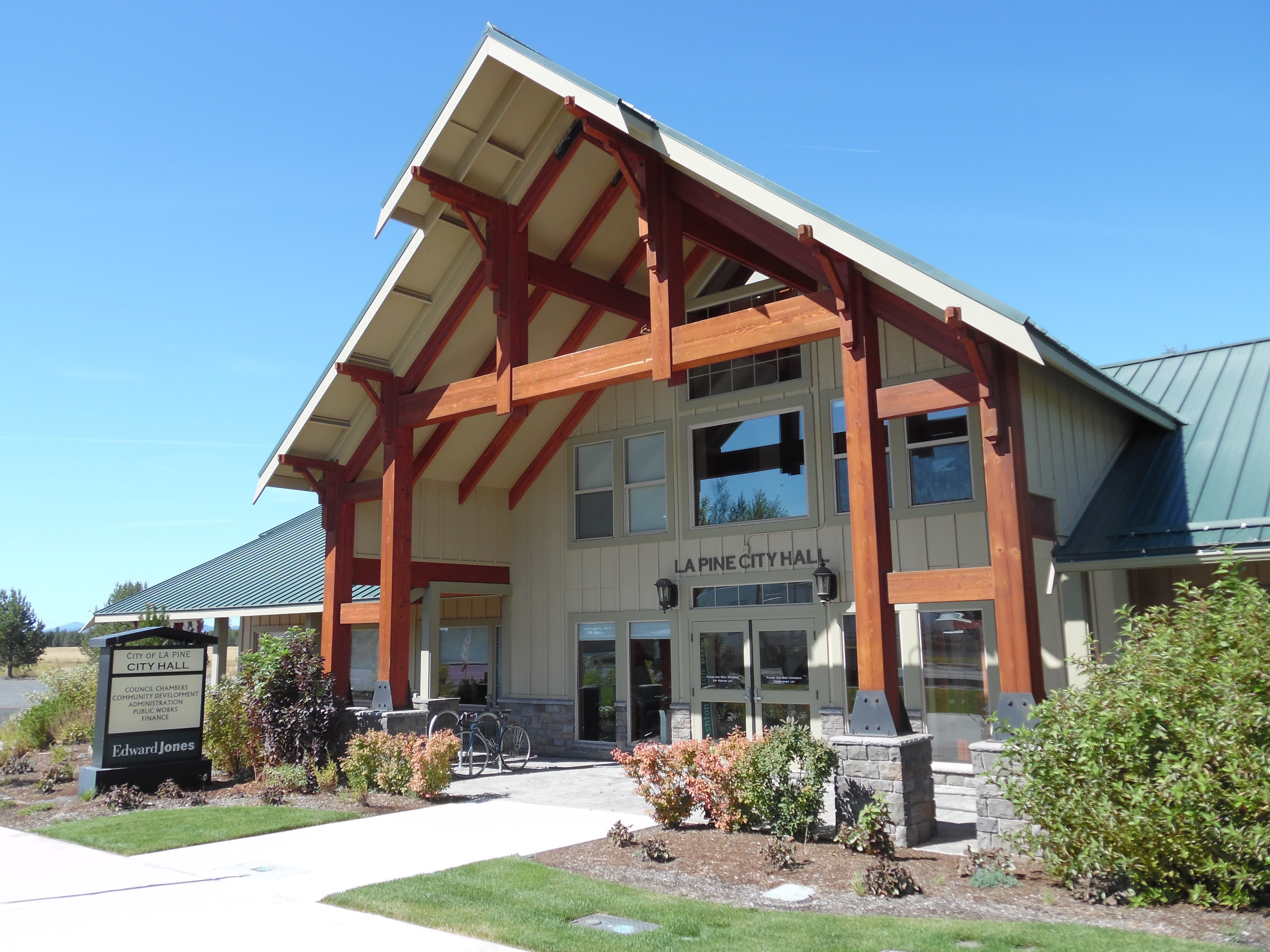
- La Pine City Hall

- Location of La Pine, Oregon
- Coordinates: 43°40′45″N 121°29′45″W
- Country: United States
- State: Oregon
- County: Deschutes

Area
  - Total: 7.14 sq mi (18.49 km^{2})
  - Land: 7.14 sq mi (18.49 km^{2})
  - Water: 0 sq mi (0.00 km^{2})
- Elevation: 4,229 ft (1,289 m)

Population (2020)
  - Total: 2,512
  - Density: 351.9/sq mi (135.88/km^{2})
- Time zone: UTC-8 (Pacific (PST))
  - Summer (DST): UTC-7 (PDT)
- ZIP code: 97739
- Area code: 541
- FIPS code: 41-41050
- GNIS feature ID: 2411579
- Website: www.lapineoregon.gov

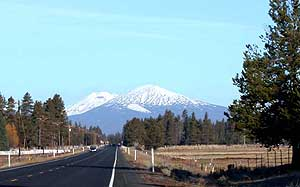
View of the Cascades near La Pine

La Pine is a city in Deschutes County, Oregon, United States, incorporated on December 7, 2006.

La Pine is part of the Bend, Oregon Metropolitan Statistical Area. The population was 2,512 people as of the 2020 Census. La Pine is in an isolated area of Central Oregon, consisting of a loose collection of homes and businesses along U.S. Highway 97 about 30 miles (48 km) southwest of Bend. Several peaks of the Cascade Range are prominently visible from the community.

La Pine is in the valley of the Little Deschutes River, a tributary of the Deschutes River. The river provides recreational opportunities such as fishing, swimming, canoeing and other leisure activities.

== History ==
The area's first European-American settlement was established in the 1800s by French fur trappers. La Pine was founded in the 19th century with Huntington Road as the main street. The original name for the community was Rosland. A post office by that name was started in 1897, followed by a townsite in 1900. Construction on the Oregon Trunk Railroad started in 1908 by the Spokane, Portland and Seattle Railway at the Columbia River. The route was designed to follow the Deschutes River, and the line later became part of BNSF Railway. The line was built to Bend, with the railroad later buying a line owned by the Shevlin-Hixon Lumber Company that continued to La Pine. What became U.S. 97 was completed in 1917, which used the right of way of the Oregon Trunk Line that had not been built south of Bend.

In 2000, a branch of the Deschutes Public Library was built in the community. La Pine had remained an unincorporated community for many years. A measure to incorporate in the 2000 elections was rejected by a 2–1 ratio. In the elections of 2006, another incorporation measure was placed on the ballot (one of two such measures in Oregon that year; the other being for Bull Mountain, Oregon). The measure passed, creating the City of La Pine. The city occupies 7 square miles (18 km^{2}), and at the time of incorporation in December 2006, had 1,585 residents. Much of the former census-designated area lies outside the city limits.

== Government ==
The city operates under a council–manager form of city government. Voters elect four at-large councilors who serve four-year terms, and a mayor who serves a two-year term. As of 2025, Jeannine Earls has served as mayor, with the other council members being Karen Morse, Janis Curtis -Thompson, Mike Shields, and Cathi Van Damme. Fire services are provided by the La Pine Rural Fire Protection District, and the La Pine Library is a branch of the Deschutes Public Library System.

At the federal level, La Pine lies in Oregon's 2nd congressional district, represented by Cliff Bentz. In the State Senate, the city is in District 28, represented by Dennis Linthicum, and in the House, it lies in District 55, represented by Vikki Breese-Iverson.

== Geography ==
According to the United States Census Bureau, the city has a total area of 6.98 square miles (18.08 km^{2}), all of it land.

== Transportation ==
The main road in the city is U.S. Route 97, which runs north–south through the entire city. Oregon Route 31's northern terminus is approximately one mile (1.6 km) south of the city limits. A rail line of Burlington Northern Santa Fe Railway also runs through La Pine, parallel to U.S. 97.

== Demographics ==
Historical population
Census	Pop.	Note	%±
2010	1,653		—
2020	2,512		52.0%
U.S. Decennial Census

=== 2020 Census ===
During the 2020 Census, the 2020 American Community Survey was also collected from a subset of Census-taking households.

==== Population ====
As of the 2020 census, La Pine had a population of 2,512. The median age was 43.7 years, 19.5% of residents were under the age of 18, and 25.4% of residents were 65 years of age or older. For every 100 females there were 96.9 males, and for every 100 females age 18 and over there were 93.8 males age 18 and over.

0% of residents lived in urban areas, while 100.0% lived in rural areas.

In 2020, 6.2% of people had moved to La Pine from within the same county; 3.6% had moved from a different county within Oregon; 1.5% had moved from a different state; 0.2% had moved to La Pine from beyond the United States.

28.3% of people in La Pine claimed Irish ancestry; 26.9% claimed German ancestry; 6.2% claimed English ancestry; 3.1% claimed Norwegian ancestry; 2.0% claimed Italian ancestry; 1.7% claimed French ancestry; 1.5% claimed Scottish ancestry, and 0.2% claimed Polish ancestry. 8.9% of people spoke a language other than English at home, compared to the Oregon-wide average of 15.3%.

==== Households ====
There were 1,041 households in La Pine, of which 28.5% had children under the age of 18 living in them. Of all households, 37.8% were married-couple households, 23.5% were households with a male householder and no spouse or partner present, and 28.5% were households with a female householder and no spouse or partner present. About 31.7% of all households were made up of individuals and 16.2% had someone living alone who was 65 years of age or older.

==== Housing ====
There were 1,226 housing units, of which 15.1% were vacant. Among occupied housing units, 56.7% were owner-occupied and 43.3% were renter-occupied. The homeowner vacancy rate was 2.9% and the rental vacancy rate was 8.5%.

Racial composition as of the 2020 census
Race	Number	Percentage
White	2,156	85.8%
Black or African American	4	0.2%
American Indian and Alaska Native	26	1.0%
Asian	42	1.7%
Native Hawaiian and Other Pacific Islander	4	0.2%
Some other race	42	1.7%
Two or more races	238	9.5%
Hispanic or Latino (of any race)	126	5.0%

==== Educational attainment ====
9.6% of people had completed a bachelor's degree or higher, compared to the all-Oregon average of 34.4%; 13.1% had completed an associate degree; 28.5% had attended some college without completing a degree; 31.6% had earned a high school diploma or equivalent; 3.0% of people had earned a graduate or professional degree. 78.6% of students currently enrolled were enrolled in kindergarten through 12th grade; 18.0% were enrolled in an undergraduate program; 3.4% were enrolled in a graduate or professional program.

==== Veterans ====
11.6% of people in La Pine claimed status as United States military veterans, compared to the all-Oregon average of 8.3%

==== Employment ====
The employment rate was 44.2%, compared to the all-Oregon average of 59.1%. The median household income was $37,979, compared to the Oregon-wide median household income of $65,667.

78.0% of workers were employees of private companies; 4.0% of workers worked for the local, state or federal government, compared to the all-Oregon average of 13.8%; 2.9% of workers were self employed in their own incorporated business; 12.7% of people were self-employed in their own not-incorporated business or were unpaid family workers. The number of women workers in industries such as Agriculture, Forestry, Fishing and Hunting; as well as in Computer, Engineering and Science Occupations, was statistically 0.0% at the time of the Census, compared to the all-Oregon averages of 20.0% and 27.5%, respectively.

==== Health and wellness ====
The average travel time to work for people living in La Pine was 28.8 minutes, compared to the all-Oregon average of 23.9 minutes. 86.3% of people drove alone to work, while 7.6% took carpool, and 5.1% of workers worked from home.

==== Poverty ====
14.8% of people in La Pine were considered to be living in poverty, compared to the all-Oregon average of 12.4%, including more than 1 out of every 10 of seniors. Of those experiencing poverty at the time of the Census, 21.0% of people experiencing poverty were under the age of 18; 14.2% of people experiencing poverty were between 18 and 64 years of age; and 11.7% were 65 years of age or older.

=== 2010 census ===
At the 2010 census, there were 1,653 people in 698 households, including 412 families, in the city. The population density was 236.8 inhabitants per square mile (91.4/km^{2}). There were 942 housing units at an average density of 135.0 units per square mile (52.1 units/km^{2}). The racial makeup of the city was 93.5% White, 0.2% African American, 1.1% Native American, 0.2% Asian, 0.1% Pacific Islander, 1.8% from other races, and 3.0% from two or more races. Hispanic or Latino of any race were 5.8% of the population.

Of the 698 households 28.5% had children under the age of 18 living with them, 42.6% were married couples living together, 11.6% had a female householder with no husband present, 4.9% had a male householder with no wife present, and 41.0% were non-families. 31.2% of households were one person and 15.5% were one person aged 65 or older. The average household size was 2.30 and the average family size was 2.87.

The median age was 43.6 years. 22.4% of residents were under the age of 18; 6.8% were between the ages of 18 and 24; 22.7% were from 25 to 44; 30.4% were from 45 to 64; and 17.8% were 65 or older. The gender makeup of the city was 48.4% male and 51.6% female.

=== 2000 census ===
At the 2000 census, there were 5,799 people, 2,331 households, and 1,699 families in the CDP. The population density was 197.7 inhabitants per square mile (76.3/km^{2}). There were 2,975 housing units at an average density of 101.4 units per square mile (39.2 units/km^{2}). The racial makeup of the CDP was 95.84% White, 0.09% African American, 1.28% Native American, 0.24% Asian, 0.10% Pacific Islander, 0.55% from other races, and 1.90% from two or more races. Hispanic or Latino of any race were 2.22% of the population.

Of the 2,331 households 26.6% had children under the age of 18 living with them, 61.3% were married couples living together, 7.3% had a female householder with no husband present, and 27.1% were non-families. 20.8% of households were one person and 10.3% were one person aged 65 or older. The average household size was 2.47 and the average family size was 2.82.

The age distribution was 23.0% under the age of 18, 4.9% from 18 to 24, 22.5% from 25 to 44, 28.8% from 45 to 64, and 20.7% 65 or older. The median age was 45 years. For every 100 females, there were 99.8 males. For every 100 females age 18 and over, there were 98.7 males.

The median household income was $29,859 and the median family income was $33,938. Males had a median income of $30,457 versus $20,186 for females. The per capita income for the CDP was $15,543. About 9.5% of families and 13.2% of the population were below the poverty line, including 13.4% of those under age 18 and 11.5% of those age 65 or over.

== Education ==
La Pine schools, such as La Pine Senior High School, are part of the Bend-La Pine School District.

Deschutes Public Library operates the La Pine Library.
