= Bend-La Pine School District =

School district in Oregon, U.S.

Bend-La Pine Schools
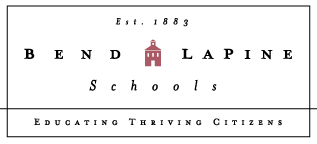

District information
- Grades: K-12
- Established: 1883
- Superintendent: Dr. Steven Cook

Other information
- Website: www.bend.k12.or.us

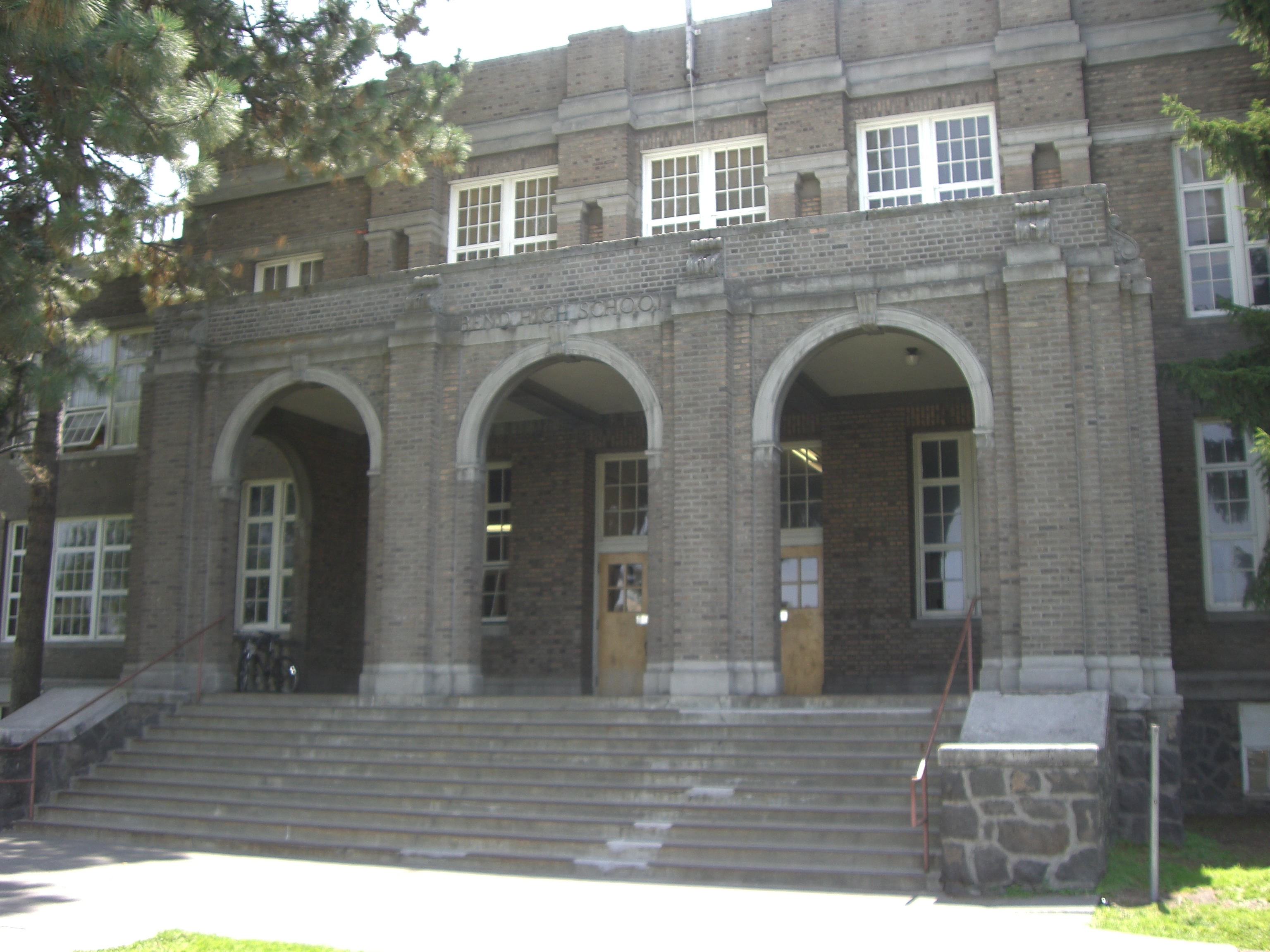
Bend's historic high school is now the school district office.

Bend-La Pine Schools is a school district in the U.S. state of Oregon that serves the cities of Bend and La Pine in Central Oregon and the surrounding area, including Sunriver. The district has an enrollment of 16,878 students, and is the fifth largest in the state as of 2016.

== Boundary ==
In addition to Bend, the district includes La Pine, Deschutes River Woods, Seventh Mountain, Sunriver, Tetherow, and Three Rivers.

== Board ==
The district's school board has seven elected members.

Board members 2021-22:

- Carrie McPherson - Zone 1
- Marcus LeGrand - Zone 2
- Cameron Fischer - Zone 3
- Shirley Olson - Zone 4
- Amy Tatom - Zone 5
- Melissa Barnes Dholakia - Zone 6
- Kina Chadwick - Zone 7

== Demographics ==
In the 2009 school year, the district had 709 students classified as homeless by the Department of Education, or 4.4% of students in the district. In the 2016–17 school year there are 18,034 students enrolled district-wide.

== Schools ==
The district has 30 schools.

=== Elementary schools ===
- Amity Creek Magnet School - at Thompson
- Bear Creek School
- Buckingham School
- Elk Meadow School
- Ensworth School
- High Lakes School
- Highland Magnet School - at Kenwood
- Juniper School
- La Pine Elementary School
- Lava Ridge School
- Pine Ridge School
- Ponderosa School
- R.E. Jewell School
- Rosland Elementary
- Silver Rail Elementary School
- Westside Village School - at Kingston
- William E. Miller School

=== Middle schools ===
- Cascade Middle School
- High Desert Middle School
- La Pine Middle School
- Pacific Crest Middle School
- Pilot Butte Middle School
- Sky View Middle School
- REALMS - Rimrock Expeditionary Alternative Learning Middle School

=== K-8 schools ===
- Three Rivers School (K-8 school)

=== High schools ===
- Bend Senior High School
- La Pine High School
- Bend Tech Academy
- Mountain View High School
- Realms High School
- Summit High School
- Caldera High School

== See also ==
- List of school districts in Oregon
