= Bend Senior High School =

Bend Senior High school
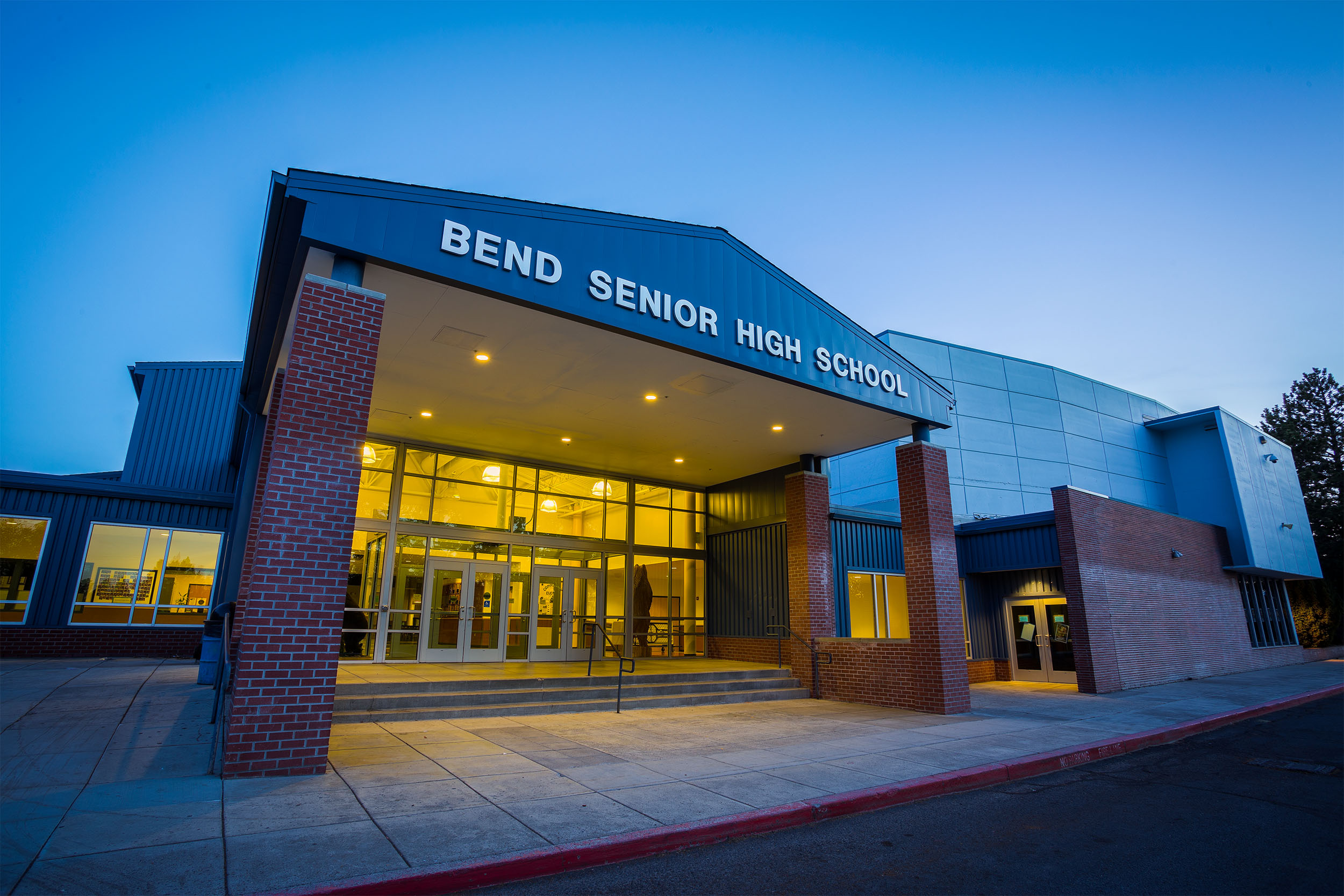
- Main entrance in 2014

Location
- 230 NE 6th Street; Bend, Oregon; United States; 44.052°N 121.296°W

Information
- Type: Public
- Established: 1904, 122 years ago
- School district: Bend-La Pine
- Principal: Christopher Reese
- Staff: 55.08 (FTE)
- Grades: 9–12
- Enrollment: 1,232 (2023–2024)
- Student to teacher ratio: 22.37
- Colors: Blue and gold
- Athletics conference: OSAA Intermountain Conference 5A-4
- Mascot: Lava bear
- Rivals: Mountain View High School
- Yearbook: Bear Tracks
- Elevation: 3,660 ft (1,120 m) AMSL
- Website: bendhigh.blschools.org

Bend Senior High School (BSHS) is the oldest high school located in Bend, Oregon, United States. The school opened 122 years ago, in 1904, but did not graduate its first class of seniors (three students) until 1909. Old Bend High School, the original building, was located downtown on Bond Street, where the Bend-La Pine School District office now stands. The school's mascot is a lava bear.

== Admissions ==
Sometime before 1989, the Brothers School District of Brothers sent older students to Bend High. Circa 1989, due to lower costs, it instead began sending older students to Crane Union High School.

== Academics ==
In 2008, 80% of the school's seniors received a high school diploma. Of 406 students, 325 graduated, 50 dropped out, 12 received a modified diploma, and 19 were still in high school in 2009.

== Athletics ==
Bend Senior High School athletic teams compete in the OSAA 5A-4 Intermountain Conference.

=== State Championships ===
- Boys' Track and Field: 1937, 1938, 1946
- Football: 1940

== Notable alumni ==
- Pat Cashman - Seattle television and radio personality and voice actor
- Kiki Cutter - World Cup ski racer, 1968 Olympian
- Ryan Longwell - NFL placekicker
- Robert D. Maxwell - World War II Medal of Honor recipient, class of 2011
- Donald L. McFaul - U.S. Navy SEAL killed in Panama, December 1989 during Operation Just Cause; namesake of USS McFaul (DDG 74)
- Luke Musgrave - professional football player for the Green Bay Packers
- Les Schwab - founder of Les Schwab Tire
- Ralph Towner - American multi-instrumentalist, composer, arranger and band leader
