= Deschutes County, Oregon =

County in Oregon, United States

- County
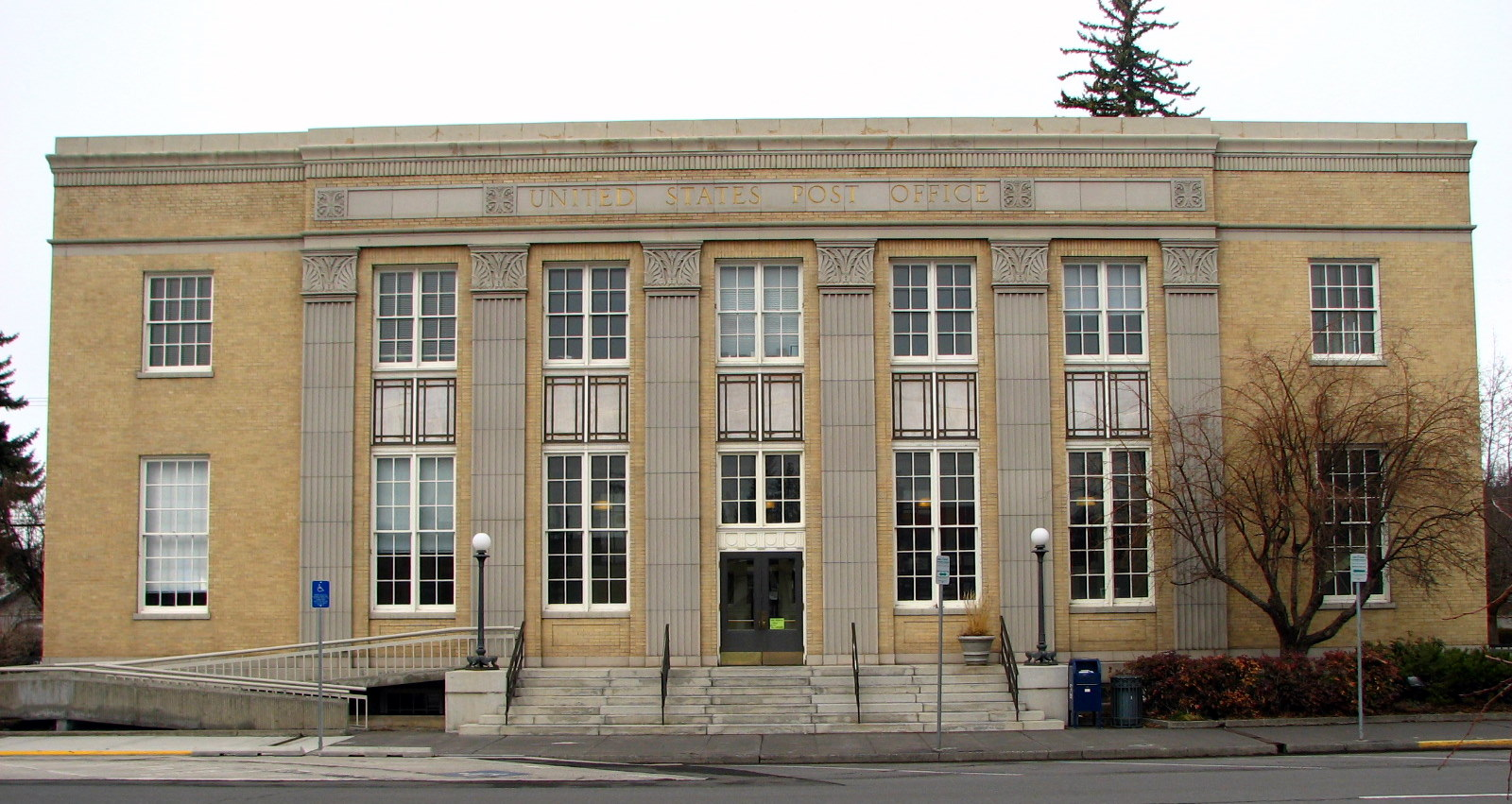
- Old U.S. Post Office in Bend, Oregon

- Location within the U.S. state of Oregon
- Coordinates: 43°55′N 121°13′W
- Country: United States
- State: Oregon
- Founded: December 13, 1916
- Named for: Deschutes River
- Seat: Bend
- Largest city: Bend

Area
  - Total: 3,055 sq mi (7,910 km^{2})
  - Land: 3,018 sq mi (7,820 km^{2})
  - Water: 37 sq mi (96 km^{2}) 1.2%

Population (2020)
  - Total: 198,253
  - Estimate (2025): 213,072 ▲
  - Density: 65/sq mi (25/km^{2})
- Time zone: UTC−8 (Pacific)
  - Summer (DST): UTC−7 (PDT)
- Congressional districts: 2nd, 5th
- Website: www.deschutescounty.gov

Deschutes County (/dəˈʃuːts/ də-SHOOTS) is one of the 36 counties in the U.S. state of Oregon. As of the 2020 census, the population was 198,253. The county seat is Bend. The county was created in 1916 out of part of Crook County and was named for the Deschutes River, which itself was named by French-Canadian trappers of the early 19th century. It is the political and economic hub of Central Oregon. Deschutes comprises the Bend, Oregon Metropolitan Statistical Area and media market. Deschutes is Oregon's fastest-growing and most recently formed county.

== History ==
French-Canadian fur trappers of the Hudson's Bay Company gave the name Rivière des Chutes (River of the Falls) to the Deschutes River, from which the county derived its name.

On December 13, 1916, Deschutes County was created from the southern part of Crook County. Bend has been the county seat since the county's formation. It was the last county in Oregon to be established.

The Shevlin-Hixon Lumber Company also operated within the Bend area processing Ponderosa pine trees.

== Geography ==
According to the United States Census Bureau, the county has a total area of 3,055 square miles (7,910 km^{2}), of which 3,018 square miles (7,820 km^{2}) is land and 37 square miles (96 km^{2}) (1.2%) is water.

=== Adjacent counties ===
- Linn County (northwest)
- Jefferson County (north)
- Crook County (east)
- Harney County (southeast)
- Lake County (south)
- Klamath County (south)
- Lane County (west)

=== National protected areas ===
- Deschutes National Forest (part)
- Newberry National Volcanic Monument

== Demographics ==
Historical population
Census	Pop.	Note	%±
1920	9,622		—
1930	14,749		53.3%
1940	18,631		26.3%
1950	21,812		17.1%
1960	23,100		5.9%
1970	30,442		31.8%
1980	62,142		104.1%
1990	74,958		20.6%
2000	115,367		53.9%
2010	157,733		36.7%
2020	198,253		25.7%
2025 (est.)	213,072	▲	7.5%
U.S. Decennial Census; 1790–1960 1900–1990; 1990–2000 2010–2020

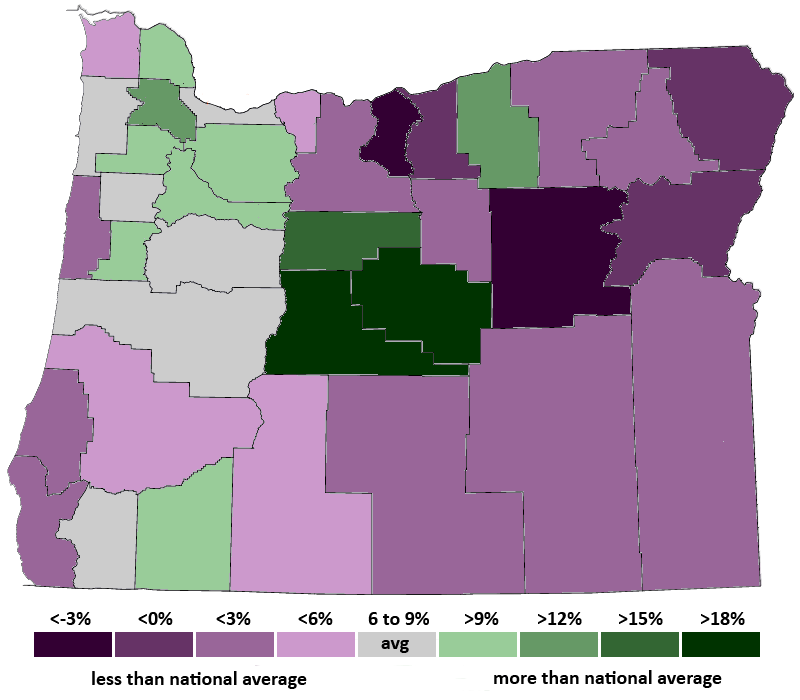
Deschutes County grew by 39.4% from 2000 to 2007, making it by far the fastest-growing county in Oregon, at more than four times the state average.

=== 2020 census ===
As of the 2020 census, the county had a population of 198,253. Of the residents, 20.2% were under the age of 18 and 21.2% were 65 years of age or older; the median age was 42.5 years. For every 100 females there were 98.2 males, and for every 100 females age 18 and over there were 96.3 males. 70.8% of residents lived in urban areas and 29.2% lived in rural areas.

The racial makeup of the county was 85.3% White, 0.4% Black or African American, 0.8% American Indian and Alaska Native, 1.3% Asian, 0.1% Native Hawaiian and Pacific Islander, 3.4% from some other race, and 8.7% from two or more races. Hispanic or Latino residents of any race comprised 8.7% of the population.

There were 80,217 households in the county, of which 27.5% had children under the age of 18 living with them and 22.3% had a female householder with no spouse or partner present. About 23.6% of all households were made up of individuals and 11.2% had someone living alone who was 65 years of age or older.

There were 94,110 housing units, of which 14.8% were vacant. Among occupied housing units, 68.9% were owner-occupied and 31.1% were renter-occupied. The homeowner vacancy rate was 1.4% and the rental vacancy rate was 6.2%.

Deschutes County, Oregon – Racial and ethnic composition Note: the US Census treats Hispanic/Latino as an ethnic category. This table excludes Latinos from the racial categories and assigns them to a separate category. Hispanics/Latinos may be of any race.
Race / Ethnicity (NH = Non-Hispanic)	Pop 1980	Pop 1990	Pop 2000	Pop 2010	Pop 2020	% 1980	% 1990	% 2000	% 2010	% 2020
White alone (NH)	60,227	72,303	107,177	139,470	164,595	96.92%	96.46%	92.90%	88.42%	83.02%
Black or African American alone (NH)	38	78	207	524	786	0.06%	0.10%	0.18%	0.33%	0.40%
Native American or Alaska Native alone (NH)	493	609	875	1,197	1,139	0.79%	0.81%	0.76%	0.76%	0.57%
Asian alone (NH)	257	426	831	1,412	2,421	0.41%	0.57%	0.72%	0.90%	1.22%
Native Hawaiian or Pacific Islander alone (NH)	x	x	81	183	258	x	x	0.07%	0.12%	0.13%
Other race alone (NH)	75	16	77	141	1,028	0.12%	0.02%	0.07%	0.09%	0.52%
Mixed race or Multiracial (NH)	x	x	1,815	3,088	10,789	x	x	1.57%	1.96%	5.44%
Hispanic or Latino (any race)	1,052	1,526	4,304	11,718	17,237	1.69%	2.04%	3.73%	7.43%	8.69%
Total	62,142	74,958	115,367	157,733	198,253	100.00%	100.00%	100.00%	100.00%	100.00%

=== American Community Survey 2025 data ===
The United States Census Bureau estimated that in 2025, Deschutes County’s population was 213.072. It was also estimated that the county's population was 82,41% Non-Hispanic White, 10,37% Hispanic or Latino, 0,53% Non-Hispanic Black, 1,56% Asian, 0,59% Native American, 0,14% Pacific Islander, and 4,39% Multiracial.

Total	Population	Percentage
Non-Hispanic White	175.599	82,41%
Hispanic or Latino	22.099	10,37%
Non-Hispanic Black	1.139	0,53%
Asian	3.330	1,56%
Native American	1.266	0,59%
Pacific Islander	293	0,14%
Non-Hispanic Multiracial	9.346	4,39%

=== 2010 census ===
As of the 2010 census, there were 157,733 people, 64,090 households, and 43,062 families living in the county. The population density was 52.3 inhabitants per square mile (20.2 inhabitants/km^{2}). There were 80,139 housing units at an average density of 26.6 units per square mile (10.3 units/km^{2}). The racial makeup of the county was 92.2% white, 0.9% Asian, 0.9% American Indian, 0.4% black or African American, 0.1% Pacific islander, 3.0% from other races, and 2.5% from two or more races. Those of Hispanic or Latino origin made up 7.4% of the population. In terms of ancestry, 24.0% were German, 15.3% were Irish, 14.5% were English, and 4.8% were American.

Of the 64,090 households, 30.8% had children under the age of 18 living with them, 53.4% were married couples living together, 9.4% had a female householder with no husband present, 32.8% were non-families, and 24.1% of all households were made up of individuals. The average household size was 2.44 and the average family size was 2.88. The median age was 40.2 years.

The median income for a household in the county was $53,071 and the median income for a family was $61,605. Males had a median income of $43,543 versus $33,207 for females. The per capita income for the county was $27,920. About 7.6% of families and 10.5% of the population were below the poverty line, including 14.9% of those under age 18 and 7.7% of those age 65 or over.

=== 2000 census ===
As of the census of 2000, there were 115,367 people, 45,595 households, and 31,962 families living in the county. The population density was 38 people per square mile (15 people/km^{2}). There were 54,583 housing units at an average density of 18 units per square mile (6.9/km^{2}). The racial makeup of the county was 94.85% White, 0.19% Black or African American, 0.83% Native American, 0.74% Asian, 0.07% Pacific Islander, 1.36% from other races, and 1.96% from two or more races. 3.73% of the population were Hispanic or Latino of any race. 19.4% were of German, 13.2% English, 11.4% Irish and 9.1% American ancestry.

There were 45,595 households, out of which 32.10% had children under the age of 18 living with them, 58.00% were married couples living together, 8.50% had a female householder with no husband present, and 29.90% were non-families. 22.00% of all households were made up of individuals, and 7.70% had someone living alone who was 65 years of age or older. The average household size was 2.50 and the average family size was 2.91.

In the county, 24.80% of the population was under the age of 18, 7.80% from 18 to 24, 28.60% from 25 to 44, 25.70% from 45 to 64, and 13.10% was 65 years of age or older. The median age was 38 years. For every 100 females there were 98.70 males. For every 100 females age 18 and over, there were 97.00 males.

The median income for a household in the county was $41,847, and the median income for a family was $48,403. Males had a median income of $34,070 versus $25,069 for females. The per capita income for the county was $21,767. About 6.30% of families and 9.30% of the population were below the poverty line, including 10.40% of those under age 18 and 6.10% of those age 65 or over.

== Communities ==
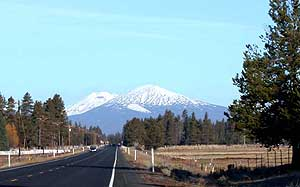
View of the Cascades near La Pine, Oregon

=== Cities ===
- Bend (county seat)
- La Pine
- Redmond
- Sisters

=== Census-designated places ===
- Black Butte Ranch
- Crooked River Ranch
- Deschutes River Woods
- Eagle Crest
- Pronghorn
- Seventh Mountain
- Sunriver
- Terrebonne
- Three Rivers South
- Tetherow
- Tumalo

=== Former Community ===
- Shevlin

=== Resort Communities, etc. ===
- Black Butte Ranch
- Eagle Crest
- Pronghorn
- Sunriver

=== Unincorporated communities ===
- Alfalfa
- Brothers
- Cloverdale
- Deschutes
- Elk Lake
- Hampton
- Millican

== Politics ==
From the 1920s to the 1980s, Deschutes County was a swing county, going for the winner of the Presidency every time but 1960. From the 1990s to the 2010s, Deschutes County fell politically more in line with the conservative eastern side of Oregon than the liberal western side. However, this has shifted in recent years, due in large part to the rapid growth and urbanization within the city of Bend. By January 2021, a narrow plurality of registered voters in Deschutes County were registered with the Democratic Party. In addition, Joe Biden carried the county with 52.7% of the vote in the 2020 presidential election compared to 44.4% of the vote for Donald Trump, thereby marking the first time a Democratic Party candidate won the county since 1992 and the first time a Democratic Party candidate received a majority of the vote in the county since 1964.

In 2024, Deschutes County swung to the left, despite Oregon and the country swinging to the right. Kamala Harris received 53.47% of the vote, the highest vote share for a Democratic presidential nominee since 1964 in the county. This was also the first time the county voted for a losing Democratic nominee.

In 2008, the Democratic Party won the Oregon House seat encompassing the city of Bend, becoming the only Democratic-controlled district east of the Cascades, though the Republicans retook the seat in 2010. Republicans would hold the seat for the remainder of the decade until 2020, when Democrat Jason Kropf was elected to the State House and re-elected in 2022. In 2022, the 53rd District, including Redmond, elected Democrat Emerson Levy to the Oregon House. Portions of Deschutes County also fall into the 55th, 59th and 60th House Districts, respectively held by Republicans E. Werner Reschke, Vikki Breese-Iverson and Mark Owens. Deschutes County is also divvied up between the 27th, 28th and 30th Senate Districts in the Oregon Senate, respectively represented by Republicans Tim Knopp, Dennis Linthicum and Lynn Findley.

Deschutes County is currently one of 11 counties in Oregon in which therapeutic psilocybin is legal.

United States presidential election results for Deschutes County, Oregon
Year	Republican		Democratic		Third party(ies)	
Year	No.	%	No.	%	No.	%
1920	1,649	54.24%	1,072	35.26%	319	10.49%
1924	2,321	53.02%	1,015	23.18%	1,042	23.80%
1928	2,815	60.83%	1,702	36.78%	111	2.40%
1932	1,697	33.57%	2,962	58.60%	396	7.83%
1936	1,299	22.08%	4,278	72.71%	307	5.22%
1940	2,603	34.93%	4,775	64.07%	75	1.01%
1944	2,547	39.64%	3,807	59.24%	72	1.12%
1948	3,463	48.35%	3,499	48.85%	201	2.81%
1952	5,776	64.28%	3,174	35.32%	36	0.40%
1956	5,399	56.83%	4,102	43.17%	0	0.00%
1960	5,145	51.74%	4,776	48.03%	23	0.23%
1964	3,148	31.18%	6,947	68.82%	0	0.00%
1968	5,599	49.86%	4,859	43.27%	772	6.87%
1972	7,747	52.28%	6,319	42.64%	753	5.08%
1976	9,054	46.71%	9,480	48.91%	848	4.38%
1980	15,186	52.89%	9,641	33.57%	3,888	13.54%
1984	19,323	62.20%	11,671	37.57%	72	0.23%
1988	16,425	52.37%	14,264	45.48%	677	2.16%
1992	15,655	35.65%	15,693	35.73%	12,570	28.62%
1996	21,135	46.67%	17,151	37.88%	6,996	15.45%
2000	32,132	55.51%	22,061	38.11%	3,692	6.38%
2004	41,757	56.39%	31,179	42.11%	1,112	1.50%
2008	39,064	48.96%	38,819	48.66%	1,899	2.38%
2012	42,463	51.85%	36,961	45.13%	2,476	3.02%
2016	45,692	46.36%	42,444	43.07%	10,421	10.57%
2020	55,646	44.43%	65,962	52.67%	3,626	2.90%
2024	54,850	43.06%	68,108	53.47%	4,417	3.47%

== Economy ==
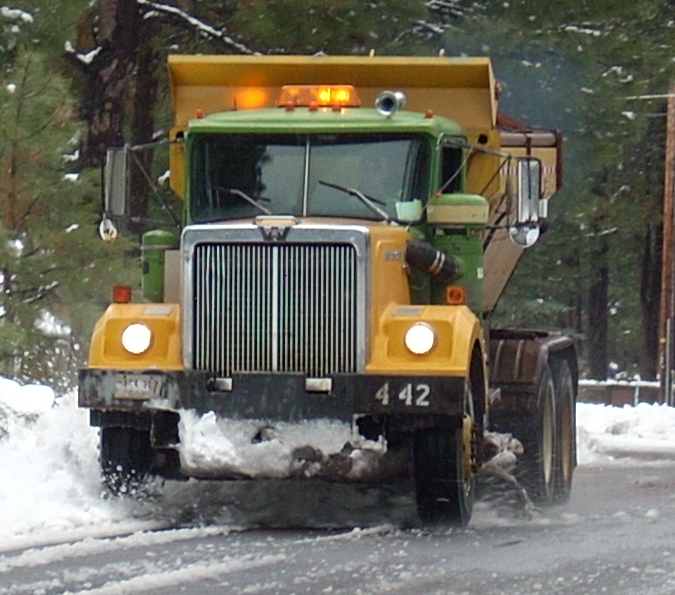
Deschutes County Road Department at work, February 2011

During the 1990s, Deschutes County experienced the most rapid growth of any county in Oregon, largely due to the year-round availability of recreational activities, and its location as the nearest population center to much of the central Cascade Range. Beyond tourism, principal industries in the county are lumber, ranching and agriculture—chiefly potatoes. The Forest Service owns 51% of the lands within the county boundaries.

Deschutes County is the home of four destination resorts as defined by Oregon's Department of Land Conservation and Development. These resorts are major employers within the county. Three of these resorts, Sunriver, Eagle Crest, and Pronghorn, are among the county's ten largest tax payers.

== Geology ==
The overall defining landscape of Deschutes County is primarily marked with that of lava flows. Most of the lava found in Deschutes County issued forth from Newberry Volcano located just south of Bend. Because of this, many lava tubes are located within, including the prominent Lava River Cave. As a consequence, the county is the most cave-rich in the state of Oregon, with over 500 known caves in the county. Other prominent lava flows exist too, especially those related to the Mount Bachelor Volcanic Chain which consists of Mount Bachelor as well as three smaller shield volcanos, and a series of cinder cones.

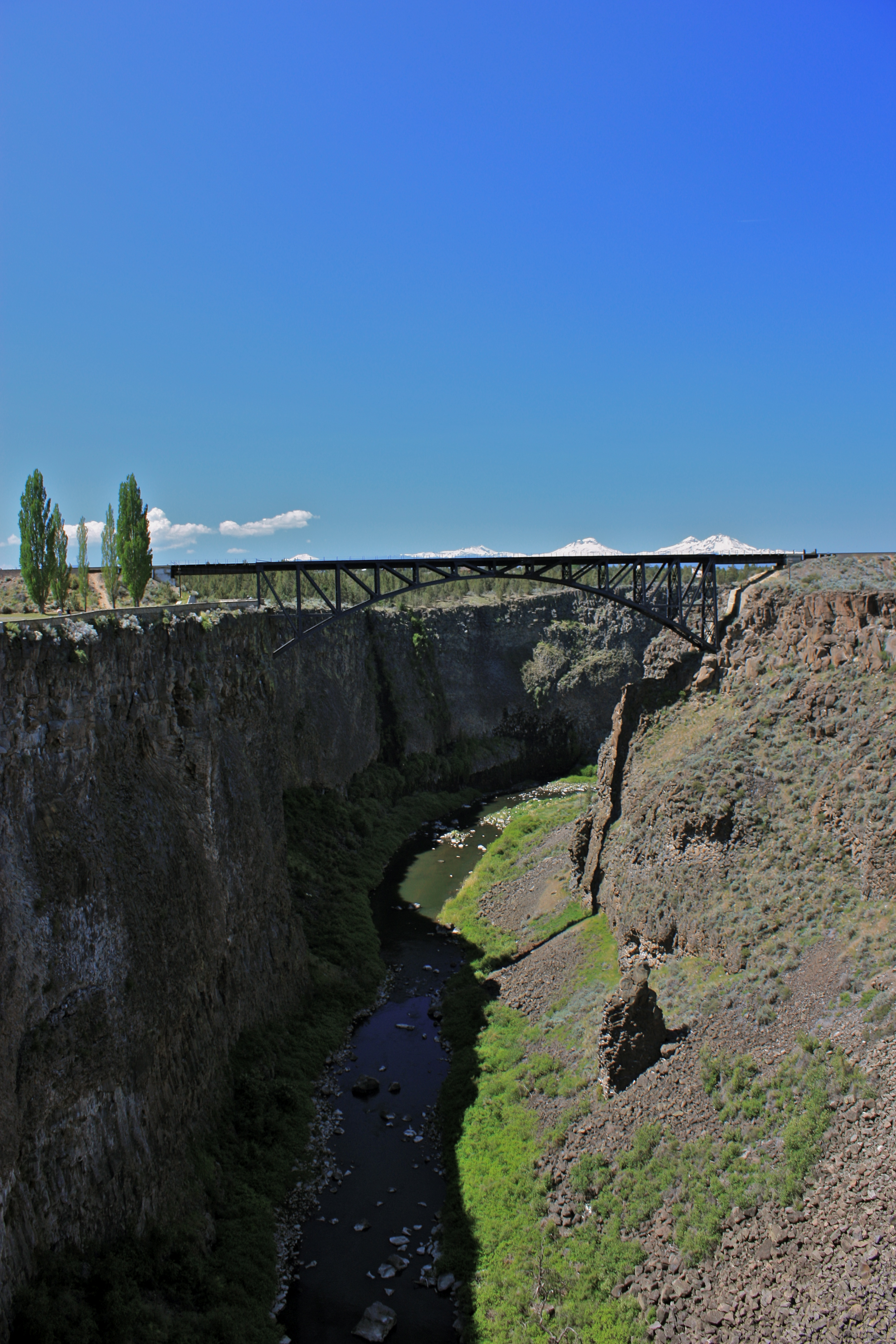
The Three Sisters mountains visible over the Crooked River Railroad Bridge north of Terrebonne

Large volcanoes serve as a backdrop to the city of Bend in Deschutes County, ranging from the prominent Three Sisters, Mount Washington, Mount Bachelor, Broken Top, Newberry, Tumalo Mountain, Maiden Peak and others. A group of geologists have discovered Smith Rock State Park is part of an ancient supervolcano called the Crooked River caldera with a rim nearly six times the diameter of Newberry Volcano's caldera. This ancient supervolcano has long gone extinct. Its crater rim is barely recognizable as remnants mark portions of Powell Buttes, Gray Butte, and the western front of the Ochoco Mountains at Barnes Butte.

On the eastern side of the county, it is mostly characterized by large buttes of much older volcanic origin. Most of these did not create any proper lava flows, or at least none that are known to exist. Some of the prominent buttes include Horse Ridge, Pine Mountain, China Hat, and several others on the county border.

Two main types of lava flows are found within the county. The most common are the pāhoehoe flows which have been partially buried by volcanic ash, tephra deposits, and dirt over tens to hundreds of thousands of years. The ʻaʻā flows are fewer but much more prominent, with the most notable being associated with Lava Butte and the Lava Cast Forest in the Newberry National Volcanic Monument.

== Education ==
School districts include:

- Bend-La Pine School District
- Crook County School District
- Redmond School District 2J
- Sisters School District 6

The former Brothers School District merged into the Crook County district effective 2006.

Deschutes County is in the boundary of Central Oregon Community College.

== See also ==
- National Register of Historic Places listings in Deschutes County, Oregon
