= Central Oregon Community College =

Public community college in Bend, Oregon, US

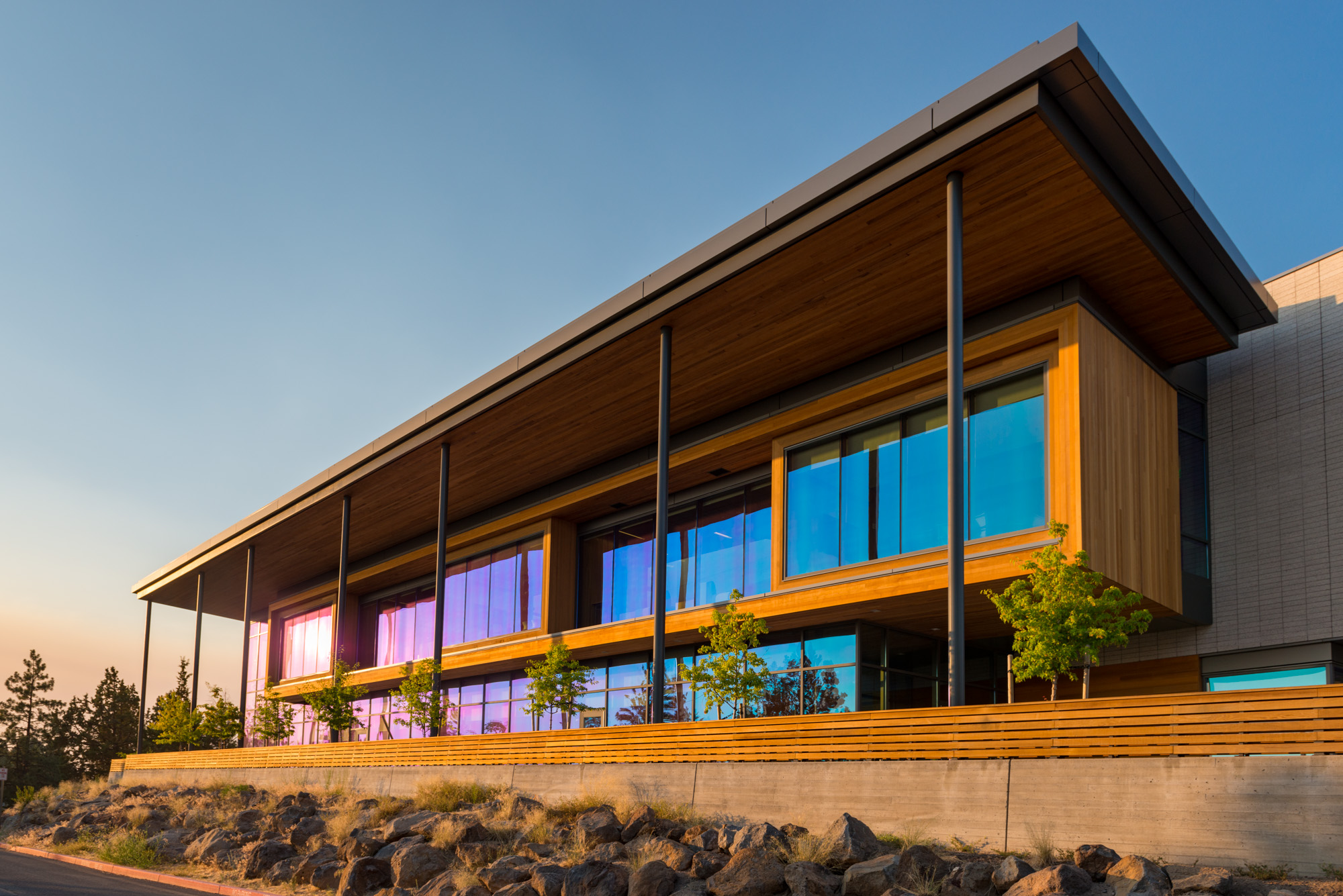
- The Middleton Science Center at Central Oregon Community College in Bend.
- Former name: Central Oregon College
- Type: Public community college
- Established: 1949; 77 years ago
- Endowment: $31.5 million (2025)
- President: Greg Pereira
- Faculty: 130 full time; 50 adjuncts; 171 part time (as of 2017)
- Students: 15,701 total; 8,714 credit students (as of 2017)
- Location: Bend, Oregon, United States; 44.0706°N 121.34857°W
- Mascot: Bobcat
- Website: www.cocc.edu

Central Oregon Community College is a public community college in Bend, Oregon. It primarily serves residents of Deschutes, Jefferson, and Crook Counties. Its service district also includes portions of Klamath, Lake, and Wasco counties.

== History ==
Central Oregon Community College is the oldest two-year college in Oregon. The college was originally founded in 1949, making it almost a decade older than Clatsop Community College, the next oldest community college in Oregon. The 200-acres main campus is located on the west side of Bend, Oregon. The campus has a total of 26 different buildings, the most recently built being the residence hall in 2015. The location provides views of the Oregon Cascades, as well as access to much of what Bend has to offer. The main campus is located near the Deschutes National Forest and Shevlin Park providing access to miles of trails and outdoor recreation opportunities. Central Oregon Community College also has campuses in Redmond, Prineville, and Madras, providing educational opportunities across the Central Oregon region.

== Academics ==
Central Oregon Community College provides students the opportunity to pursue an Associates two-year degree or a Certificate. Programs will either prepare students to enter directly into the workforce or to continue their education as a transfer student to a four-year college for a Bachelor's degree. As of 2018, Central Oregon Community College offers 78 different academic programs, including programs like Automotive Technology, Aviation, Culinary Arts, Criminal Justice, Dentistry, Fire Science, Massage Therapy, Nursing, Outdoor Leadership, and Veterinarian. Outside of coursework, Central Oregon Community College also provides opportunities for students to become involved in clubs and activities. Clubs provide opportunities for students to become involved in groups focused on their area of study as well as become more involved with the student body. Students also have the opportunity to participate in sports.

=== Partnership with Oregon State University ===
Central Oregon Community College has a 2+2 partnership with Oregon State University Cascades Campus offering lower-division and prerequisite coursework that can be used toward the goal of earning a bachelor's degree. Starting Fall 2015, Oregon State University Cascades hosted its first freshman class of students seeking a bachelor's degree.

== Notable faculty ==
- Ray Hatton - geography professor, author, and long-distance runner
- Ken Ruettgers - professional football player (an instructor)

== See also ==
- List of Oregon community colleges
- Murder of Kaylee Sawyer
