= Pilot Butte (Oregon) =

Lava dome in Bend, Oregon

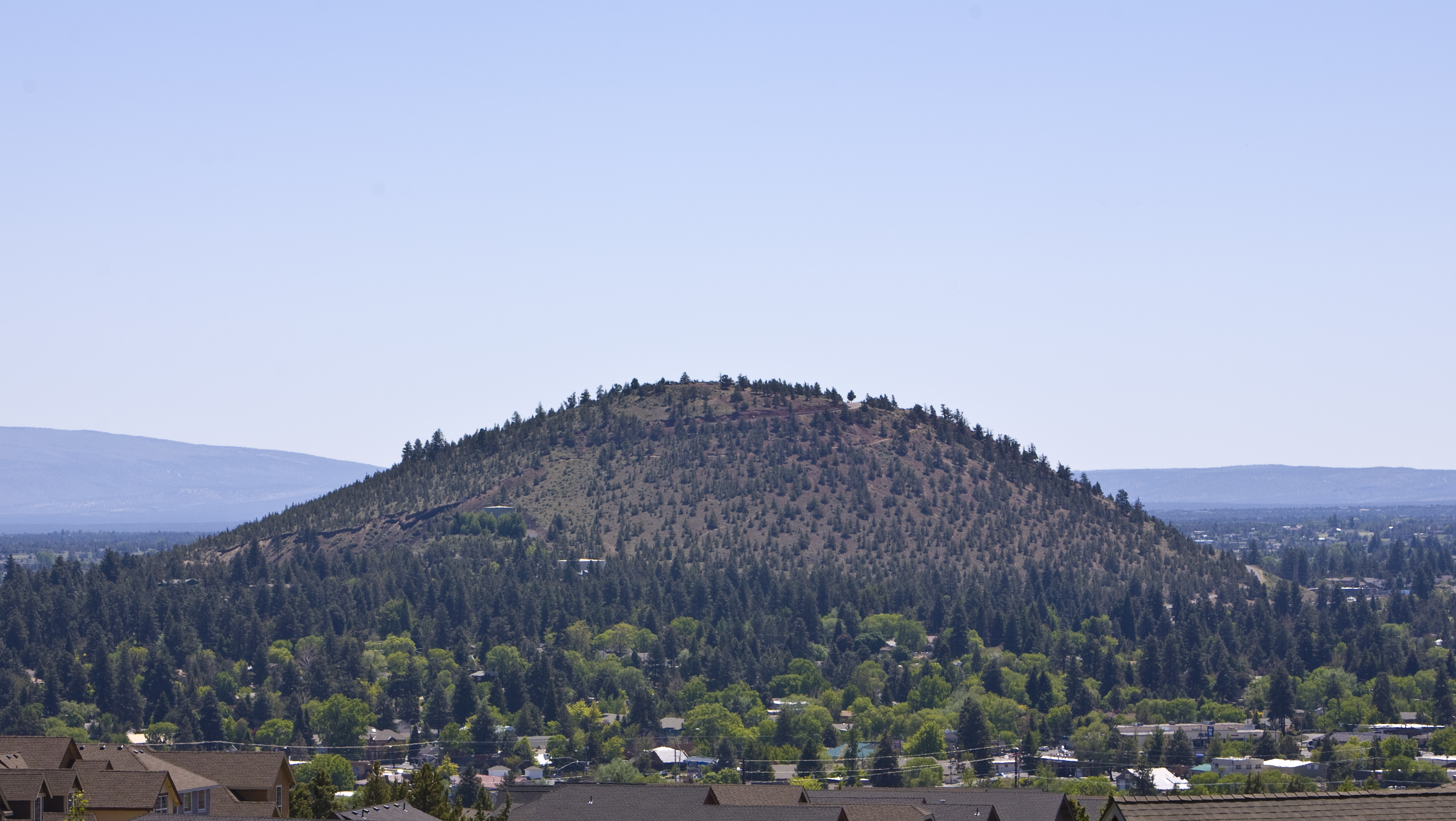

Highest point
- Elevation: 4,142 ft (1,262 m) NAVD 88
- Coordinates: 44°03′38″N 121°17′00″W

Geography
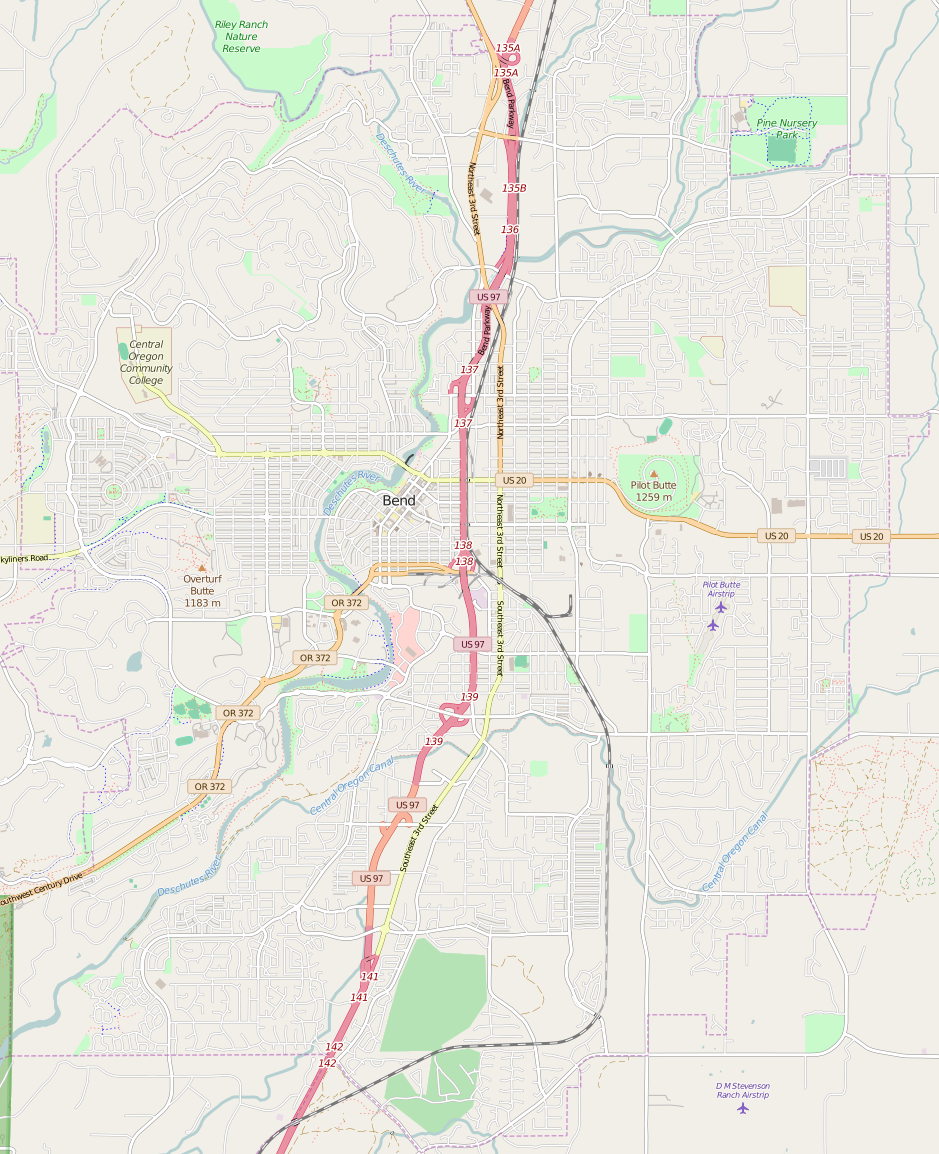
- Location within Bend OR Location within Oregon
- Location: Deschutes County, Oregon, U.S.
- Parent range: Cascades
- Topo map: USGS Bend

Geology
- Rock age: Less than 780,000 years
- Mountain type: Cinder cone
- Volcanic arc: Cascade Volcanic Arc

Climbing
- Easiest route: Road

Pilot Butte is a cinder cone that was created from an extinct volcano located in Bend, Oregon. It is a cinder cone butte which rises nearly 500 feet (150 m) above the surrounding plains. Bend is one of six cities in the United States to have a volcano within its boundaries. The other examples are Mount Tabor in Portland, Oregon, Jackson Volcano in Jackson, Mississippi, Diamond Head in Honolulu, Glassford Hill in Prescott Valley, Arizona and Pilot Knob in Austin, Texas.

The 114.22-acre (46.22-hectare) Pilot Butte State Scenic Viewpoint, presented as a gift to the State of Oregon in 1928, is a Bend icon. Pilot Butte itself is a popular hiking destination with two trails to the summit, each gaining about 490 ft (150 m) in elevation. There is also a 1.8-mile (2.9 km) trail around the base of the butte. A scenic road also winds up and around the cone. In 2018, the park was the most visited Oregon state park east of the Cascade Mountains. From the top, the entire city of Bend is visible, as well as several major Cascade peaks including Mount Bachelor, Broken Top, and the Three Sisters, located about 20 mi (32 km) to the west. Bend launches fireworks from Pilot Butte every Independence Day.

== Geography ==
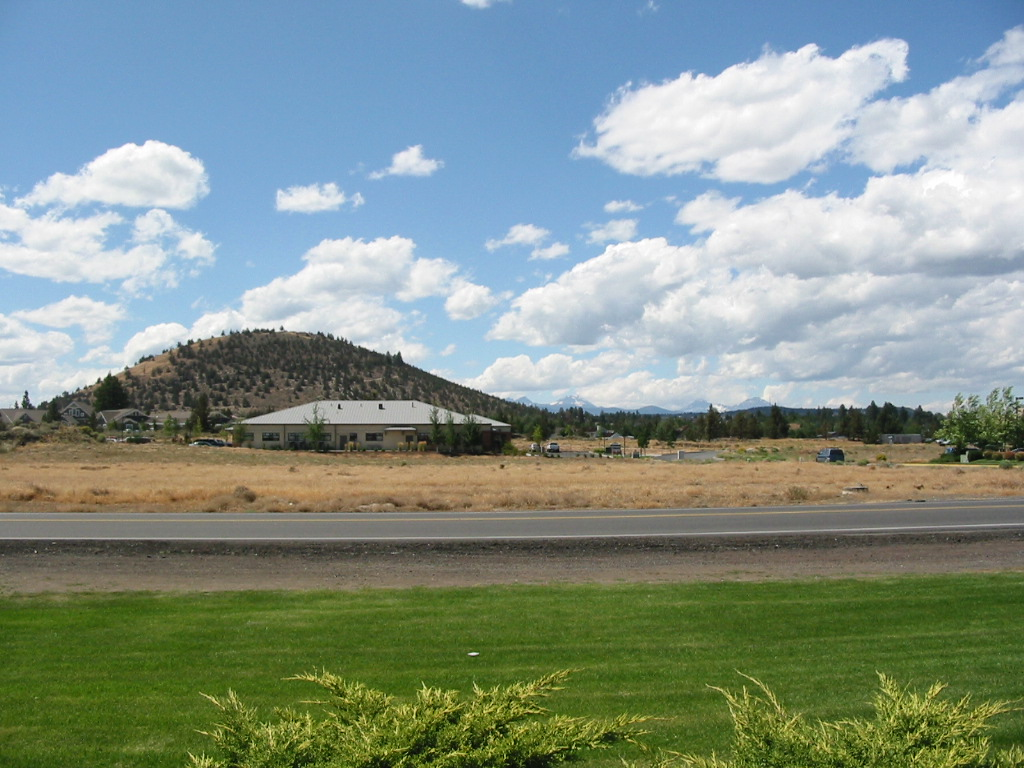
Viewed from suburbia (2003)

Pilot Butte is situated on U.S. Route 20 in Bend, Deschutes County, Oregon. The volcano lies north of Newberry Volcano, east of the Cascade Range, and southwest of the Ochoco Mountains.

The Geographic Names Information System database lists its summit elevation as 4,141 feet (1,262 m); the National Geodetic Survey lists its elevation as 4,142 feet (1,262 m).

== Geology and eruptive history ==
Pilot Butte is a Pleistocene cinder cone volcano. It lies just outside the southeastern margin of the Crooked River caldera, which collapsed and formed volcanic fields of rhyolitic lava flows, lava domes, and dikes including Powell Buttes, Gray Butte, Grizzly Mountain, and Barnes Butte. During the late Pleistocene, eruptions at Newberry Volcano produced voluminous basalt lava flows that extended into the area now occupied by Bend and Redmond. About 78,000 years ago, similar eruptive activity formed lava flows that surrounded Pilot Butte and filled the Deschutes riverbed, altering the course of the river by redirecting it to form a new channel to the west. The interior of these lava flows can be explored at Lava River Cave.

Pilot Butte erupted basaltic andesite, which underlies other lava flows dating to the Quaternary near Bend. There are four major faults in the Bend area, which run from the northern side of Newberry Volcano to 1.2 miles (2 km) north of the point where Oregon Highway 20 and 97 meet. These faults have produced vertical surface separation of up to 39 to 66 feet (12 to 20 m) in their southern components, including displacement of 33 feet (10 m) northeast of Pilot Butte. One of the four is a normal fault that runs for 6.4 miles (10.3 km) in length with an average strike of 26° trending north–west, one of its endpoints approximately 1.9 miles (3 km) southeast of Pilot Butte. Deposits on Pilot Butte's northeastern side exhibit variable degrees of displacement, implying several distinct surface ruptures, and lava deposited by Pilot Butte has an escarpment of more than 66 feet (20 m). Pleistocene activity produced highly porphyritic lava with 10 to 15 percent plagioclase phenocrysts reaching diameters of up to 0.20 inches (5 mm). The lava is composed of 53.5 percent silica and 20 percent aluminum oxide. The volcano's lower southwest flank is covered with white, rhyolitic tephra, which is similar in composition to tephra found at Tumalo Creek; Sherrod et al. (2004) attribute the Tumalo Creek pumice to Pilot Butte. The pumice deposit at Tumalo Creek has a thickness of at least 6.6 feet (2 m) with lapilli reaching up to 0.23 feet (7 cm) in length. White lapilli have phenocrysts of plagioclase and clinopyroxene ranging from 0.039 to 0.039 inches (1 to 1 mm). Darker lapilli are mostly aphyric (lacking phenocrysts).

Pilot Butte is extinct. Its exact age is unknown, though one study dated the volcano to about 188,000 ± 42,000 years ago. The volcanic rock has normal magnetic polarity, suggesting that it was laid down after the most recent geomagnetic reversal about 780,000 years ago. The butte's light-colored soil contains some ash from the eruption of Mount Mazama (which formed Crater Lake).

== Ecology ==
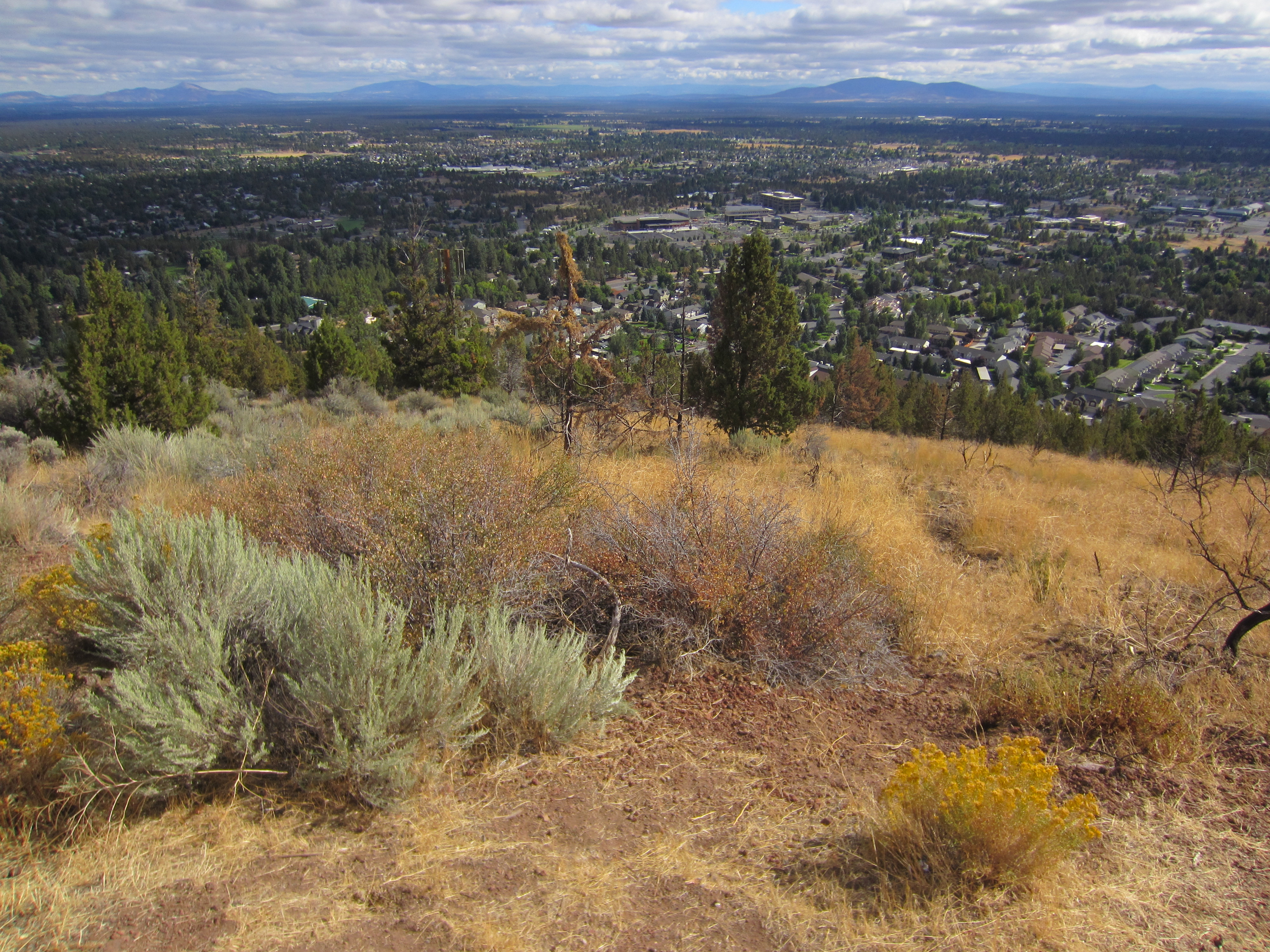
Butte ecology (2014)

The most common tree on Pilot Butte is Western juniper, which is sometimes parasitized by witches' broom mistletoe. Also abundant are sagebrush and the similar plants bitterbrush and rabbitbrush. The invasive species cheatgrass is likely the most common grass on the butte. Wildflowers that appear include sand lily, rock cress, penstemon, paintbrush, buckwheat, yarrow, blazing star, mariposa lily, lupine, and monkeyflower. Ponderosa pine and red currant can also be found. Birds and deer feed on some of the plants, and some animals use snags as shelter.

== History ==
Pilot Butte has been a landmark in the Bend area for many years, including for the Farewell Bend Park campground for travelers crossing the Deschutes River. It was also historically known as Red Butte, though this name is no longer used. The property encompassing the lava dome and its summit park were donated to the state of Oregon by F. R. Welles, Kempster B. Miller, and Charles A. Brown in memory of their business associate Terrence Hardinton Foley in September of 1928. Foley was the leader of the local Elks Lodge until his death in a 1926 automobile accident, and the summit park has a memorial tablet dedicated to him.

Pilot Butte was named in 1851 by Thomas Clark, leader of the first party of European settlers to camp on the future site of Bend. The Clark wagon train approached the area from the east after recovering from the Clark massacre.

In 1932, a National Geodetic Survey station was placed at the top of the volcano. By 1971 this was at the center of a traffic circle atop the butte. In 1984, the butte was near Bend's eastern edge.

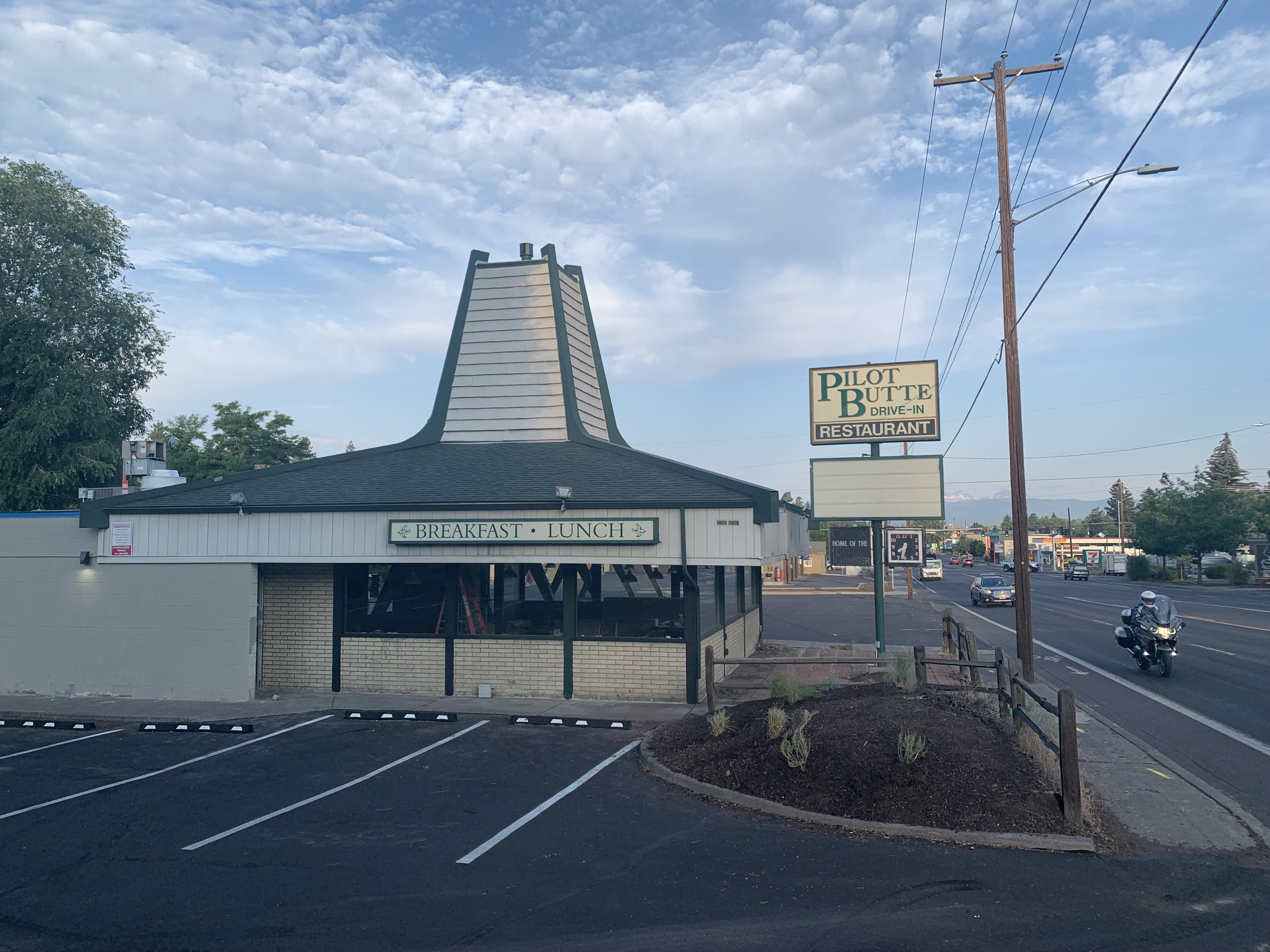
The closed restaurant in 2022

In 1983, a drive-in hamburger restaurant called Pilot Butte Drive-In was opened next to the butte on Greenwood Avenue. It remained open until 2020, when it was closed in response to COVID-19 lockdowns. The property was sold and later reopened as a pizza, beer, and poker establishment, known as the Pilot Butte Taproom or the Bend Poker Room.

== Recreation ==
A winding paved road spirals to the top of the summit, which is accessible by car during daylight hours but is closed in winter. Several hiking trails traverse the volcano, all reaching the summit. Other volcanoes in the Cascades can be seen from Pilot Butte's summit, including (seen from left to right) Mount Bachelor, Broken Top, the Three Sisters, Mount Washington, Three Fingered Jack, Mount Jefferson, Black Butte, and Mount Hood. In 2010, a 1.8-mile (2.9 km) trail was constructed around the base of the butte.

Pilot Butte State Scenic Viewpoint includes more than 7 miles (11 km) of trails on the volcano. The park had 949,968 annual visits in 2018, making it the most visited Oregon state park east of the Cascade Mountains and the ninth most popular in the state. Bend launches fireworks from the butte every Independence Day, commonly sparking small fires in the butte's vicinity.

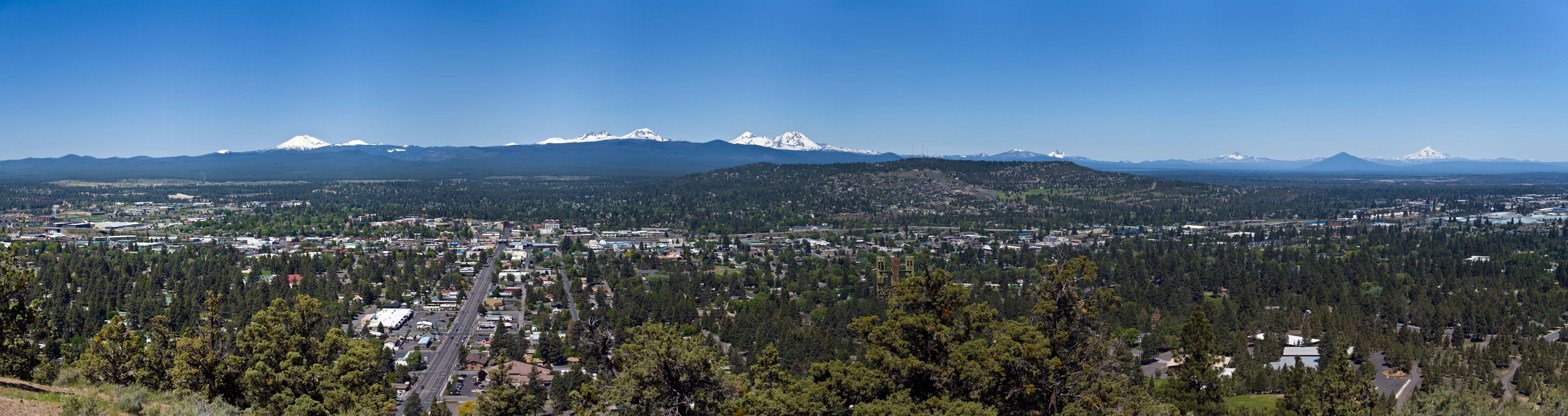
Panoramic view of Bend from the peak (2008)

== Sources ==
- Harris, S. L. (2005). Fire Mountains of the West: The Cascade and Mono Lake Volcanoes (Third ed.). Missoula, Montana: Mountain Press Publishing Company. ISBN 978-0-87842-511-2.
- Jensen, R.A.; Donnelly-Nolan, J. M.; Mckay, D. (2009). "A field guide to Newberry Volcano, Oregon". In O'Connor, J. E.; Dorsey, R. J.; Madin, I. P. (eds.). Volcanoes to Vineyards: Geologic Field Trips through the Dynamic Landscape of the Pacific Northwest: Geological Society of America Field Guide 15 (PDF). Geological Society of America. pp. 53–79. doi:10.1130/2009.fld015(03).
- McArthur, L. A.; McArthur, L. L. (1984) [1928]. Oregon Geographic Names (6th ed.). Portland, Oregon: Oregon Historical Society Press. ISBN 978-0-87595-237-6.
- McClaughry, J. D.; Ferns, M. L.; Streck, M. J.; Patridge, K. A.; Gordon, C. L. (2009). "Paleogene calderas of central and eastern Oregon: Eruptive sources of widespread tuffs in the John Day and Clarno Formations". In O'Connor, J. E.; Dorsey, R. J.; Madin, I. P. (eds.). Volcanoes to Vineyards. Geological Society of America.
- Sherrod, D. R.; Taylor, E. M.; Ferns, M. L.; Scott, W. E.; Convrey, R. M.; Smith, G. A. (2004). Geologic Map of the Bend 30- × 60-Minute Quadrangle, Central Oregon (PDF) (Report). United States Geological Survey.
- Wellik, J. M. (2008). Quaternary faulting of Deschutes County, Oregon (Thesis). California State Polytechnic University, Humboldt.
