= Vort =

- Jewish engagement party
- Das Vort – Yiddish-language daily newspaper
- The Vort (comics), a fictional world by Simon Spurrier

== See also ==
- Voort

]
