= KFXO-CD =

Television station in Bend, Oregon

KFXO-CD and KQRE-LD

Bend, Oregon; United States
- Channels for KFXO-CD: Digital: 15 (UHF); Virtual: 39
- Channels for KQRE-LD: Digital: 20 (UHF); Virtual: 20
- Branding: Fox Central Oregon (39.1/20.2); Telemundo Bend–Riley, Telemundo Oregón Central (39.2/20.1)

Programming
- Affiliations: 39.1/20.2: Fox; 39.2/20.1: Telemundo; for others, see § Subchannels

Ownership
- Owner: News-Press & Gazette Company; (NPG of Oregon, Inc.)
- Sister stations: KTVZ

History
- Founded: KQRE-LD: June 16, 1982
- First air date: KFXO-CD: November 17, 1993
- Former call signs: KFXO-CD: K39DU (1993–1995); KFXO-LP (1995–2011); KQRE-LD: K05HO (1982–2005); K19GC (2005–2007); KQRE-LP (2007–2009)
- Former channel number: KFXO-CD: Analog: 39 (UHF, 1993–2011); Digital: 39 (UHF, 2011–2019); KQRE-LD: Analog: 5 (VHF, 1982–2005), 19 (UHF, 2005–2009)
- Former affiliations: KQRE-LD: NBC (repeater of KTVZ); Dark (2009–2011)
- Call sign meaning: KFXO-CD: "Fox Oregon"

Technical information
- Licensing authority: FCC
- Facility ID: KFXO-CD: 35464; KQRE-LD: 189246
- Class: KFXO-CD: CD; KQRE-LD: LD
- ERP: KFXO-CD: 15 kW; KQRE-LD: 9.3 kW
- HAAT: KFXO-CD: 192 m (630 ft); KQRE-LD: 675.2 m (2,215 ft)
- Transmitter coordinates: KFXO-CD: 44°4′39.4″N 121°19′53.1″W; KQRE-LD: 44°26′12.4″N 120°57′15.1″W
- Translators: KTVZ 21.3 Bend; K32CC-D Montgomery Ranch, etc.

Links
- Public license information: KFXO-CD: Public file; LMS; KQRE-LD: Public file; LMS
- Website: www.ktvz.com

KFXO-CD (channel 39) is a low-power, Class A television station in Bend, Oregon, United States, serving Central Oregon as an affiliate of Fox and Telemundo. It is owned by the News-Press & Gazette Company (NPG) alongside NBC affiliate KTVZ (channel 21). The two stations share studios on Northwest O. B. Riley Road in Bend; KFXO-CD's transmitter is located on Awbrey Butte west of US 97. KFXO-CD is also broadcast as a subchannel of KTVZ (21.3) and by KQRE-LD (channel 20, Telemundo on 20.1 and Fox on 20.2) from Grizzly Mountain.

Portland's Fox affiliate of the time, KPDX, began rebroadcasting its signal into Central Oregon in 1991. It had four translators in the region by September 1996, when KFXO opened as a separate service with local commercials and some syndicated programming specific to the Bend market. In 2006, the station started a local news department, only for owner Meredith Corporation to sell it to NPG, which terminated the news department after more than a year and consolidated operations into KTVZ. The station offers a 10 p.m. local newscast produced by KTVZ.

== History ==
KPDX, the Fox affiliate in Portland, began broadcasting to Central Oregon on April 24, 1991, when it opened a translator on channel 42 from Gray Butte. It was added to the cable system in Redmond at that time. Two years later, the 100-watt Gray Butte translator was replaced with a 1,000-watt translator on Powell Butte, using channel 39. On December 18, 1995, K39DU changed its call sign to KFXO-LP, and by 1996, KPDX had four translators serving Central Oregon, at Powell Butte, Grizzly Mountain, Sunriver, and LaPine. That year, KPDX opened a local sales office for KFXO in Bend and began inserting local commercials into KPDX programs from those transmitters. When it launched local programming on September 30, KFXO functioned as a semi-satellite of KPDX with about half of its programming as well as syndicated programs acquired for the Bend market. KFXO-LP was included in the Meredith Corporation's acquisition of KPDX owner First Media in 1997.

When KPDX and KPTV came under common ownership in 2002, KPTV became the Fox affiliate for Portland, with KFXO continuing. KFXO continued to rebroadcast the 10 p.m. news from KPTV. In November 2005, ground was broken on an addition to the KFXO studios in order to start a 10-person news department and Bend-based, hour-long 10 p.m. newscast. On April 17, 2006, the newscast debuted.

In August 2006, KTVZ owner News-Press & Gazette Company agreed to buy KFXO from Meredith, which had lost in its bid to build a full-power Bend station on channel 51 and wished to focus on larger markets. The deal was finalized on May 25, 2007, and the final independent KFXO newscast aired on June 22. Local newscasts were then provided by KTVZ, with a 11 p.m. airing of KPTV news discontinued.

KFXO began providing a high-definition signal to customers of cable provider BendBroadband in 2008, in time for Super Bowl XLII. Over-the-air, it was broadcast digitally by KTVZ as one of four subchannels when that station began full-power digital transmissions in September 2008. It was not required by law to make the transition on June 12, 2009, because of its low-power status. On July 19, 2011, the station began broadcasting in digital and changed its call sign to KFXO-CD.

In 2013, the KFXO newscast, which had been cut to 30 minutes, was restored to a full hour. At that time, the station also rebroadcast KTVZ's morning newscast from 7 to 9 a.m.

== Subchannels ==
The station's signal is multiplexed:

Subchannels of KFXO-CD and KQRE-LD
| Subchannel | | Res. | Short name | Programming |
| KFXO-CD | KQRE-LD | Res. | Short name | Programming |
|---|---|---|---|---|
| 39.1 | 20.2 | 720p | KFXO-LP | Fox |
| 39.2 | 20.1 | 480i | KQRE-LP | Telemundo |
| 39.3 | 20.3 | 480i | GFXO-DT | Grit |
| 39.4 | 20.4 | 480i | EFXO-DT | Ion Mystery |
| 39.5 | 20.5 | 480i | LFXO-DT | Laff |
