= KPDX (disambiguation) =

KPDX may refer to:

- Portland International Airport (ICAO airport code)
- KPDX (TV), a television station serving the Portland, Oregon, area
