= Van der Voort =

Van der Voort is a Dutch toponymic surname meaning "from the ford" (fordable place), where 'voort' is a form of vort or voorde and "van der" is a tussenvoegsel (surname affix). Other affixes are possible: van de, de, 't. Notable people with the surname include:

- Adolf van der Voort van Zijp (1892–1978), Dutch horse rider
- Ben van der Voort, Dutch cyclist
- Coenraad van der Voort van Zijp (1871–1935) Dutch Orthodox Reformed minister and politician, M.P.
- Colin van der Voort (born 1965), Australian rugby league footballer
- Cornelis van der Voort (1576–1624), Dutch portrait painter
- Herman Jacob van der Voort in de Betouw, Dutch artist of the 19th century
- Michael Pauluzen Van der Voort (c. 1615–1690), Flemish early resident of New Amsterdam
- Michiel van der Voort the Elder (1667–1737), Flemish sculptor
- Nel van der Voort, Dutch gymnast
- Olivier van de Voort (born 1997), Dutch Paralympic swimmer
- Peter van der Voort (born 1964), Dutch physician, professor, and politician
- Vincent van der Voort (born 1975), Dutch darts player
- Wim van der Voort (1923–2016), Dutch speed skater

== See also ==
- Vandervoort (disambiguation)
- Vervoort
