= KTVZ =

Television station in Bend, Oregon

- Bend, Oregon; United States
- Channels: Digital: 21 (UHF); Virtual: 21
- Branding: KTVZ 21; Central Oregon CW 12 (21.2)

Programming
- Affiliations: 21.1: NBC; 21.2: CW+; 21.3: Telemundo; for others, see § Subchannels

Ownership
- Owner: News-Press & Gazette Company; (NPG of Oregon, Inc.)
- Sister stations: KFXO-CD

History
- First air date: November 6, 1977
- Former channel numbers: Analog: 21 (UHF, 1977–2009); Digital: 18 (UHF, 2006–2009)
- Former affiliations: CBS (secondary, 1980–1988)

Technical information
- Licensing authority: FCC
- Facility ID: 55907
- ERP: 131.8 kW
- HAAT: 197 m (646 ft)
- Transmitter coordinates: 44°4′39.4″N 121°19′53.1″W

Links
- Public license information: Public file; LMS
- Website: www.ktvz.com

KTVZ (channel 21) is a television station in Bend, Oregon, United States, serving Central Oregon as an affiliate of NBC and The CW. It is owned by the News-Press & Gazette Company (NPG) alongside low-power, Class A dual Fox/Telemundo affiliate KFXO-CD (channel 39). The two stations share studios on Northwest O. B. Riley Road in Bend; KTVZ's transmitter is located on Awbrey Butte west of US 97.

== History ==
KTVZ went on-the-air at noon on November 6, 1977, as the first broadcast television station in Central Oregon. It was started by former owners Ray Johnson of KMED-AM-TV (now KTVL) in Medford and C. Howard Lane from KOIN-TV in Portland who formed Ponderosa Broadcasting, Inc. The station has always been an NBC affiliate but also began to carry CBS programming on a secondary basis. It continued to air CBS programming until 1988. Efforts to carve out Deschutes County from the Portland television market began in 1980. By fall 1981, Nielsen formed the newly created Bend DMA. Sierra Cascade Communications sold the station to Stainless Broadcasting Company in 1986 which later became known as Northwest Broadcasting in 1997 based in Spokane, Washington.

In 2002, Northwest Broadcasting sold KTVZ to the News-Press & Gazette Company. By 2006, they added more network affiliations to the growing Central Oregon area when The CW was added as a second digital channel. In late 2006, it was announced that Meredith would sell KFXO to the News-Press & Gazette Company which occurred on May 24, 2007. BendBroadband filed a petition with Federal Communications Commission (FCC) to block the proposed sale but it still went through. KQRE-LP was originally a repeater of KTVZ. In January 2007, that station completed a transmitter move that brought it closer to Bend making the rebroadcast redundant. The station then began airing Telemundo's schedule.

== Newscasts ==
On June 22, 2007, KFXO's own prime time news at 10 p.m. was replaced by one produced by KTVZ. In September of that year, the station began to air its newscasts in 16:9 widescreen format. It broadcasts five hours of local news every weekday. It produces a two-hour weekday morning show and nightly hour-long newscast for KFXO.

=== Notable current staff ===
- Cathy Marshall – news director

=== Notable former staff ===
- Lisa Verch Fletcher

== Technical information ==
=== Subchannels ===
The station's signal is multiplexed:

Subchannels of KTVZ
Channel	Res.	Short name	Programming
21.1	1080i	KTVZ-TV	NBC
21.2	480i	NTVZ-DT	The CW Plus
21.3	480i	KFXO-LP	Telemundo (KFXO-CD)
21.4	480i	QTVZ	Ion
21.5	480i	BTVZ-DT	Bounce TV
21.6	480i	Nosey	Nosey
21.7	480i	Confess	Confess

Simulcast of subchannels of another station

=== Analog-to-digital conversion ===
KTVZ shut down its analog signal, over UHF channel 21, on June 12, 2009, the official date on which full-power television stations in the United States transitioned from analog to digital broadcasts under federal mandate. The station's digital signal relocated from its pre-transition UHF channel 18 to channel 21.

=== Translators ===
KTVZ is rebroadcast on the following translator stations:

- K22IL-D Prineville
- K23PN-D La Pine
- K24JE-D Sunriver
- K27DO-D Bend, etc.
- K28QR-D La Pine
- K30JT-D La Pine
- K36OD-D North La Pine

Low-power analog translators in Burns, Chemult, La Pine, and Madras have been discontinued.

== See also ==
- Channel 12 branded TV stations in the United States
- Channel 21 digital TV stations in the United States
- Channel 21 virtual TV stations in the United States
