= Vervoort =

Vervoort is a Dutch toponymic surname. It is a contraction of the name Van der Voort, meaning "from the ford" (fordable place). Notable people with the surname include:

- Ann Vervoort (1977–2010), Belgian dancer and graphic designer
- David Vervoort (born 1977), Belgian record producer and musician
- Désiré Vervoort (1810–1886), Belgian lawyer and politician
- Jonathan Vervoort (born 1993), Belgian footballer
- Marieke Vervoort (1979–2019), Belgian athlete at the Paralympic Games
- Patrick Vervoort (born 1965), Belgian footballer
- Rudi Vervoort (born 1958), Belgian politician, Minister-President of the Brussels-Capital Region
