= KPDX =

Television station in Vancouver, Washington

ATSC 3.0 station
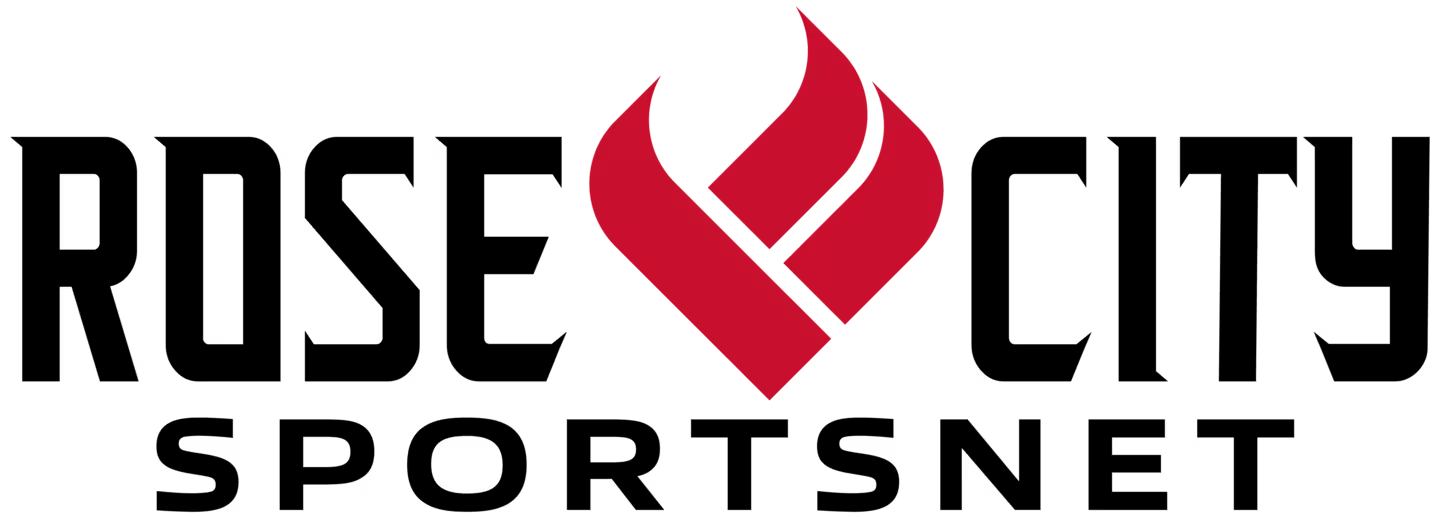
- Vancouver, Washington; Portland–Salem, Oregon; United States
- City: Vancouver, Washington
- Channels: Digital: 30 (UHF); Virtual: 49
- Branding: Rose City SportsNet; Fox 12 Plus

Programming
- Affiliations: 49.1: Independent with MyNetworkTV; for others, see § Subchannels

Ownership
- Owner: Gray Media; (Gray Television Licensee, LLC)
- Sister stations: KPTV

History
- Founded: March 30, 1981
- First air date: October 9, 1983
- Former channel numbers: Analog: 49 (UHF, 1983–2009); Digital: 48 (UHF, 2004–2009)
- Former affiliations: Independent (1983–1988); Fox (1988–2002); UPN (2002–2006); Fox Box/4Kids TV (secondary, 2002–2008)
- Call sign meaning: PDX, Portland's IATA airport code

Technical information
- Licensing authority: FCC
- Facility ID: 35460
- ERP: 741 kW
- HAAT: 528 m (1,732 ft)
- Transmitter coordinates: 45°31′18″N 122°44′57″W
- Translator(s): See § Translators

Links
- Public license information: Public file; LMS

KPDX (channel 49) is a sports-focused independent television station licensed to Vancouver, Washington, United States, serving the Portland, Oregon, area. KPDX is owned by Gray Media alongside Fox affiliate KPTV (channel 12), and serves as the flagship station for Gray's Rose City SportsNet, currently specializing in professional sports coverage of Portland's women's sports teams, the WNBA's Portland Fire, and the Portland Thorns of the NWSL. The two stations share studios on NW Greenbrier Parkway in Beaverton; KPDX's transmitter is located in the Sylvan-Highlands section of Portland. KPDX carries Fox's alternate programming service, MyNetworkTV, as a late-night offering.

A group of businessmen who believed Southwest Washington was underserved by the Portland TV stations incorporated in 1978 and were successful in having channel 49 allocated to Vancouver and being authorized to build a TV station on it. High costs and interest rates prompted the investors to sell a majority share in the permit to Camellia City Telecasters of Sacramento. Camellia invested heavily in programming, and the proposed independent station was reoriented before launch to be a more regional station, including a production facility in Portland. Renamed from KLRK to KPDX before launch, channel 49 began broadcasting on October 9, 1983, as Portland's third independent. Unlike previous challenger KECH-TV, KPDX proved to be more serious competition for Portland's established independent, KPTV. In 1988, the station filed for bankruptcy protection and became Portland's Fox affiliate after KPTV disaffiliated.

In the 1990s, KPDX established translators to extend its signal into Central Oregon and the Oregon Coast and began airing a 10 p.m. newscast aired by CBS affiliate KOIN (channel 6). After the Meredith Corporation acquired KPDX in 1997, KPDX had surpassed KPTV in the ratings. Meredith built a new studio building in Beaverton and took news production in house in October 2000. When Fox Television Stations acquired KPTV in 2001, there was an expectation that KPDX would lose its Fox affiliation. In a deal with Fox, Meredith traded a station in Orlando, Florida, to Fox for KPTV. The news departments were combined, with all newscasts moving to KPTV but the two stations moving into the KPDX studio. On September 2, 2002, KPDX became Portland's UPN affiliate.

After UPN and The WB merged in 2006, KPDX affiliated with MyNetworkTV. Between 2008 and 2014, KPTV introduced a prime time news block and a morning news extension to the station. It was the local broadcaster of Portland Timbers soccer from 2011 to 2022. The station was rebranded in 2018 as Fox 12 Plus and in 2026 as Rose City SportsNet, coinciding with its acquisition of broadcast rights to the Portland Fire of the WNBA and Portland Thorns FC of the NWSL.

== Construction and early years ==
A group of businessmen from Southwest Washington incorporated the KLRK (as in Clark County) Broadcasting Corporation in October 1978 with the intention of building an independent station that would provide programming relevant to the area. The businessmen believed that the interests of Southwest Washington had been ignored by the rest of the state and by media in the state of Oregon. The group petitioned the Federal Communications Commission (FCC) to either convert the reserved non-commercial channel 14 or assign channel 49 to the area. The FCC chose the latter, allocating channel 49 to Vancouver, Washington, in February 1980. With the channel allocated, KLRK Broadcasting Corporation filed for a construction permit to use it in August 1980 and were granted it on January 5, 1981. The group hoped to get KLRK on the air by the end of 1981.

To build KLRK, the company needed $5 to $6 million for a studio site and transmitter facility in Portland's West Hills. By May, the group was seeking a zoning change for its tower site and planned to get KLRK on the air in the first half of 1982. However, Multnomah County officials denied the tower site over neighbors' radiation and aesthetic concerns.

During this process, the Business Men's Assurance Company (BMA), a Kansas City, Missouri–based insurer, proposed to buy 80 percent of the unbuilt KLRK and was initially rebuffed. BMA owned KTXL in Sacramento, California, and had previously owned KBMA-TV in Kansas City. In August 1981, the stockholders agreed to the application, citing higher interest rates as a reason to sell. Camellia City Telecasters set out immediately to purchase programming. When the sale was announced, Jack Matranga, general manager of KTXL and 20-percent owner of Camellia City, told Variety that Camellia City had already spent $10 million in programming and planned another $5 million in facilities expenditures. The objective was to target Portland's heritage independent station, KPTV (channel 12). However, in November 1981, Multnomah County declared a freeze on new tower authorizations while it drafted standards. In July 1982, KLRK finally won approval for the new tower by agreeing to meet the county's new code, which included some of the nation's strictest emissions restrictions, and to offer space to the Oregon Educational and Public Broadcasting Service for KOAP-TV (channel 10).

In the meantime, another independent station signed on from Salem, Oregon, as KECH-TV (channel 22). The station was particularly affected by Camellia's program acquisition blitz. When Larry Black, who also owned stakes in two Portland cable systems, and KECH filed a petition to deny the completion of the KLRK sale on the grounds that Camellia was involved before the sale's completion in contravention of FCC rules, Camellia countered that Black had attempted to undercut its bid to shareholders of the unbuilt Vancouver outlet and even had proposed that it operate as a repeater of KECH. Also objecting to the bid was Cascade Video, applicant for a station on channel 40 in Portland.

The FCC dismissed the KECH and Cascade Video objections and permitted Camellia City Telecasters to buy KLRK in November 1982. Work began to secure a studio within Clark County. Even though the original backers had promised a strong Southwest Washington orientation, Camellia City took more of an interest in Portland, applying for the call sign KPDX—from the abbreviation for Portland International Airport—and opened an office near Portland's Lloyd Center with plans for a second studio in Portland. Officials believed a regional identity and orientation were necessary to attract national advertisers. The station leased the 1 Columbia River building from the Port of Vancouver and opened a production center in Portland at 910 NE Union Avenue. Though master control was in Vancouver, commercial production operations would be in Portland.

After delays in steel shipments for the new tower, KPDX began test transmissions on October 7, 1983, and official broadcasts on October 9. Where KECH-TV had proven not to be serious competition for KPTV, the same could not be said of KPDX, which within months of signing on had a 6% audience share in the area of dominant influence and 8% in metro Portland. It was particularly successful at stealing young viewers from KPTV with its lineup of cartoons.

Rises in the value of local TV stations prompted BMA to seek buyers for its trio of stations—KDVR in Denver, KTXL in Sacramento, and KPDX—in 1985, after a previous proposal to sell to Taft Broadcasting failed to materialize. The remaining Southwest Washington investors sold their stakes to BMA that December. No sale of the group eventuated, but in November 1986, Matranga agreed to exchange the remainder of his stake in KTXL for full ownership of KPDX.

On September 11, 1987, KPDX filed for Chapter 11 bankruptcy protection, citing high initial costs in construction and programming as well as a recession in the Oregon economy. The station's 92 unsecured creditors included distributors of films and TV shows, and it also owed BMA and the Washington State Department of Revenue. Matranga attributed a significant portion of the debt to the delayed sign-on, "During the first three years dating from approval of our construction permit, we spent $20 million on construction, operational and startup costs, with very little income." Creditors voted for a reorganization plan that split the company's operating profits among themselves for five years and provided for the station to be sold after that time.

== Fox affiliation ==
When the Fox network began in 1986, its Portland-market affiliate was KPTV. The network offered programming by the 1987–88 season on Saturday and Sunday nights, but the Saturday night lineup was comparatively anemic. In December 1987, KPTV owner Chris-Craft moved to cancel the Fox Saturday night lineup for KPTV and KMSP-TV in Minneapolis. Though Chris-Craft postponed the decision so it could meet with network executives, in January KPTV went through with preemption of Fox's Saturday night offerings. Effective August 29, 1988, the network moved its Portland affiliation to KPDX. Fox's ratings success helped KPDX accelerate its repayment schedule to the creditors.

During this time, KPDX began expanding its signal by means of translators. In 1990, the station opened its first translator, south of Salem. The next year, it opened a translator on Gray Butte to serve Central Oregon, which was replaced in 1993 with a more powerful 1,000-watt translator on Powell Butte. The Portland-area low-power station "KMST" also began rebroadcasting KPDX that year. By 1994, the station had 14 translators in service, reaching from Seaside to La Grande. The Central Oregon station, later known as KFXO-LP, was spun out as a semi-satellite with its own syndicated programming and commercials in 1996.

Channel 49 logo under Fox affiliation. The "49" logo debuted in 1994. Used until September 2, 2002.

On September 2, 1991, KPDX debuted a 10 p.m. newscast, Fox 49 Presents Newsroom 6, produced by Portland CBS affiliate KOIN (channel 6). The half-hour program provided the first local competition to the hour-long 10 p.m. news produced by KPTV, which continued to enjoy a comfortable lead in the ratings.

Columbia River Television sold KPDX for $20 million to Cannell Communications, a broadcast group owned by television producer and author Stephen J. Cannell, in 1992. Two years later, Cannell sold KPDX and WHNS in Greenville, South Carolina, to First Media Television. First Media also retained the Cannell group's president, William A. Schwartz. That year, KPDX closed its original Vancouver office.

=== New studios and a new news department ===
The Meredith Corporation acquired First Media's TV stations in 1997. By Meredith ownership, KPDX had surpassed KPTV in the 10 p.m. news ratings, attracting twice as many viewers.

Having outgrown the Martin Luther King Jr. Blvd. (Note: Renamed from Union Avenue in 1990.) studios, KPDX announced in 1999 that it would build a new, 43,000-square-foot (4,000 m^{2}) facility in an office park in Beaverton, Oregon, large enough to house 115 employees—including an in-house news department. By this point, it had become clear to most observers, and even in statements telegraphed by station officials, that KPDX was about to break its relationship with KOIN and produce its own local news. The new building was three times as large and owned, instead of leased. An entire area was devoted to accommodating news production. Station staff moved into the new building in June 2000.

On October 23, 2000, KPDX took over its own news production and introduced a 5 p.m. newscast. Eric Schmidt, who had been anchoring the 10 p.m. news under KOIN production, moved over to KPDX as anchor, as did the weather and sports presenters. They were among employees hired for the new news department. The weeknight 10 p.m. news grew to a full hour in April 2001; meanwhile, the new 5 p.m. report performed poorly in the ratings and was replaced in September 2001.

=== Affiliation uncertainty ===
While KPDX's news department was getting established, another development emerged. In August 2000, News Corporation, the parent company of Fox, agreed to acquire Chris-Craft and KPTV. The FCC approved the transaction in July 2001, though KPTV was committed to air UPN programming for a year. Observers expected that Fox would seek to move its programming back to KPTV.

As early as October 2001, rumors swirled that Meredith and Fox Television Stations would engage in a trade involving KPTV and the Orlando, Florida, market. In Orlando, the two companies were in opposite positions from Portland: Meredith owned the Fox affiliate, and Fox had acquired the UPN affiliate in the Chris-Craft purchase. The deal was agreed on in March 2002 and completed three months later, trading KPTV to Meredith in exchange for the stations it owned in Florida, WOFL and WOGX.

The deal triggered an across-the-board shakeup of KPTV and KPDX. KPDX's general manager resigned when the KPTV sale was announced, Meredith announced its intention to move Fox programming to KPTV, and speculation centered on the combined operation being housed at KPDX's studios. The KPTV and KPDX news directors were fired, and KPDX aired its final local newscast on July 14, 2002.

== UPN and MyNetworkTV affiliation ==
The KPDX logo under UPN affiliation. Used from 2002 to 2006.

On September 2, 2002, KPTV became the Fox affiliate and KPDX assumed the UPN affiliation in Portland. All newscasts now aired on KPTV. Local programming in this era of KPDX included a twice-monthly style magazine, Portland Style. To help build viewership and a separate identity for KPDX, the station had a "street team" of promoters, who traveled the area in a logo-wrapped Scion car.

In January 2006, UPN and The WB agreed to merge to form The CW. Portland's WB affiliate, KWBP (channel 32), was part of a group of Tribune Broadcasting stations immediately announced as one of the network's new affiliates. The next month, Fox parent News Corporation announced the creation of its own secondary network, MyNetworkTV, to serve its outgoing UPN stations as well as those WB and UPN affiliates owned by others that had not been selected for The CW. KPDX agreed to affiliate with MyNetworkTV in March 2006.

KPDX logo under the "PDX 49", used from April 1, 2006, to September 7, 2008; this was the last logo used by the station to incorporate its channel number.

KPDX's logo for the "PDX TV" branding. A revised version was later adopted using a dark blue color scheme.

The station's main logo from 2018 until 2026 as Fox 12 Plus; still remaining in use in older promotional advertising and tuning guidance for KPTV-produced newscasts airing on KPDX.

In 2008, KPDX debuted an 8 p.m. prime time local newscast, followed by a 9 a.m. news hour in 2010 and a 9 p.m. newscast in 2014. During this time, local programming on the station included a wrestling show, Portland Wrestling Uncut, In 2018, KPDX was rebranded as Fox 12 Plus, an extension of KPTV, and the 8 and 9 p.m. newscasts were expanded to weekends. MyNetworkTV programming aired at midnight. In 2021, KPTV and KPDX, along with the rest of Meredith's stations, were acquired by Gray Television.

From 2011 to 2022, KPTV and KPDX shared local broadcast rights to the Portland Timbers of Major League Soccer (MLS). In 2022, the station aired 21 of the team's 34 matches. All MLS local television rights agreements ended after that season when Apple TV+ acquired global broadcast rights. In February 2025, KPDX aired matches from the Coachella Valley Invitational preseason tournament featuring the Timbers and Portland Thorns FC of the National Women's Soccer League. That season, the Thorns signed to air five regular-season matches on KPTV or KPDX.

== Rose City SportsNet ==
The Thorns and the Portland Fire, an expansion WNBA team also owned by RAJ Sports, signed a rights deal in February 2026 to make KPDX their regional TV broadcaster for all local Fire telecasts and more Thorns telecasts. As part of this partnership, Gray and RAJ rebranded KPDX on April 29—with the Fire's first preseason game—as Rose City SportsNet, an over-the-air regional sports network, with a focus on women's sports events and studio shows for the Fire.

== Technical information and subchannels ==
KPDX is one of Portland's two ATSC 3.0 (NextGen TV) stations, launching on July 29, 2020. Its subchannels are broadcast by KPTV and KGW from their transmitters:

Subchannels provided by KPDX (ATSC 1.0)
Subchannel	Res.	Short name	Programming	ATSC 1.0 host
49.1	720p	Fox12+	Main KPDX programming/Rose City SportsNet	KPTV
49.2	480i	Mystery	Ion Mystery	KGW
49.3	480i	Outlaw	Outlaw	KPTV
49.4	480i	CourtTV	Court TV	KGW

From its transmitter in the West Hills, KPDX broadcasts itself, KPTV, KGW, and Oregon Public Broadcasting in 3.0 format:

Subchannels of KPDX (ATSC 3.0)
Subchannel	Res.	Short name	Programming
8.1	720p	KGW	NBC (KGW)
10.1	720p	KOPB	PBS (KOPB-TV)
12.1	720p	KPTV	Fox (KPTV)
49.1	720p	KPDX	Main KPDX programming

Subchannel broadcast with digital rights management

KPDX began broadcasting a digital signal on channel 48 on November 2, 1999. Like all Portland stations, KPDX opted to bypass the original February date and shut down its analog signal, over UHF channel 49, on June 12, 2009, the official digital television transition date. Its digital signal moved to channel 30.

=== Translators ===
KPDX was previously broadcast on some of its own translators and later, in some cases, on digital translators that carried the main channels of KPTV and KPDX.

With the ATSC 3.0 transition, the KPDX subchannels moved to the KPTV and KGW multiplexes and were added to their dependent translator stations.
