= Vandervoort =

Vandervoort may refer to:

== Places ==
- Vandervoort, Arkansas, United States

== People ==
- Benjamin H. Vandervoort (1917–1990), an American soldier
- Laura Vandervoort, a Canadian actress
- Paul Vandervoort (1846-1902), American soldier who served in the Union Army

== See also ==
- Van der Voort, surname
