= Clark massacre =

Massacre

- Location: near the Raft River, Idaho
- Date: August 6, 1851
- Attack type: Robbery involving murder
- Deaths: 3 killed
- Perpetrator: Shoshoni

In August, 1851, a band of Shoshoni Indians led by Cho Cho Co (also called Has No Horse) reportedly attacked a wagon train led by Thomas Clark on the Oregon Trail near where the Raft River joins the Snake River in present-day Idaho. Afterward, reports held that the natives' primary objective was to steal horses from Thomas Clark's wagon train party, and that the indigenous tribe killed Clark's mother and brother and another man traveling with them during the horse robbery.

== Thomas Clark ==
Thomas Clark was an Englishman who loved hunting. He came overland to the Willamette Valley in Oregon in 1848, but soon decamped with Jackson Vandevert and others to the California Gold Rush. They decided to invest their gains in bringing high quality cattle and horses to Oregon. By the spring of 1851 Thomas had acquired 17 horses and a few cattle from Kentucky and Illinois. On the trail west he brought with him his mother, his 25-year-old sister Grace, his 17-year-old brother, Hodgson, another brother named Charlie, and another married sister with her family. He had a first class hack built for Grace to drive and his mother to ride in. It may have been the first such vehicle to cross the plains. He had also become the pilot for several other Illinois families headed to Oregon. The company moved slowly so the animals could graze and arrive in Oregon in good condition.

== Cho Cho Co ==
Cho Cho Co was only twenty years old in 1851 but was already a veteran guerilla fighter. He led a band of warriors of the Tussawehee sub-tribe of the Shoshone, the most powerful tribe in the area that would become Eastern Oregon, Idaho, and Western Montana. In this area, the Shoshone were often known by white people as the Snakes. By late August, the band was short of supplies, particularly good horses, guns, and ammunition. Cho Cho Co traveled east along the Oregon Trail to meet his uncle, Deer Fly, and borrow soldiers from him. Now reinforced, he identified the Clark party as his target.

== The attack ==
At about noon on Wednesday, August 6, the wagon train stopped to rest and eat lunch. As usual, Mrs. Clark, Grace, and Hodgson drove a mile ahead of the main train to a good stopping place and began to prepare the noon-day meal. They stopped by the Raft River and Thomas Clark headed up the river to hunt ducks. The Raft River is about 16 miles (26 km) west of the current Massacre Rocks State Park, an area where several wagon trains were attacked later in the 1850s. Other men brought many of the horses up to the river ahead of the rest of the wagon train.

The attackers' strategy was to have some of their number charge the main body of the wagon train at full gallop, creating the maximum amount of confusion. Meanwhile, Cho Cho Co and others would cut out the horses and drive them away.

As they saw the warriors approaching, the men with the company's horses took shelter behind some rocks by the river. Hodgson Clark was shot and killed instantly as he climbed up on a wagon wheel to get a gun from the wagon. An older Shoshoni man came to unhitch some horses that were tied to the wagon. When Mrs. Clark yelled at him, he started shooting at her. Grace put her arms around her mother to protect her, but a bullet went through Grace's wrist and continued through her mother's heart. She died that evening.

Grace was subsequently wounded below the armpit by a bullet that passed entirely through her body. The warriors tore off her clothes. She was stunned and pretended to be dead. Grace said they talked American and some of them were blue eyed. The warriors began to scalp her but stopped when they saw a cloud of dust coming. Thomas Clark had heard the shooting and rode back at full speed with his hunting hounds baying beside him. The warriors thought he was leading a large party, so they threw Grace down over the bluff and rolled stones down on her, leaving scars on her forehead that remained the rest of her life. Linwood Clark says her leg was "fractured".

The main body of the wagon train was too paralyzed by the fury of the attack to come to the assistance of the Clark family. Charles Clark, Thomas' brother, organized a party to pursue Cho Cho Co's band and caught up to them where they had taken refuge in a natural fortress. The band could not be dislodged and the pursuit was abandoned. The pursuing emigrants reported several men among the group with long sandy-colored beards. Cho Cho Co's band killed one man, wounded another, and escaped with the horses.

Linwood Clark reports that Mormons had offered to buy some of the horses earlier in the trip and that some of the stolen horses were later seen in Salt Lake City. Clark opines that the whites among the raiders may have been "ordinary outlaws who later sold the horses to the Mormons."

Americus Savage's account corroborates the above story, although Savage places the events on August 18 (this is likely an error in Savage's journal - it was more likely the 8th). According to Savage, a man (possibly Charles Clark) was sent to Savage's wagon train, which was about 4 days drive ahead of Clark's company. Savage recounts that:

"The man was trying to raise a company to pursue the Indians and get back the stock and horses. We had only two horses in our company and two men volunteered to go and were soon on the way. They raised fifteen volunteers from all the companies and by hard riding overtook the Indians at 12 o'clock the same day. ...before them on a hillside they could see the horses grazing quietly... They made a charge when close to the hill. The Indians sprang up from behind bush and rock, gave the warhoop and discharged their guns into the little band of volunteers, killing one horse, mortally wounding one man and lodging a bullet in one by the name of Powell, a man from our company. They saw the folly of further effort to recover their horses from the Indians in their chosen strong hold. They therefore retreated."

== Clark continues ==
Clark expected his sister to die and waited for a day or so before moving on.

The traditional story is that, rather than follow the usual route of the Oregon Trail northwest to join the Columbia River, Clark headed west until he could steer towards the mountains known as the Three Sisters in the Cascade Range. According to the story, the Clark company was the first group of whites to camp by the Deschutes River on the future site of Pioneer Park in Bend, Oregon. Menefee argues persuasively that Clark followed the usual Oregon trail in 1851 and the story has been confused with the 1853 trip of Thomas and Charles Clark when they crossed eastern Oregon south of the Blue Mountains with the "Lost Wagon Train" following the Elliott Cutoff. In either case it was Thomas Clark who gave a prominent extinct volcano within the city limits the name Pilot Butte. Menafee is supported by Thomas Clark's own letter in which he reports meeting his brother James on the 1851 trip about thirty miles east of The Dalles on the Columbia River.

Grace Clark married Thomas' partner, Jackson Vandevert, and settled in the Willamette Valley. Grace dedicated substantial efforts to the welfare of the local Native Americans. She died in 1875. The couple's first of seven children, William Plutarch Vandevert, born in 1854 in Cottage Grove, Oregon, established Vandevert Ranch south of Bend in 1892. Thomas, Charles, and James Clark moved to Petrolia, California in 1857 and raised cattle. All three brothers fought in the Rogue River Indian Wars of 1855-1856 in Southern Oregon. James Clark returned to Oregon where his ranch (afterwards called "Burnt Ranch") was burned by Indian marauders and where James, with Howard Maupin, tracked down Chief Paulina and killed him in 1867. Thomas died in Oxnard, California, 11 November 1903 at the age of 88 years.

== Notes ==
=== Sources ===
- Brogan, Phil, East of the Cascades, Binford & Mort Publishing, October 1976, ISBN 978-0-8323-0005-9
- Burgderfer, Don, The Clark Massacre Party of 1851, article in Little Known Tales of Oregon History Volume III, Sun Publishing, Bend, Oregon 2001, pp. 81–84
- Clark, Linwood LeBoeuf, Clark Family History, monograph written in 1980. Link to
- Clark, Thomas, Letter to Mr. T.A. Wood, Port Hueneme, California, August 7, 1902. Link to
- Clark, TK, Regional History of Petrolia and the Mattole Valley, Miller Press, Eugene, Oregon 1983, pp. 5–14
- Evans, Jane Coultas (member of the Clark party), diary written in 1904 and quoted at length in The Sunday Oregonian, February 14, 1965
- Jones, Randall S., Bend Resident Relates Stirring Story of Indian Raid on Pioneer Travelers, Oregon Historical Society SB#272 p. 61
- McNellis, Grace Vandevert (great-granddaughter of Grace Clark), interviewed on October 26, 2008
- Ontko, Gale, Thunder Over the Ochoco: The Gathering Storm, Volume I, Seven Locks Press, Santa Ana, CA, ISBN 0-9790950-4-2 pp. 5–17
- Power, Evada R., Old Days Revived in Stories Told by William Vandevert, of La Pine, The Redmond Spokesman, August 20, 1936
- Menefee, Leah Collins and Tiller, Lowell, Cutoff Fever, Oregon Historical Society Quarterly, Portland Oregon, December 1976, March, June, September, and December 1977. (See especially September 1977, pp. 215–219)
- Newsom, David, Letter to the Illinois Journal written December 15, 1851 in Salem, Oregon. Quoted in TK Clark (above)
- Bill Vandevert, Bear Hunter, Bend Oregon, in The Oregon Journal November 22–23, 1922.
- Vandevert, Claude (Grace Clark's grandson), Indian Meadows, unpublished transcript of monologue, 1971. Link to
