= William Vandevert =

American adventurer and cattleman

William Plutarch Vandevert (February 24, 1854 – February 26, 1944) was a western adventurer, cattleman, and Central Oregon pioneer. After travels in California, Texas, and Arizona, he established a cattle ranch fifteen miles (24 km) south of present-day Bend, Oregon, before the founding of Bend or the surrounding Deschutes County. He blazed trails through the Cascade Mountains and was a renowned bear hunter. He fathered eight children, including three doctors, and was a leading citizen of Central Oregon for many years.

== Early life ==
Vandevert was born in Cottage Grove in the Willamette Valley of Oregon Territory to Grace Clark Vandevert, born in England and survivor of the Clark Massacre of 1851 on the Oregon Trail. His father was Jackson Vandevert, partner of Thomas Clark, Grace's brother, in the California goldfields of 1849. Vandevert's ancestor, Michael Pauluzen Van der Voort, was an early settler of Dutch New Amsterdam, now New York City.

When he was 15, Vandevert's uncle, Thomas Clark, persuaded his mother to let William help him drive 29 horses to California. William broke his shoulder when he was thrown from his horse but continued on the trip. He returned with three horses of his own, a saddle, and $200 in gold.

Aged 17, while traveling to the Silver Lake-Summer Lake area of Oregon with a survey crew, William first saw the land that later became the Vandevert Ranch. It was a meadow on the Little Deschutes River, surrounded by pine forest, with a view of the Cascade Mountains, particularly Mount Bachelor.

In the 1870s he carried mail from Camp Warner in Oregon to Fort Bidwell in California, riding through the area of the Modoc War as it was in progress. He appeared in the San Francisco newspapers when, on one trip, he killed a much-feared "Silver Lake Grizzly" that the hunters who had cornered it were afraid to approach. Vandevert got so close to the bear that the powder from his gun singed the bear's hair.

In 1876 Vandevert left for Texas where he joined the large cattle-ranching Hash Knife Outfit. On his travels between Oregon and Texas he spent a season herding sheep for the Requa family in the hills above Oakland, California. During that time he met Joaquin Miller, Oakland's then-famous poet, and reported that Miller was the dirtiest man he'd ever met.

== Marriage and children ==
In 1878, Sadie Vinceheller, well-educated and fluent in French and Spanish, arrived in Fort Griffin, Texas to teach at a school. Alighting from the stagecoach, she knocked on the door of a nearby house hoping to borrow a lantern to light her way to her arranged lodgings. William Vandevert answered the door. The two were married in Jeffersontown, Kentucky, on 10 November 1880.

After the Hash Knife Outfit was acquired by the newly formed Aztec Land & Cattle Company in 1884, the couple moved with the company to Holbrook, Arizona. They experienced the decline of the company due to drought and overgrazing before leaving in about 1889. According to their granddaughter, Grace McNellis, the family never learned for sure why the couple left Arizona, but speculated that Sadie was homesick to see her sister in New York City, and tired of the chaos in Arizona during the time connected with the Pleasant Valley War. According to McNellis: "I'm sure Sadie, by then, with five children, needed to get away from that kind of atmosphere. She was raised a rather genteel lady in Kentucky and I'll bet she never dreamed of ending up like that in Arizona. She must have matured rather rapidly after marrying Grampa."

They couple left Arizona in 1889, had another child, Kathryn Grace, in New York on May 26, 1890, and left New York in 1891 when Sadie was pregnant with another son, Claude. They arrived at William's father's ranch in Powell Butte, Oregon, in approximately December 1891, and Claude was born in January 1892. They only lived in New York for one year, in Spring Valley, Rockland County.

William and Sadie had eight children:

- Mittye – born August 17, 1883, in Fort Worth, Texas. Died February 5, 1975, in Bend, Oregon.
- Thomas William (known as Bill) – born December 26, 1884, in Fort Griffen, Texas. Died February 28, 1969, in Bend, Oregon.
- Maude – born February 22, 1886, in Fort Worth, Texas. Died September 30, 1945, in Bend, Oregon.
- John Clinton (known as Clint) – Born January 13, 1887, in Holbrook, Arizona. Died March 14, 1967, in Bend, Oregon (Doctor in Bend.)
- George – born December 3, 1888, in Holbrook, Arizona. Died November 1972 in Grants Pass, Oregon (Doctor in Bend until 1928 and then in Oakland, California)
- Kathryn Grace – born May 26, 1890, in Spring Valley, Rockland County, New York. Died of influenza on November 4, 1918, on Vandevert Ranch near Bend, Oregon.
- Claude Chandler – born January 6, 1892, in Powell Butte, Oregon. Died December 5, 1975, in Bend, Oregon.
- Arthur (known as Bush) – Born November 27, 1894, in Bend, Oregon. Died June 16, 1972, in Sellersburg, Indiana.(Doctor in Kentucky.)

== Vandevert Ranch ==
While the couple were in New York, William's brother Charlie wrote to him to say he had bought the land on the Little Deschutes River in Oregon that William had always admired. Charlie was holding the property to sell to William, who bought the land for $600 and established the ranch in 1892, building a log homestead, raising his family, and raising cattle. Bill bought from Charlie the eastern 160 acres (0.65 km^{2}) of the ranch that had been homesteaded by a man named Scoggins. Vandevert himself homesteaded the western 160 acres (0.65 km^{2}) of what came to be known as Vandevert Ranch.

The ranch was at times a post office and a stagecoach stop. William's son Claude said that, "... my mother was from Kentucky and a Democrat and she got the post office – we had it right here at home." The post office was established in 1893 and was named after John G. Carlisle, also from Kentucky, who was Grover Cleveland's Secretary of the Treasury. A visitor in 1898 wrote the area had a "real backwoods" appearance but noted the Vandeverts "had sent their daughter to school in the east." This was the oldest daughter, Mittye, who had stayed in the east with relatives. "They had a little store and a blacksmith shop but were stock raisers for the most part."

The first settler to know the surrounding area well, Vandevert added to his income by guiding hunting trips for bear. He once guided the two sons of E.H. Harriman, the famous railroad builder. The family added further to its income by trapping otter, beaver, and mink. Vandevert was a proficient sheep shearer and could do a hundred sheep a day at ten cents a head.

In 1898 and 1899 Bill worked for the Department of the Interior as the first forest ranger in Central Oregon. He would take a pack string into the mountains from Sisters to North Umpqua and send in reports. He would be gone two weeks, rest a week or so, and go back out again. He blazed a large number of trails.

In Holbrook, Arizona, Vandevert had become acquainted with Alexander M. Drake. When Drake came to build irrigation canals and develop the city of Bend in the early 1900s, Vandevert helped give him the lay of the land. Vandevert was an active member of the Bend Commercial Club, the Masons, and the Pioneer Association.

Even in the isolated environment of the ranch, Sadie ensured that her children were well-educated. Three of them became doctors, including Clint Vandevert, a leading and respected doctor in Bend for many years. Due to problems in the small local school, some of the older children started staying at the Drakes' in 1903 and going to school in Bend. Vandevert helped build a new school in Bend in 1904. In 1929 the one-room Harper School was moved to the ranch and operated there until the 1950s.

A quarrelsome family settled near the ranch and some cattle were stolen. The mother died mysteriously and the father disappeared. After much persuasion, Vandevert assisted in the search. The father's body was found buried under a smoldering fire. He had been shot in the back of his head and the bullet lodged against his temple. A member of the search party gave the opinion that the man had been shot with a .45 pistol. Vandevert had the only .45 pistol in the area and insisted that the bullet be dug out. Lacking surgeon's tools the local doctor tried sawing through the skull but gave up, leaving Vandevert to finish the job. The sheriff used a table fork to extract the bullet. It was a .32 bullet. The man's son was indicted but found not guilty. Facts uncovered later confirmed the verdict.

Vandevert took his entire family to the Lewis and Clark Centennial Exposition of 1905 in Portland. The family traveled by wagon over the Santiam Pass, stocked up on fruit and vegetables not available in Central Oregon, and came back via a river barge to The Dalles.

Well into the 1930s Native Americans would visit the ranch every fall to hunt deer. They set up teepees and a sweathouse near the river. When they visited the homestead, Vandevert conversed with them in their own language.

In the 1940s Vandevert Ranch neighbored Camp Abbot. During World War II the camp trained 10,000 combat engineers. Grace McNellis recounted a story about the soldiers that were participating in the Oregon Maneuver. The soldiers were practicing maneuvers in the fields surrounding the ranch. Grace's father, Claude, approached the soldiers while they were cooking food. The soldiers said that they would make sure to clean up the area and they would dispose of the food by burying it. The soldiers told him that next platoon of soldiers that came through would want fresh food so they could not reuse the food. Rather than it being buried, Claude struck a deal with the soldiers. Claude purchased some pigs and had the soldiers bring him all the excess food that would have been buried and wasted. In return, Claude allowed the soldiers to pick up the extra hay in the field for use in their sleeping bags.

Sadie died in 1924 and William lived on the ranch until two days after his ninetieth birthday in 1944. Ownership and management of the ranch passed to his two sons, Thomas William and Claude Chandler, who finally sold the ranch in 1970. One hundred years after the original founding of the ranch, the land, with an additional 80 acres (320,000 m^{2}), became a 22-lot luxury gated community still known as Vandevert Ranch. The original log homestead was rebuilt and the schoolhouse was completely renovated.
