= Channel 21 virtual TV stations in the United States =

The following television stations operate on virtual channel 21 in the United States:

This table is sorted ascending by call sign; click on any of the arrows to change how the table is sorted.

Call sign	City	State
K13KH-D	Townsend	Montana
K13OQ-D	Big Sandy	Montana
K15GT-D	Hibbing	Minnesota
K15KG-D	Eads, etc.	Colorado
K16GM-D	Yerington	Nevada
K16KB-D	Conrad	Montana
K17FR-D	Walker Lake	Nevada
K17HB-D	Winnemucca	Nevada
K19MK-D	Lake Tahoe	Nevada
K20NR-D	International Falls	Minnesota
K21AC-D	Victorville, etc.	California
K21DO-D	Palm Springs	California
K21GE-D	Camp Verde	Arizona
K21GI-D	Morongo Valley	California
K21GN-D	Alexandria	Minnesota
K21GQ-D	Minot	North Dakota
K21GU-D	Midland	Texas
K21HX-D	Walker	Minnesota
K21JQ-D	Walla Walla	Washington
K21KY-D	Bigfork/Marcell	Minnesota
K21LB-D	Lincoln City	Oregon
K21LC-D	Cortez	Colorado
K21LI-D	Idaho Falls	Idaho
K21MO-D	Riverside	California
K21MP-D	Lawton	Oklahoma
K21OY-D	Chico	California
K21PD-D	Columbia	Missouri
K21PI-D	Monterey	California
K22AD-D	Gillette	Wyoming
K22IL-D	Prineville, etc.	Oregon
K22MO-D	Pateros	Washington
K22MR-D	Virginia	Minnesota
K23PN-D	La Pine	Oregon
K24NB-D	Elko	Nevada
K26NP-D	Overton	Nevada
K27NE-D	Susanville, etc.	California
K27OI-D	Mina/Luning	Nevada
K28GE-D	Woodland Park	Colorado
K28LM-D	Eureka	Nevada
K28QR-D	La Pine	Oregon
K29EB-D	Grand Rapids	Minnesota
K30HY-D	Verdi/Mogul	Nevada
K31GH-D	Hayward	Wisconsin
K32GW-D	Carson City	Nevada
K32KP-D	Black Butte Ranch	Oregon
K32MD-D	Cheyenne Wells	Colorado
K33OG-D	Max	Minnesota
K34BL-D	Lovelock	Nevada
K34QQ-D	Tahoe City	California
K35AX-D	Hawthorne	Nevada
K35FL-D	Silver Springs	Nevada
K35MW-D	Lead	South Dakota
K35OF-D	Joplin	Montana
K35OU-D	Tucson	Arizona
K36QD-D	Omaha	Nebraska
KAJF-LD	Kansas City	Missouri
KCWT-CD	La Feria	Texas
KDCK	Dodge City	Kansas
KFTV-DT	Hanford	California
KGCS-LD	Joplin	Missouri
KHBB-LD	Helena	Montana
KHSV	Las Vegas	Nevada
KJWY-LD	Salem	Oregon
KKSU-LD	Manhattan	Kansas
KLEI	Wailuku	Hawaii
KMLF-LD	Grand Island	Nebraska
KNBN	Rapid City	South Dakota
KNPG-LD	Saint Joseph	Missouri
KNSN-TV	Reno	Nevada
KOZK	Springfield	Missouri
KPAZ-TV	Phoenix	Arizona
KPXJ	Minden	Louisiana
KQDS-TV	Duluth	Minnesota
KQKT-LD	Tyler	Texas
KRVU-LD	Redding	California
KRWB-TV	Roswell	New Mexico
KTIN	Fort Dodge	Iowa
KTVZ	Bend	Oregon
KTXA	Fort Worth	Texas
KUGF-TV	Great Falls	Montana
KUNU-LD	Victoria	Texas
KUOT-CD	Oklahoma City	Oklahoma
KVQT-LD	Houston	Texas
KXAB-LD	Abilene	Texas
KXRM-TV	Colorado Springs	Colorado
KYNM-CD	Albuquerque	New Mexico
KZGN-LD	Ridgecrest	California
W15CW-D	Franklin	North Carolina
W15EB-D	Charlotte	North Carolina
W15EE-D	Ashland	Wisconsin
W21AU-D	Orlando	Florida
W21DV-D	Bryson City	North Carolina
W21EK-D	Key West	Florida
W21EL-D	Valdosta	Georgia
W21EO-D	Orono	Maine
W23EZ-D	Sylva	North Carolina
W24ER-D	Clarksburg	West Virginia
W26EM-D	Athens	Georgia
W26FB-D	Canton/Waynesville	North Carolina
W28DQ-D	Windsor	Vermont
W32CV-D	Ironwood	Michigan
W34DX-D	West Asheville	North Carolina
WARZ-LD	Smithfield	North Carolina
WAUT-LD	Auburn	Alabama
WBNA	Louisville	Kentucky
WBRL-CD	Baton Rouge	Louisiana
WCMW	Manistee	Michigan
WEAE-LD	Springfield	Illinois
WECP-LD	Panama City	Florida
WFMJ-TV	Youngstown	Ohio
WHA-TV	Madison	Wisconsin
WHNS	Greenville	South Carolina
WHP-TV	Harrisburg	Pennsylvania
WHWD-LD	Winston-Salem	North Carolina
WKMU	Murray	Kentucky
WKSY-LD	Rome	Georgia
WLIW	Garden City	New York
WLVO-LD	Cumming	Georgia
WMKE-CD	Milwaukee	Wisconsin
WMPV-TV	Mobile	Alabama
WOCW-LD	Charleston	West Virginia
WOOK-LD	Meridian	Mississippi
WPTA	Fort Wayne	Indiana
WPXC-TV	Brunswick	Georgia
WPXG-TV	Concord	New Hampshire
WSWY-LD	Indianapolis	Indiana
WTCE-TV	Fort Pierce	Florida
WTMH-LD	Macon	Georgia
WTPC-TV	Virginia Beach	Virginia
WTTO	Homewood	Alabama
WUMN-LD	Minneapolis	Minnesota
WWCW	Lynchburg	Virginia
WWMB	Florence	South Carolina
WXXI-TV	Rochester	New York
WZVI	Charlotte Amalie	U.S. Virgin Islands

The following stations, which are no longer licensed, formerly operated on virtual channel 21:

- K19LX-D in Granite Falls, Minnesota
- K21KD-D in Wyola, Montana
- K21MC-D in Hobbs, New Mexico
- K21PC-D in Geronimo, Oklahoma
- K23LK-D in Modesto, California
- K28LN-D in Orr, Minnesota
- K31KI-D in Round Mountain, Nevada
- KDKW-LD in Lubbock, Texas
- KDUG-LD in Hemet, California
- KMIK-LD in Cedar Falls, Iowa
- KRPO-LD in Quartzsite, Arizona
- W21DA-D in Dublin, Georgia
- W21DD-D in Naguabo, Puerto Rico
- WDRF-LD in Augusta, Georgia
- WWEA-LD in Wausau, Wisconsin
