= Dos Vort =

Yiddish-language daily newspaper

- June 28, 1940 issue of Dos Vort
- Type: Daily newspaper
- Political alignment: Labour Zionism
- Language: Yiddish
- Headquarters: Kaunas
- Country: Lithuania

Dos Vort (Yiddish: דאס וואָרט, 'The Word') was a Yiddish-language daily newspaper published from Kaunas, Lithuania. Dos Vort was an organ of the Labour Zionist Poalei Zion Right. It was first published in 1934.

The National Library of Israel has 1,684 scanned and searchable issues of the newspaper from 1934 to 1940 available to read online in its Historical Jewish Press collection.
