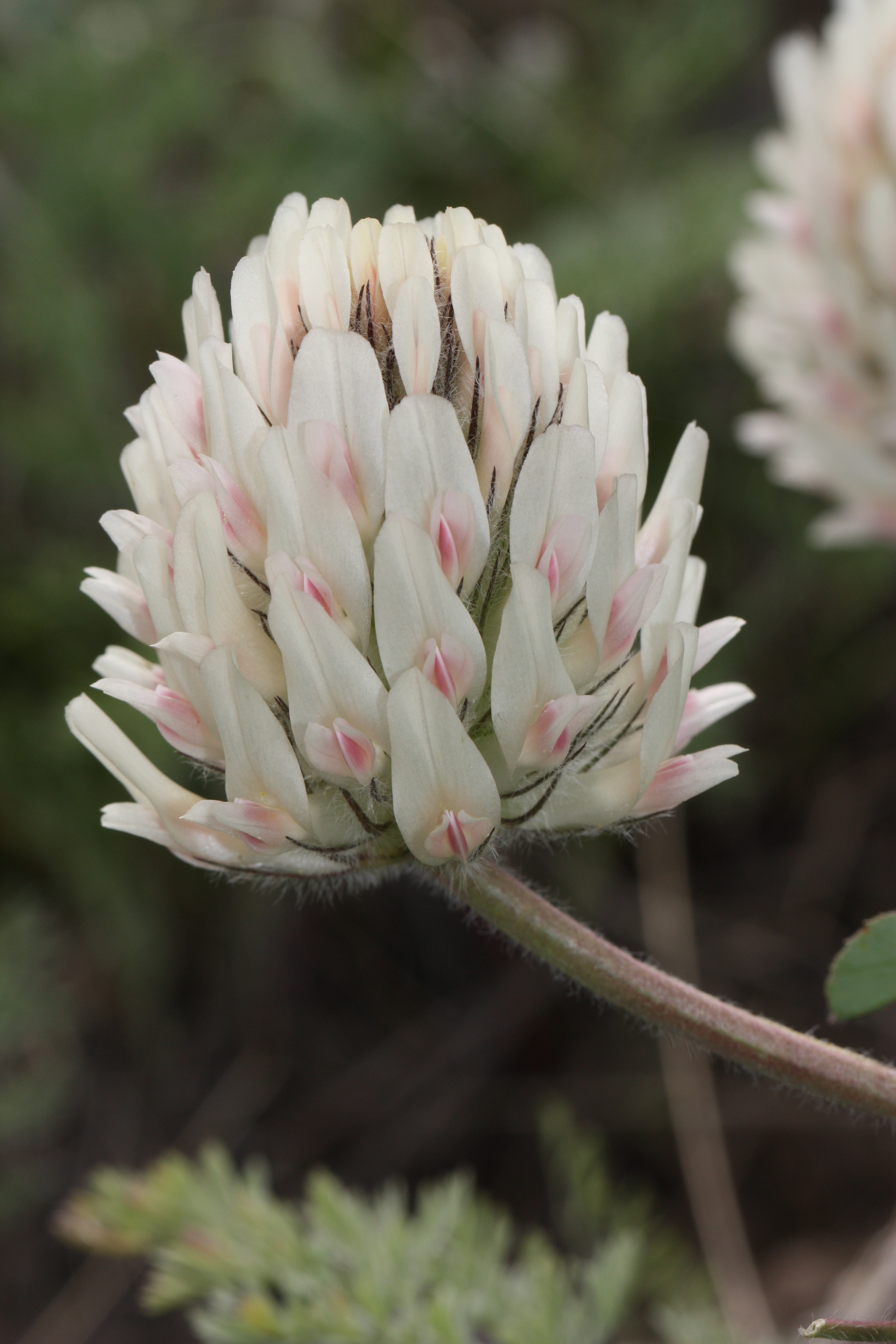
- Inflorescence

Scientific classification
- Kingdom: Plantae
- Clade: Tracheophytes
- Clade: Angiosperms
- Clade: Eudicots
- Clade: Rosids
- Order: Fabales
- Family: Fabaceae
- Subfamily: Faboideae
- Genus: Trifolium
- Species: T. macrocephalum

Binomial name
- Trifolium macrocephalum (Pursh) Poir.

= Trifolium macrocephalum =

Species of legume

Trifolium macrocephalum is a species of clover known by the common name largehead clover or bighead clover native to the Great Basin region of the western United States.

== Description ==
Trifolium macrocephalum is a rhizomatous perennial herb taking an upright form. The herbage is hairy. The leaves are made up of, theoretically 3, but usually from 5 to 9 thick oval leaflets. These are each up to 2.5 centimeters (1 in) long and have short teeth at their margins and often a pale transverse mark.

The inflorescence is crowded, egg-shaped and up to 5 or 6 cm (2 or 2 1/4 in) long. Each flower has a calyx of sepals with lobes narrowing into bristles which are coated in long woolly hairs. The flower corolla may be nearly 3 cm in length and is pink to lavender in color, or sometimes bicolored. It blooms early in spring. As both the Latin and common names suggest, the flower head is unusually large for a clover.

== Distribution and habitat ==
Trifolium macrocephalum is native to the Great Basin region of the western United States, from Washington to northern California, and Nevada to Idaho. It occurs in several types of habitat, including sagebrush scrub, juniper woodland, yellow pine forest, and mountain woodlands. It prefers thin-soiled, rocky areas.

== Gallery ==
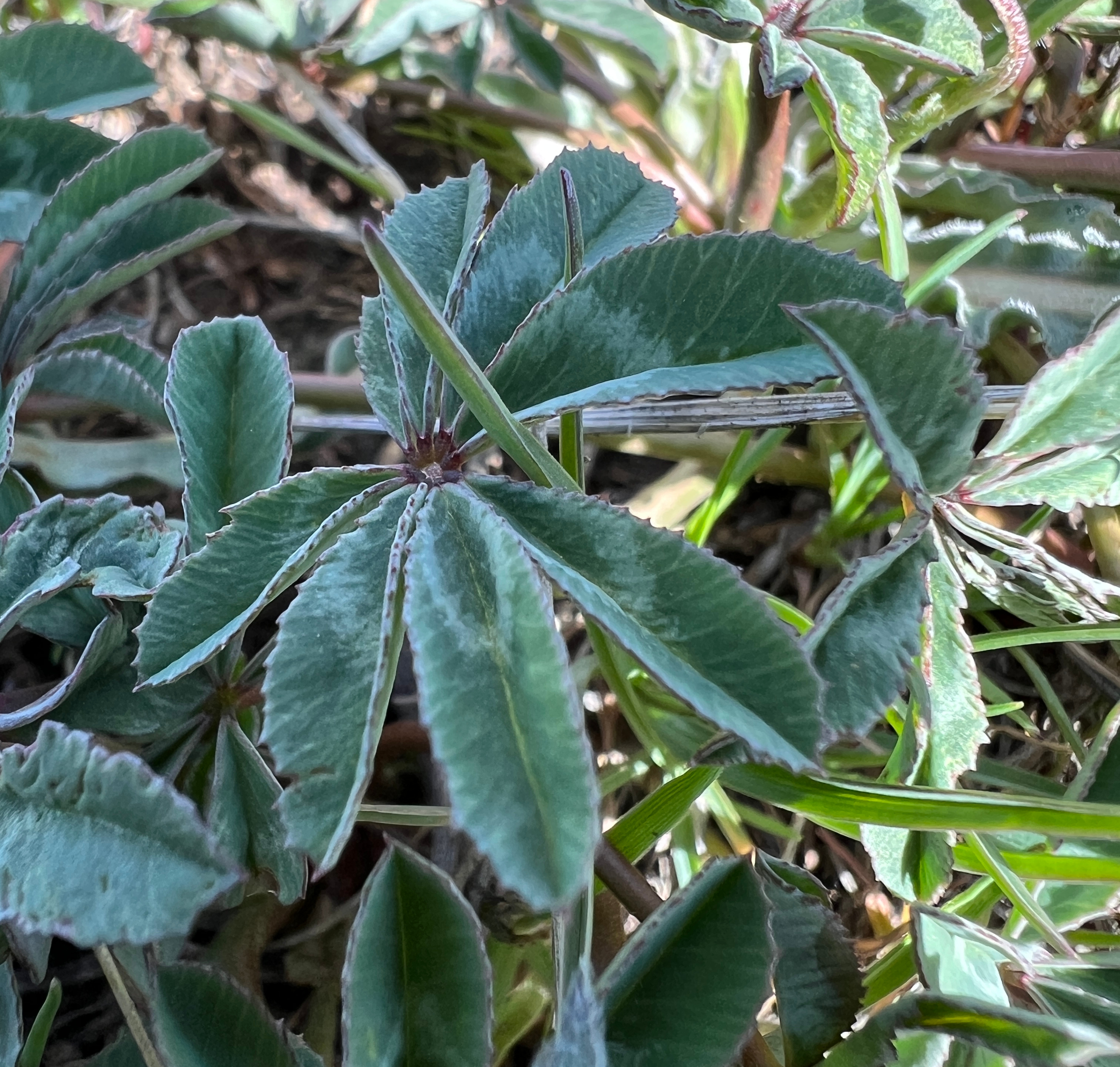
Leaves

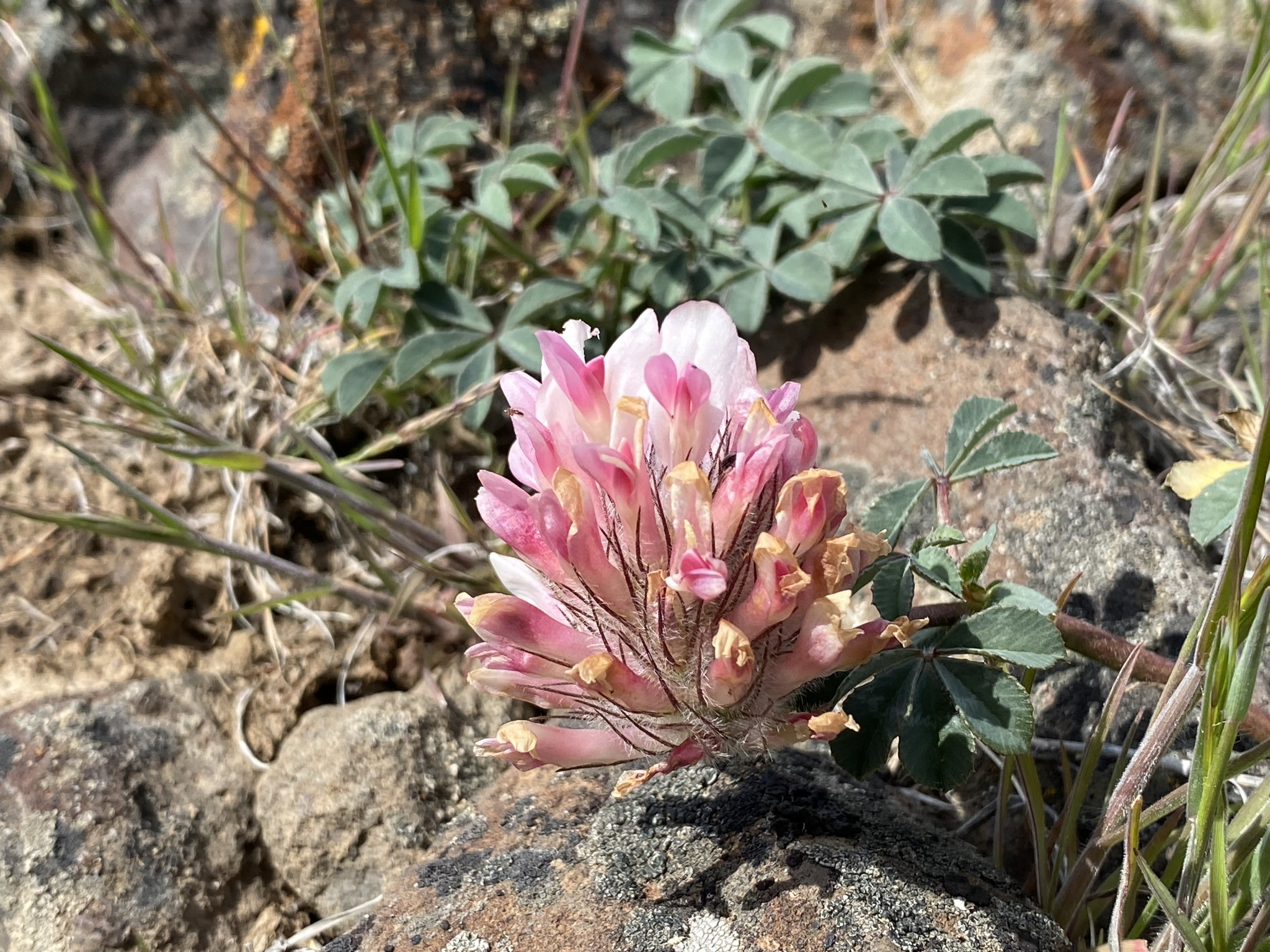
Large flower head
