= Herman Jacob van der Voort in de Betouw =

Dutch artist of the 19th century

Herman Jacob van der Voort in de Betouw (December 3, 1847, in Amsterdam – July 28, 1902, in Muralto, Switzerland) was a Dutch portrait, genre, and landscape painter. He studied at the Royal Academy of Fine Arts in Amsterdam (Koninklijke Academie van Beeldende Kunsten) from 1868 to 1873. During this time, he participated in group exhibitions in 1868, 1875, 1877, and 1888, showcasing his work alongside artists such as Johannes Hermanus Barend Koekkoek, Hendrik Willem Mesdag, and Johan Hendrik Weissenbruch.

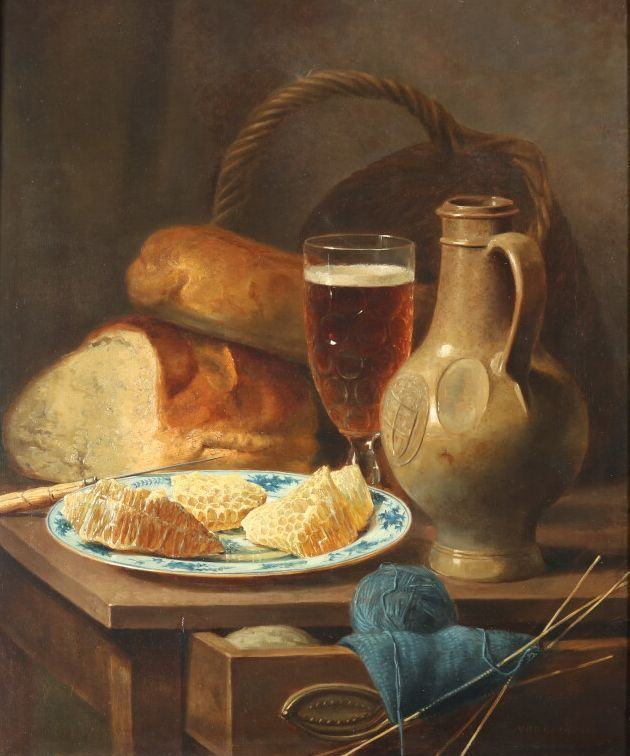
Herman Jacob van der Voort in de Betouw: Still Life (1874)

Initially, Herman Jacob van der Voort in de Betouw focused on classical genre motifs, portraits, and urban scenes in the traditional style of the Amsterdam Academy. Between 1874 and 1881, he shared a studio in Arnhem with his wife, Maria van der Voort in de Betouw-Nourney (1856–1923), who gained recognition beyond the Netherlands as a painter of still lifes. After the couple moved to Muralto, Switzerland, van der Voort in de Betouw turned his attention to landscape painting, incorporating influences from the realism of the Hague School and impressionism into his works.

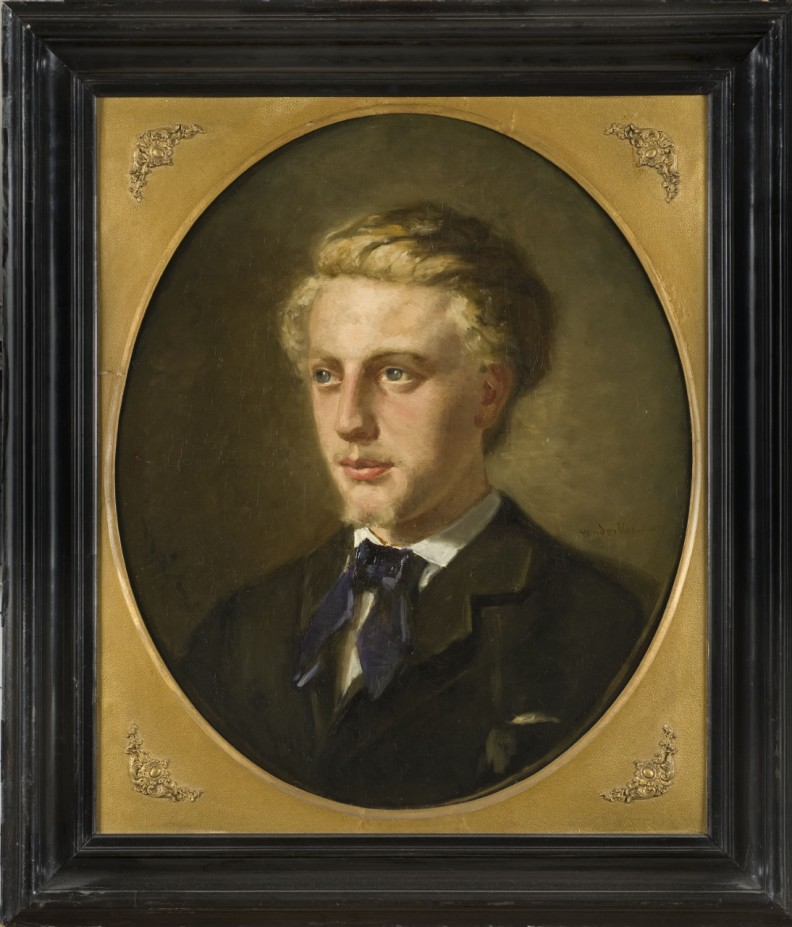
Herman Jacob van der Voort in de Betouw: Portrait of Jacques Perk (1879)

== Life and work ==
Herman Jacob van der Voort in de Betouw came from a Flemish noble family. His father, Herman Jacobus van der Voort in de Betouw, was a successful businessman in Amsterdam, while his mother's family, Jeanne Marie Louise Hugues, had its origins in France. As a member of the influential society Arti et Amicitiae, Herman Jacob van der Voort in de Betouw remained a recognized artist in Amsterdam well into the late 19th century. His early creative period included portraits, genre scenes, and allegorical still lifes. Van der Voort in de Betouw created the only known portrait of the Dutch poet Jaques Perk.

After relocating to Arnhem, he married Maria Nourney (1856–1923), a painter from Cologne. Following the couple's move to Muralto, a gathering place for European artists and intellectuals at the end of the 19th century, van der Voort devoted himself almost exclusively to landscape painting, incorporating impressionist techniques into his work.

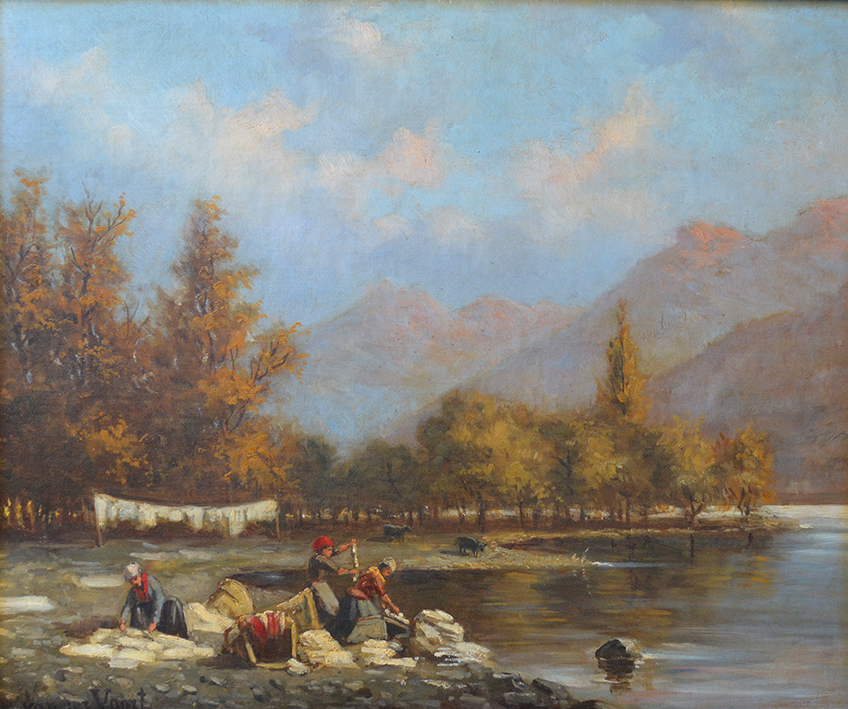
Herman Jacob van der Voort in de Betouw: Washerwomen at Lake Garda (circa 1890)
