= Michael Pauluzen Van der Voort =

Michael (or Michiel) Pauluzen Van der Voort (c. 1615 – c. 1690/1692) was an early resident of New Amsterdam and an early settler of Talbot County, Maryland. In New Amsterdam, in 1640, he married Marretje Maria Rapelje, whose older sister, Sarah, was the first European born in the New Netherland colony. His enterprises included real estate, shipping, tavern keeping and, in Maryland, planting tobacco. He is the ancestor of many in the United States who spell their name Vandervoort, Vanderford, Vandeford, Vandiver, Vandevert, Vandaveer or similarly.

== Origins ==
Michiel/Michael was born about 1615 in Dendermonde, Flanders, in what is now Belgium. Historian C.G. Ledley believes his ancestry traces back to Artus van der Voort, who lived near Turnhout, North Brabant. Various records suggest that Van der Voorts were well-to-do burghers in Amsterdam and Ghent. Ledley says both the name "Voort" comes from the small River Voort near Turnout and that "voort" literally means "ford".

== New Netherland and marriage ==
There is no definitive record of Michael's presence in New Netherland until his marriage, on November 18, 1640, under the auspices of the New Amsterdam Dutch Church. The marriage was among the first seven to be recorded in New Amsterdam, founded in 1625. Michael married Maretje Maria Rapelje, a daughter of two of the earliest settlers on New Netherland, Joris Jansen Rapelje and Catalina Trico. Maretje was born May 16, 1626, and was only 13 yrs., 11 months old when she married Michael. Joris and Catalina were Huguenots. Some sources report that both were born in what is now France, others that Joris was born in Leyden, Holland.

Unlike the Plymouth Colony in Massachusetts, founded by Puritans escaping religious persecution, New Netherland was founded by the Dutch West India Company seeking profits. The area was good for farming and was the best location in North America for trading with the Indians and with Europe. One result of this unique founding was that the colony welcomed settlers of all religious persuasions from all over the world. Another effect was the predominance of the commercial spirit, which led settlers to participate in multiple businesses at the same time. A third effect was the keeping of thorough records, particularly having to do with property.

On May 6, 1623, Abraham Rycker won a suit against Michael for the overdue first payment on land sold to him. At one time Michael owned several lots on Pearl Street (which still exists in downtown Manhattan) and built a house on one of the lots.

Michael and Maretje probably moved to the Wallabout Bay area of Brooklyn in about 1647, following Joris Rapelje who had bought land there in the 1630s. At some point Michael expanded into the shipping business. In 1653 Maretje demanded payment of the money Michael had earned with his sloop in fetching palisades for the city. Undoubtedly these palisades were requisitioned by Peter Stuyvesant to augment the wall built in 1653 to repel a possible attack by the English. Wall Street, a rough track at the time, was named after this wall.

In 1655 Michael was granted a license to sell wine and beer by the "small measure" on the condition that he also lodge strangers. The records refer to Michael as an "Old Burgher", indicating that he had reached a certain prominence in the local community. The last reference to Michael in New Netherland was in a suit he brought in 1659 against Hendrick Pieterson.

== Michael Pauluz or Pauluszen ==
Michael van der Voort may be the same person as an officer of the West India Company named in the records as Michael Pauluz or Pauluszen. Pauluz was superintendent of the Dutch colony of Pavonia (across the Hudson River from New Amsterdam) in the 1630s. If Van der Voort was the same man, he would likely have been born well before 1615 and have lived over eighty years when he died in about 1690.

== Maryland ==
Michael's first appearance in Maryland records was on March 16, 1661, when 300 acres (1.2 km^{2}) were "laid out" for him at the head of Corsey's Creek in Talbot County. Ledley says this part of Talbot County later became part of Queen Anne's County. Today, Corsey Creek is in Dorchester County. Ledley says, "No doubt Michael removed to Maryland to grow tobacco, as the New Netherland government had previously encouraged its people to settle there and supply the product and Michael had a brother-in-law interested in the tobacco trade."

Michael acquired more land from the Maryland colony by inducing others to come inhabit the area alongside him. It is a testimony to his reputation that he was influential enough to accomplish this. It is unknown whether the new settlers came from the New Netherland colony or directly from Europe. In the records of this English colony, Michael's name was first anglicized to Vandefort, Vandeford, and ultimately Vanderford. Michael came to own 1,300 acres (5.3 km^{2}) in the area before selling 350 acres (1.4 km^{2}) "called Vanderford" to Robert Smith in 1681.

Michael made his will on November 30, 1690, and probably died in 1692. His will was probated on September 20, 1692.

== Children and descendants ==
Michael and Maretje had nine children, not all of whom survived to adulthood or had children. Paulus Michaelis van der Voort was the couple's eldest surviving son and was baptized January 3, 1649, in the Dutch Church of New Amsterdam. He probably moved to Maryland with his parents before returning to the Bedford section of Brooklyn where he died in 1681 and where his descendants lived for several generations. Among his descendants is William Plutarch Vandevert, pioneer of Central Oregon and founder of the historical Vandevert Ranch.
