= Gray Butte =

Volcanic geological formation in Oregon

- Location within Oregon

Highest point
- Elevation: 5,108
- Coordinates: 44°25′00″N 121°06′04″W

Geography
- Location: Jefferson, Oregon, U.S.
- Topo map: USGS Gray Butte

Gray Butte is a volcanic butte in the southeast corner of Jefferson County, Oregon, United States. It is composed of welded tuff and is a part of the Crooked River caldera. A recreation trail for hiking, horseback riding, and mountain biking leads up the side of the butte. The butte is located near the popular tourist site of Smith Rock.
