= Crooked River caldera =

Volcano in Oregon, USA

- Location within Oregon

Highest point
- Coordinates: 44°18′N 120°54′W

Geography
- Location: Deschutes, Crook, and Jefferson counties, Oregon, U.S.
- Parent range: Ochoco Mountains

Geology
- Rock age: 29.5 Ma
- Mountain type(s): Caldera, supervolcano
- Last eruption: 29.5 million years ago

The Crooked River caldera is a large ancient volcano and vent complex that straddles three central Oregon counties. The diameter of the caldera is about 41 by 27 kilometres (25 mi × 17 mi). It is notable for the welded tuff present at Gray Butte, Smith Rock, Powell Buttes, Grizzly Mountain and Barnes Butte. The volcano is considered extinct and last erupted about 29.5 Ma.
