= Barnes Butte =

Dome of volcanic rock in Crook County, Oregon, United States

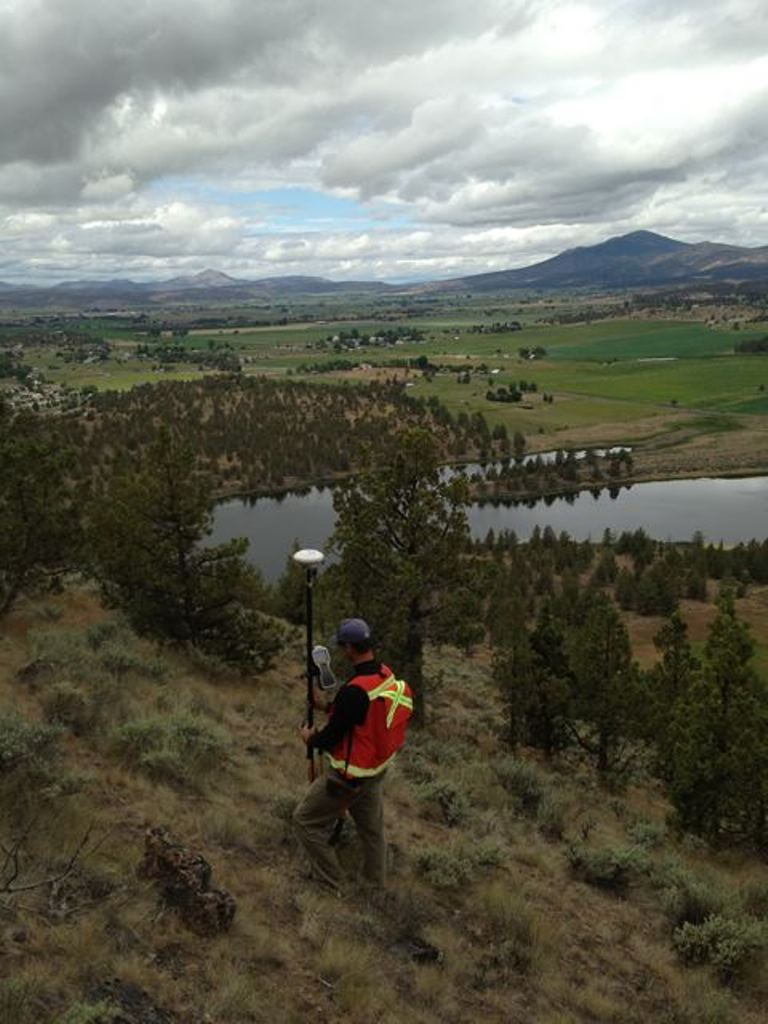
- The north slope of Barnes Butte with Barnes Butte Reservoir below.

Highest point
- Elevation: 3,549 ft (1,082 m)
- Coordinates: 44°19′07″N 120°48′38″W

Geography
- Location: Crook County, Oregon, U.S.

Geology
- Rock age: ~27.5 Ma

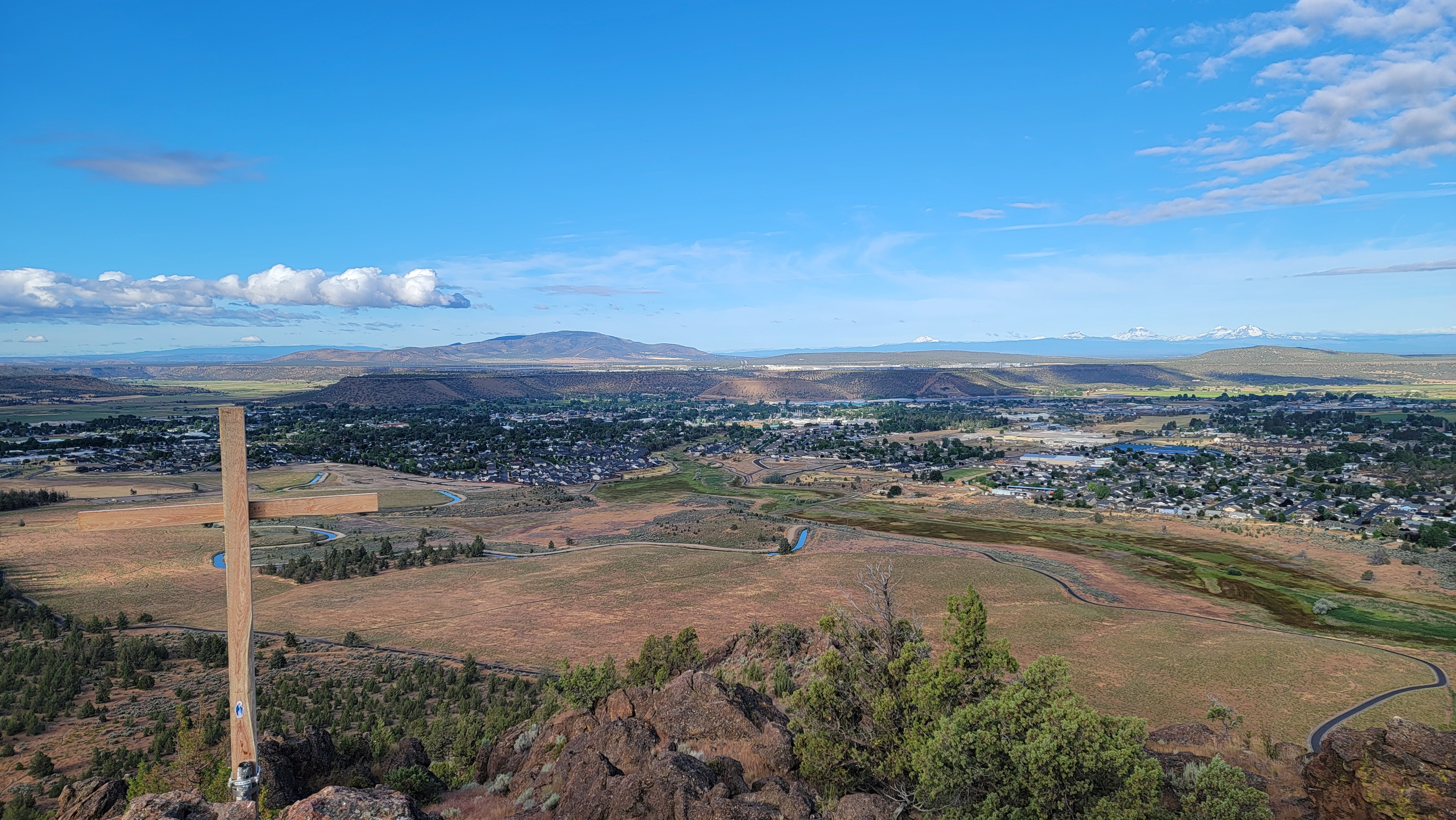
View from the top of Barnes Butte facing West towards Prineville

Barnes Butte is a rhyolite dome of volcanic rock in Crook County, Oregon, United States located partly within the city of Prineville. Barnes Butte is composed of welded tuff and is a part of the Crooked River caldera. It was the site of a 1940s mercury mine. In 2015, a BLM cleanup of mercury was done to reduce the health risk to residents of nearby IronHorse neighborhood and the Barnes Butte Elementary School.

The butte is a recreational area and includes the Barnes Butte hiking trail, a 4-mile (6.4 km) loop that includes a 2.6-mile (4.2 km) hike to the summit.

A concept plan, "Echo of the Butte," was developed by the Barnes Butte Focus Committee to establish a visitor center, amphitheater, and pond around the Happy Hour Plateau. Further development will be conducted on the trails with redeveloped paved paths and a boardwalk on BLM land. Included in the plan is nature rehabilitation, a bat adit along the trail towards the butte, and rest areas. As a part of resolution no. 1472, the Prineville City Council joined by mayor Rodney J. Beebe adopted the concept plan January 26, 2021.

The butte is considered one of three popular landmarks near Prineville and has been set aside for scenic preservation.
