= Powell Buttes =

Mountains located in Crook County, Oregon, United States

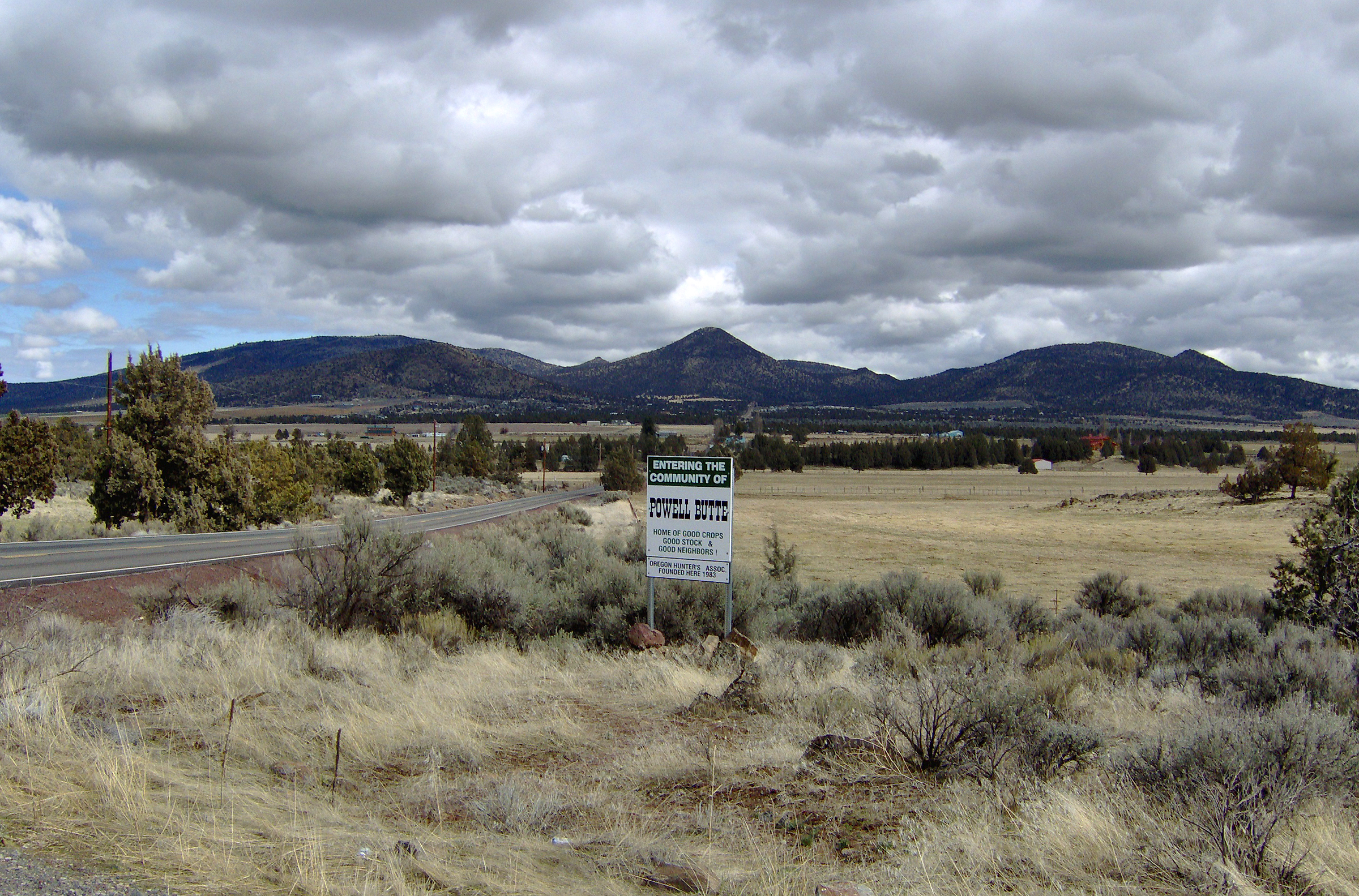
- Powell Buttes seen from the west

Highest point
- Elevation: 5,216 ft (1,590 m)
- Coordinates: 44°10′47″N 120°59′56″W

Geography
- Location within Oregon
- Location: Crook County, Oregon
- Topo map(s): USGS Powell Buttes, Oregon

Geology
- Rock age: Eocene
- Mountain type: Volcanic Rhyolite

The Powell Buttes are mountains with several summits located in Crook County, Oregon, United States. The highest summit is over 5,200 feet (1,600 m). The mountains are geologically related to the Ochoco Mountains and are named after members of Joseph Powell's family.

== Geology ==
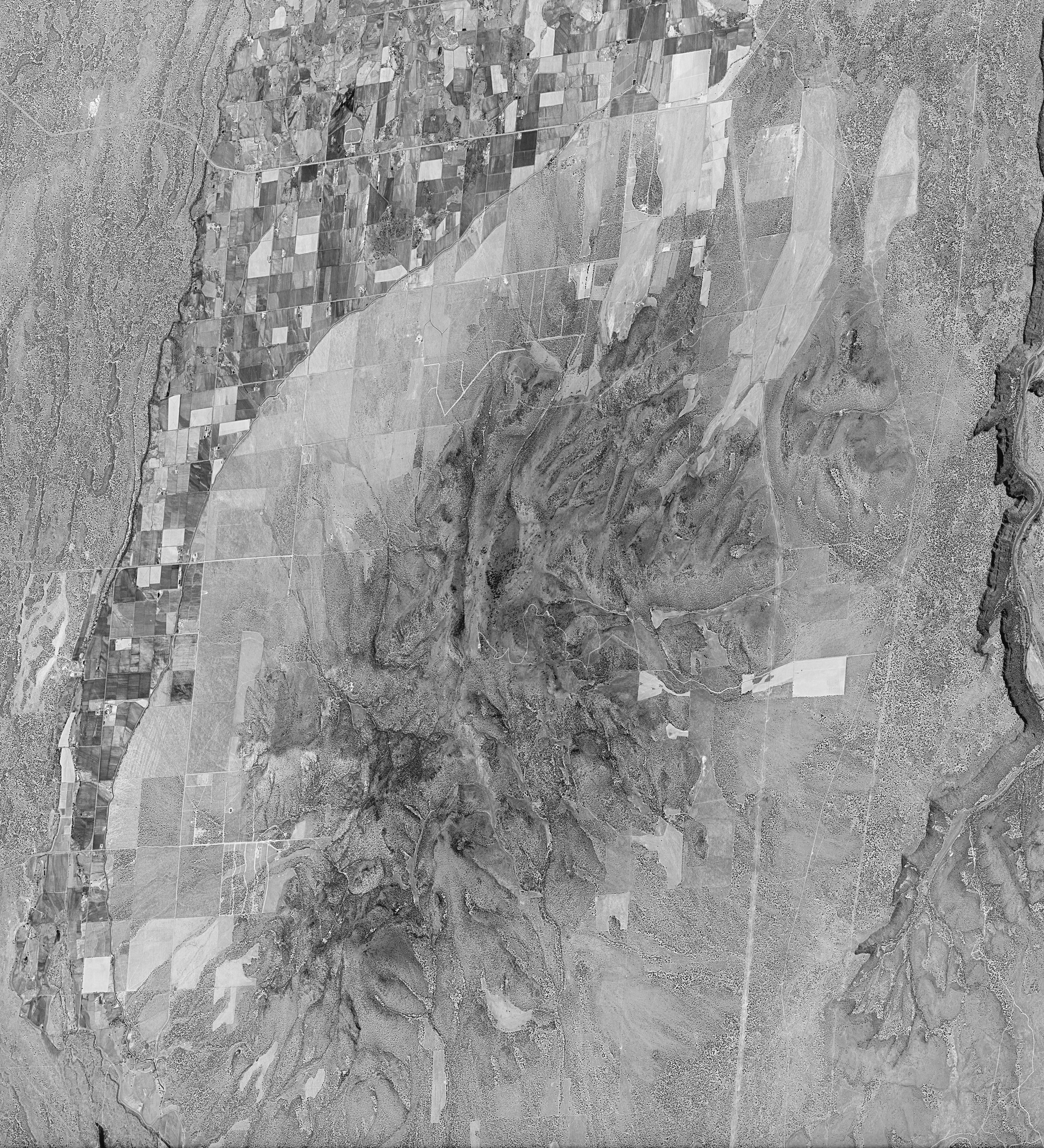
Powell Buttes viewed from space in 1973

The Powell Buttes are five rhyolitic buttes in western Crook County in Central Oregon. One of the buttes is considerably larger than the rest. Hat Rock is one of the named summits. In addition to the rhyolite, tuff and diatomite also comprise the buttes. Welded tuff has been found, showing it once comprised the Crooked River caldera.

The buttes are morphologically related to the Ochoco Mountains. Low grade uranium was found in very small amounts along the western side of one of the smaller buttes.

== Environment and ecology ==
In the summer, the environment around the Powell Buttes is dry and warm during the day and cool at night. In the winter, the weather is cold with snow occurring from October through April.

Western juniper is the dominant tree species on the mountain. Big sagebrush, gray rabbitbrush, and antelope bitterbrush are the predominant understory vegetation. Low ground cover includes arrowleaf balsamroot, spiny phlox, common yarrow, longleaf hawksbeard, ragged robin, bitterroot, and nineleaf biscuitroot. Native grass species include wheatgrass, Idaho fescue, Sandberg bluegrass, and giant-heads clover.

Numerous bird species are found on the Powell Buttes. California quail and mountain quail live on the mountain slopes. Other small bird species include black-capped chickadees, mountain chickadee, pine siskins, lesser goldfinches, American goldfinches, canyon wrens, rock wrens, cliff swallows, barn swallows, western meadowlark, mountain bluebirds, sage thrashers, American robins, mourning doves, and Brewers blackbirds. Larger birds include western scrub-jays, Steller’s jays, pinyon jays, Northern flickers, black-billed magpies, and American crows. Birds of prey found on or near Powell Buttes include American kestrel, Cooper’s hawk, northern goshawk, northern harrier, peregrine falcon, prairie falcon, red-tailed hawk, golden eagle, and bald eagle. Burrowing owls, barn owls, great horned owl, and turkey vultures are also common in the area around the mountain.

Small mammals found on the Powell Buttes include American badger, striped skunks, western spotted skunks, common raccoons, black-tailed jackrabbits, mountain cottontails, California ground squirrels, Belding's ground squirrels, Ord's kangaroo rat, and deer mice. Larger mammals include black-tailed deer, coyotes, bobcats, and mountain lions.

Reptiles found on Powell Buttes include common garter snakes, gopher snakes, and western rattlesnakes. Common lizards include short-horned lizards, western fence lizards, sagebrush lizards, and western skinks.

== Human history ==
The Powell Buttes are named for members of the Joseph Powell family who were among the first American pioneers to cross the Cascade Range from the Willamette Valley to range their cattle in Central Oregon.

In 1989, the Bureau of Land Management established a 520-acre (210 ha) Research Natural Area along the south side of the mountain including the southwest and southeast slopes. The area's status was confirmed by a second study in 2005.

A large destination resort by Pahlisch Homes, called the Hidden Canyon, was planned for development on the buttes but never saw completion because of land impact issues related to wildlife, among other reasons.

From 1986 to 2018, Powell Butte was the site of one of two facilities of Oregon State University's Central Oregon Agricultural Research Center. The Powell Butte agricultural research farm acted as a center for potato variety development and hay production. The site encompassed 80 acres (0.32 km^{2}), most of which were dedicated to potato seed development. In 2010, an outbreak of the potato cyst nematode Globodera ellingtonae caused the farm to shut down, with major research activity moving to a different site in the city of Klamath Falls. In June 2018, the land was sold to an industrial hemp producer.
