= Grizzly Mountain (Oregon) =

Mountain in Oregon

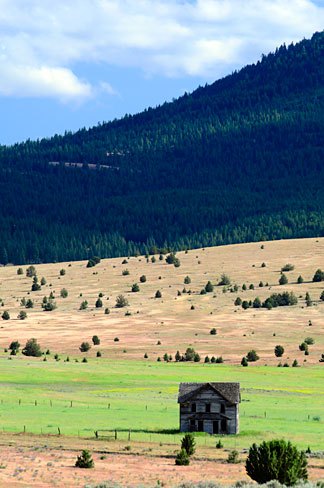
- The northeast slope of Grizzly Mountain.

Highest point
- Elevation: 5,629 ft (1,716 m) NAVD 88
- Prominence: 1,475 ft (450 m)
- Coordinates: 44°26′17″N 120°57′17″W

Geography
- Location within Oregon
- Location: Crook County, Oregon, U.S.
- Topo map: USGS Grizzly Mountain

Grizzly Mountain is located in Crook County, Central Oregon near the city of Prineville. Its summit is at 5,629 feet (1,716 m). It is composed of welded tuff and is a part of the Crooked River caldera.
