= Arthur Tuck =

American javelin thrower (1901–1979)

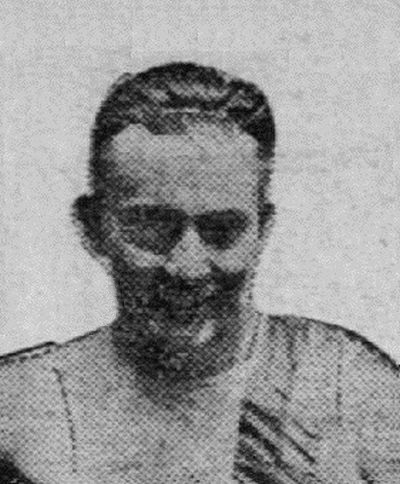

Personal information
- Born: July 8, 1901 Benton, Arkansas
- Died: April 15, 1979 (aged 78) Redmond, Oregon
- Occupation: Police officer
- Height: 6 ft 1 in (1.85 m)
- Weight: 185 lb (84 kg)

Sport
- Country: United States
- Sport: Track and field
- Event: Multiple
- College team: University of Oregon
- Club: Multnomah Athletic Club
- Coached by: Bill Hayward

Achievements and titles
- Olympic finals: 1920 Javelin (11th place)
- Personal best: Javelin 195 feet 9 inches (59.66 m)

Arthur Wood Tuck (July 8, 1901 – April 15, 1979) was an American track and field athlete. In 1919, he singlehandedly won the Oregon state high school track and field team championship for Redmond High School. He later competed for the University of Oregon track and field team and represented the United States in the 1920 Summer Olympics in Belgium.

== Early life ==
Tuck was born on July 8, 1901, in Benton, Arkansas, the son of John and Kattie Tuck. His family later moved to Redmond, Oregon. His father was a public school teacher in Redmond for many years.

== High school athlete ==
Tuck attended high school in Redmond, Oregon. In high school, Tuck was an outstanding track and field athlete. On May 10, 1919, Tuck participated in the Oregon state high school track and field championship, the only athlete competing for Redmond High School. The championship meet included twelve events. Tuck won seven of those events and took second place in another. He earned a total of 38 points in his events. As a result, Redmond High School won the state track and field championship with only one athlete competing.

During the state championship meet, Tuck ran in 13 races including preliminary heats to qualify for finals as well as participating in five field events. Tuck won the 100-yard dash, 220 yard dash, 120 yard hurdles, the high jump, the discus, the javelin, and the shot put. He placed second in the long jump. Tuck also set three state records at the meet. His records were set in the 100-yard dash, the discus, and the javelin. His javelin throw beat the existing state record by 30 feet (9.1 m). Oregon newspapers highlighted his performance at the state championship, making him a well-known sports figure across the state.

After graduating from high school in the summer of 1919, Tuck participated in track and field competitions representing the Multnomah Athletic Club, based in Portland, Oregon. That summer, he placed first in the Amateur Athletic Union junior division javelin competition and third in the senior division. The following summer, he placed fifth in the Amateur Athletic Union's national javelin competition.

== College and Olympic Games ==
Both Oregon State University and the University of Oregon worked hard to recruit Tuck. He decided to attend college at the University of Oregon, where he joined Sigma Nu fraternity. Tuck competed for the Oregon Webfoots (now Ducks) track and field team. During his time at the University of Oregon, Tuck competed in numerous events including javelin, discus, high jump, pole vault, high hurdles, and the pentathlon.

While he was a freshman at the University of Oregon, Tuck participated in the 1920 Summer Olympics. Prior to the Olympic competition, Tuck injured his knee. He was still recovering when the team sailed for Antwerp, Belgium. At the Olympics, he finished eleventh in the javelin competition.

By 1921, Tuck held the Pacific Coast Conference discus and javelin records. His best javelin throw was 195 feet 9 inches (59.66 m), just short of the American record of 197 feet 4 inches (60.15 m). However, he did not return to the university in 1922.

== Later life ==
After leaving the University of Oregon, Tuck joined his brother in the highway construction business. He married Nita How Tuck in the early 1920s. Together, they had three children.

Later, Tuck joined the Oregon State Police. Beginning in the 1930s, he was the sergeant in charge of the Central Oregon patrol area. On November 7, 1937, Sergeant Tuck and Officer Elmer R. Pyle were dispatched to investigate a possible murder on an isolated chicken ranch near Terrebonne. As the two officers approached, the suspect pulled out a shotgun and shot Pyle in the face. The suspect was killed in the gun battle that followed. Pyle died of his wounds seven months later.

After Tuck retired from the police force, his track and field medals and memorabilia were stolen in a burglary. He died in Redmond, Oregon on April 15, 1979.

== Legacy ==
It is likely that Tuck is the only athlete in Oregon history to have won a state track and field team championship singlehandedly. Today, Tuck's scrapbook and photographs are held by the Des Chutes Historical Museum in Bend, Oregon.

== See also ==
- 1920 Summer Olympics
- Athletics at the 1920 Summer Olympics – Men's javelin throw
