= Maarty Leunen =

American basketball player (born 1985)

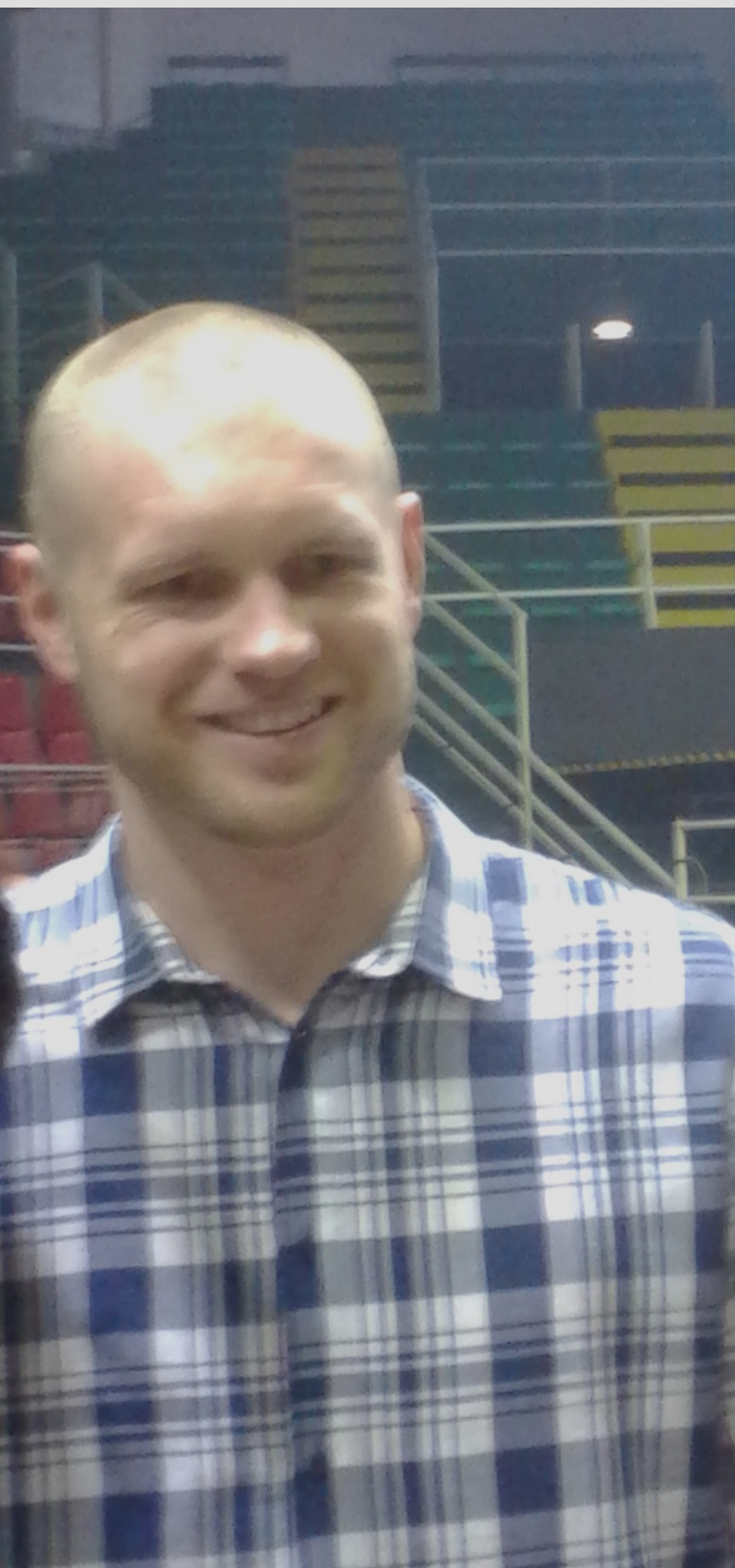
- Leunen in 2016

Personal information
- Born: September 3, 1985 (age 39); Vancouver, Washington, U.S.
- Listed height: 6 ft 9 in (2.06 m)
- Listed weight: 238 lb (108 kg)

Career information
- High school: Redmond (Redmond, Oregon)
- College: Oregon (2004–2008)
- NBA draft: 2008: 2nd round, 54th overall pick
- Drafted by: Houston Rockets
- Playing career: 2008–2021
- Position: Power forward

Career history
- 2008–2009: Darüşşafaka
- 2009–2014: Mapooro Cantù
- 2014–2015: ratiopharm Ulm
- 2015–2018: Sidigas Avellino
- 2018–2020: Fortitudo Bologna
- 2020–2021: Cantù

Career highlights
- Second-team All-Pac-10 (2008)
- Stats at Basketball Reference

Maarten Arthur "Maarty" Leunen (born September 3, 1985) is an American former professional basketball player. A power forward formerly at the University of Oregon, he averaged 9.9 points per game and 7.0 rebounds per game in his college career.

== High school ==
Prior to arriving at the University of Oregon, Leunen starred at Redmond High School in Redmond, Oregon. Leunen led Redmond to the state championship in 2003, where they beat Hillsboro High School 50–47 at Portland's Memorial Coliseum. In 2004, he led Redmond to the state championship game but the team fell short, losing to South Salem High School 54–43 at Eugene's McArthur Court. Leunen was named Gatorade state player of the year in 2004. Rated as the 14th best power forward prospect by Rivals.com, Leunen chose the University of Oregon over offers from UCLA and Gonzaga University as well as many others.

== College career ==
After solid contributions as a true freshman and sophomore for the Ducks, Leunen became one of the most important pieces to Oregon's 2006–2007 campaign. In the Ducks' four-guard offense, Leunen often found himself matched up against bigger, taller opponents. His post defense, rebounding and offensive versatility (namely his ability to shoot the three and run the floor) created problems for opponents all season long. Leunen's junior season performance garnered him All-Pac-10 Honorable Mention status.

== Professional career ==
=== Europe ===
After being drafted by the Houston Rockets, Leunen signed with the Turkish League team Darüşşafaka, which is associated with the big Turkish club Efes Pilsen in the summer of 2008. In July 2009, he joined the Italian League club Pallacanestro Cantù. In July 2014, he signed a one-year deal with the German club ratiopharm Ulm.

On September 11, 2015, Leunen signed with Sidigas Avellino of the Italian Serie A.

Leunen signed with Fortitudo Bologna in 2018. On July 15, 2020, he signed with Pallacanestro Cantù of the Lega Basket Serie A (LBA).

On October 27, 2021, Leunen announced his retirement from professional basketball.

=== NBA ===
Leunen was drafted with the 54th overall pick in the 2008 NBA draft by the Houston Rockets but didn't sign with them. A year later, he was invited to play for the Rockets' summer squad in the 2009 Las Vegas Summer League.

On January 22, 2016, Leunen's draft rights were traded to the Los Angeles Clippers in exchange for Josh Smith, the draft rights to Serhiy Lishchuk and cash considerations.

On July 23, 2018, Leunen's draft rights were traded to the Dallas Mavericks in exchange for Johnathan Motley and the draft rights to Renaldas Seibutis.

On August 1, 2018, Leunen's draft rights were traded back to the Houston Rockets in exchange for Chinanu Onuaku with the 2020 second-round pick and cash considerations.

On February 7, 2019, Leunen's draft rights, along with Nik Stauskas and Wade Baldwin IV, were traded to the Indiana Pacers in exchange for cash considerations.

== Awards and accomplishments ==
- All-Pac-10 Honorable Mention 2007

== Personal life ==
Leunen is married to Caitlin O'Neill, and they have three sons and one daughter. Leunen holds a youth basketball camp in his old hometown of Redmond, Oregon annually. Leunen is also the head basketball coach at Ridgeview High School
