= Edwin Brown High School =

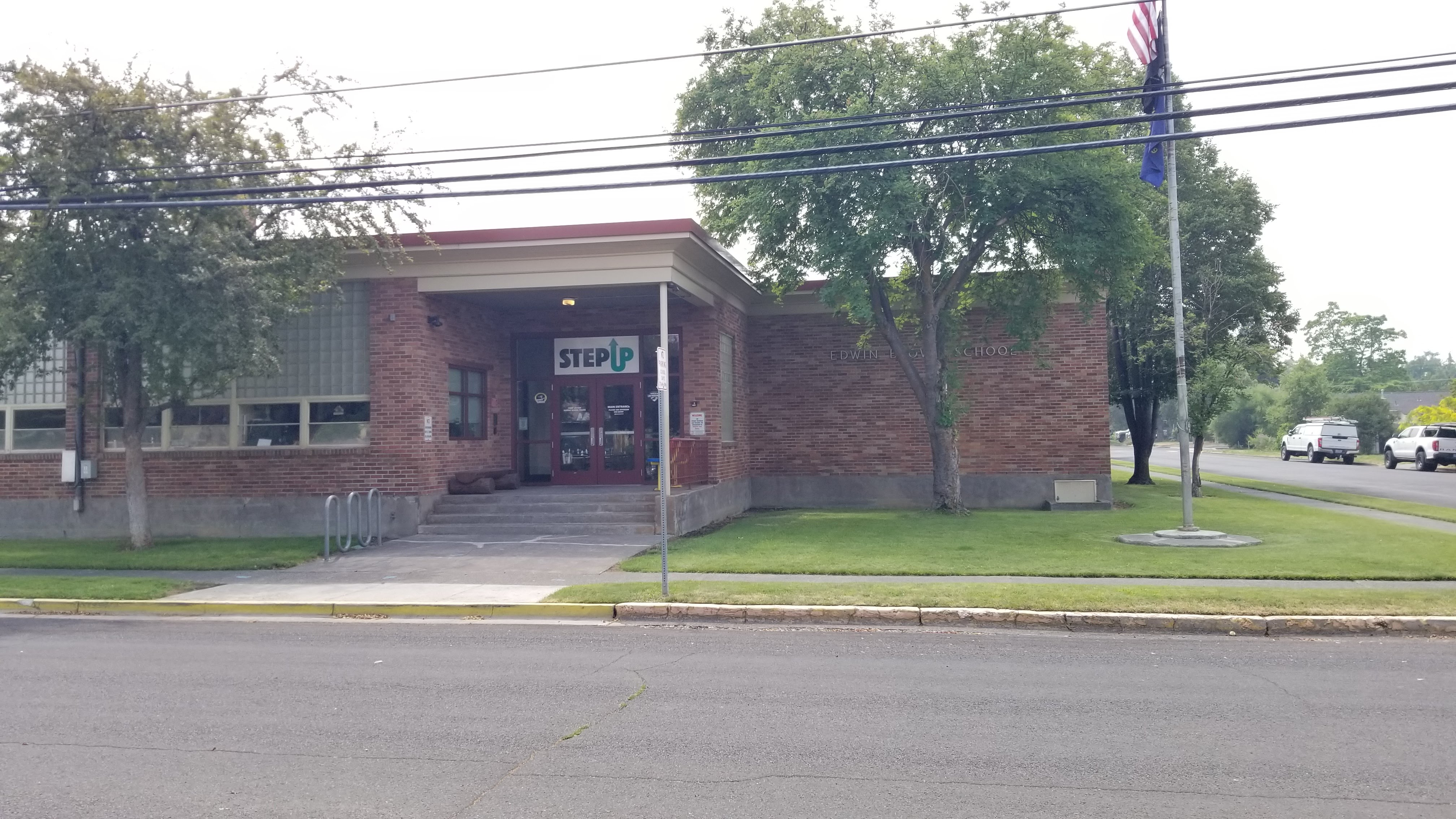
- Edwin Brown High School (Step Up) in July, 2024.

Location
- 850 SW Antler Avenue; Redmond, Deschutes County, Oregon 97756; United States; 44.276276°N 121.177163°W

Information
- Type: Public
- Opened: 1998
- Closed: 2009
- School district: Redmond School District
- Principal: Deborah Newport
- Grades: 6-12
- Enrollment: 101
- Website: www.redmond.k12.or.us/bhs

Edwin Brown High School, also known as Edwin Brown Alternative High School, was an alternative high school in Redmond, Oregon, United States. It merged into Redmond High School in late 2009.

== Academics ==
In 2002, the school was placed on the No Child Left Behind expulsion watch list for the first time.

In 2008, 32% of the school's seniors received their high school diploma. Of 63 students, 20 graduated, 20 dropped out, 4 received a modified diploma, and 19 are still in high school.

In September 2009, the school closed due to a budget shortfall, moving the students to the Hartman campus of Redmond High School.
