= Central Oregon Irrigation District =

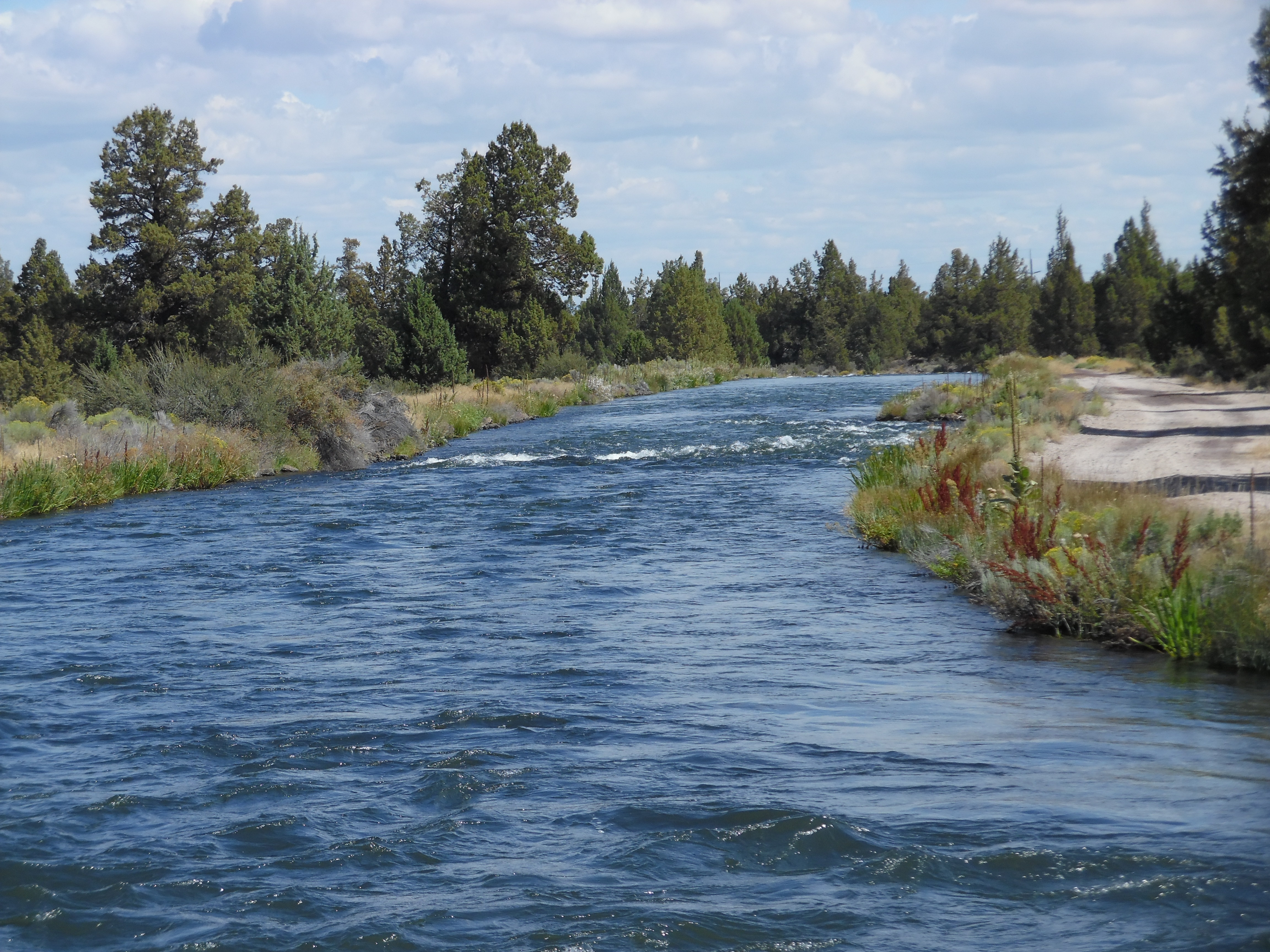
- Pilot Butte Canal north of Bend, Oregon

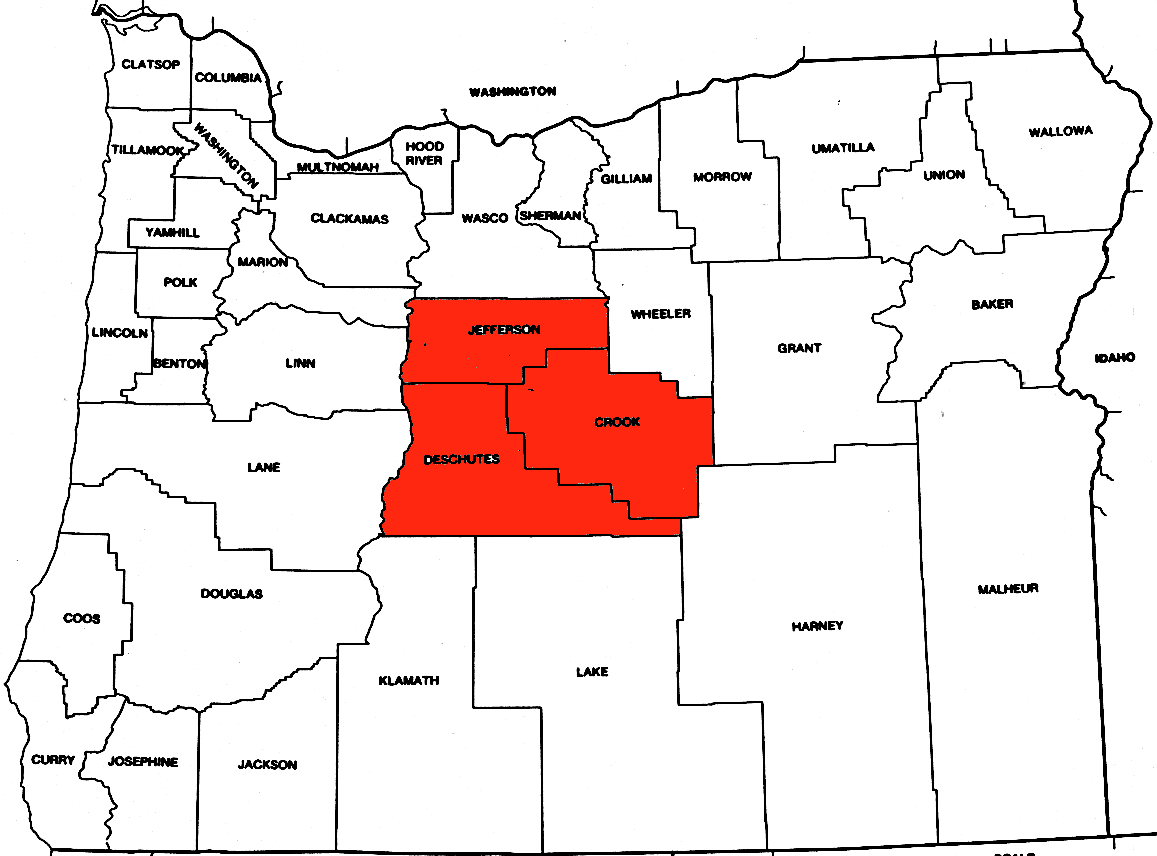
- Oregon counties served by the district
- Predecessor: Pilot Butte Development Company (1902); Deschutes Irrigation and Power Company (1904); and Central Oregon Irrigation Company (1910)
- Formation: 1918
- Founder: Alexander M. Drake (Pilot Butte Development Company founder)
- Type: Municipal corporation
- Headquarters: Redmond, Oregon
- Region served: Central Oregon
- Methods: Canal system

- Central Oregon Canal Historic District (Ward Road–Gosney Road Segment)
- U.S. National Register of Historic Places
- Location: Roughly bounded by Somerset Dr., Bear Creek, Gosney & Ward Rds., Bend Vicinity, Oregon
- NRHP reference No.: 100003461
- Added to NRHP: March 18, 2019

Central Oregon Irrigation District is a municipal corporation to provide irrigation water for Central Oregon, U.S. The canals serve agricultural and industrial users in the arid lands between Alfalfa, Bend, Redmond, Terrebonne, and Powell Butte. Among its 4,000 or so individual customer accounts, it also provides municipal water to the city of Redmond, neighboring subdivisions, and parks and schools in Bend. The district manages more than 700 miles (1,100 km) of canals serving about 70.3 square miles (182 km^{2}) of lands within a rough area of 280 square miles (730 km^{2}).

== History ==
The Carey Act of 1894 led to the creation of the U.S. Bureau of Reclamation which initiated many irrigation projects by authorizing the federal government to contract with the states for arid land reclamation. The State of Oregon authorized entrepreneurs to build and operate canal systems for profit. The right of agricultural users to the water were provisional until irrigation actually began producing crops as provided by the Carey Act. On June 30, 1950, the State of Oregon decreed that the Carey Act had provided ample time for interested water users to have staked a water rights claim, and ended the eligibility opt-in period to receive irrigation water. It took until 1958 to finalize Deschutes River water rights for all users.

The Central Oregon Irrigation District was established in 1918 from the merging of water systems near Bend. Among the earliest was Pilot Butte Development Company, established in 1902 by Alexander M. Drake, a capitalist who arrived in the area in spring of 1900 by covered wagon, lured by the possibility of irrigating upper Deschutes County and dry air for health reasons. Drake's company platted Bend and built a lodge for which Drake Park District and Drake Park are named. Before any water flowed, Pilot Butte was sold to Deschutes Irrigation and Power Company. Service began with 40 acres (16 ha) irrigated in 1904.

Two primary canals—Central Oregon Canal and Pilot Butte Canal—were complete by 1907. Pilot Butte Development Company was foreclosed upon, leading to creation of the Central Oregon Irrigation Company in 1910. The North Canal Dam was connected to Pilot Butte Canal in 1912. The company's ownership was given to its users who created the Central Oregon Irrigation District on December 17, 1917, although legal challenges continued until a court resolution emerged July 9, 1921. Systematic promotion (Free land in Oregon, in the richest grain, fruit and stock section in the world!) and immigration of almost 2,000 people to Bend had the system serving 28,500 acres (11,500 ha) by 1924.

The Ward Road–Gosney Road segment was added to the National Register of Historic Places on March 18, 2019.

== Engineering ==
Creating canals through the Central Oregon plain required the most modern technology and engineering in its day. The land contains thick layer of basalt—a dense, abrasive volcanic rock—underlying relatively thin soils with scant organic matter, typical of the Great Basin arid desert. Canal routes were chosen carefully to use gravity (instead of pumps) and minimize the amount of excavation.

== System ==
Slightly more than half the system is in Deschutes County, a little less than half in Crook County, and roughly 5% in Jefferson County. The source of the entire system is the Deschutes River: The Central Oregon Canal diversion is near the southwestern corner of Bend at 44.0181°N 121.3501°W. It generally flows eastward about 20 miles (30 km) before turning northward. The Pilot Butte Canal diversion is at the north end of downtown Bend at 44.0757°N 121.3060°W and generally flows northward, closely following U.S. Highway 97. A 150-foot (46 m) high flume carries Pilot Butte Canal across the Crooked River at 44.3581°N 121.1185°W.
