= Jed Weaver =

American football player (born 1976)

No. 82, 87, 88, 85
- Position: Tight end

Personal information
- Born: August 11, 1976 (age 50); Bend, Oregon, U.S.
- Listed height: 6 ft 4 in (1.93 m)
- Listed weight: 258 lb (117 kg)

Career information
- High school: Redmond (OR)
- College: Oregon
- NFL draft: 1999: 7th round, 208th overall pick

Career history
- Philadelphia Eagles (1999); Miami Dolphins (2000–2002); San Francisco 49ers (2003); Denver Broncos (2004)*; New England Patriots (2004); Detroit Lions (2006)*
- * Offseason or practice squad member only

Awards and highlights
- Super Bowl champion (XXXIX); NFL All-Rookie Team (1999); Second-team All-Pac-10 (1998)

Career NFL statistics
- Receptions: 88
- Receiving yards: 1,090
- Receiving touchdowns: 6
- Stats at Pro Football Reference

Jed Weaver (born August 11, 1976) is an American former professional football player who played tight end in the National Football League (NFL). He grew up in Redmond, Oregon, becoming an all-league and all-state player in football, basketball and baseball.

== Early life ==
At Redmond High School in Redmond, Oregon, Weaver was a two-sport standout in football, and baseball. In football, he won all-league and all-state honors, while in baseball, as a senior pitcher, he won third-team all-state honors. Weaver played in the Oregon All-State games in both baseball and football before going to the University of Oregon.

== College career ==
Weaver played college football at the University of Oregon after walking on as a freshman, he was then selected in the seventh round of the 1999 NFL draft. He is a cousin of Los Angeles Angels of Anaheim pitcher Jered Weaver and Los Angeles Dodger pitcher Jeff Weaver and his brother Dan Weaver was a 37-game starter at Center for the University of Oregon football program from 2000 to 2003.

== Professional career ==
Weaver was a member of the New England Patriots on the Super Bowl XXXIX Championship team in 2004. He was selected by the Philadelphia Eagles and made the All Rookie team after starting 11 games in 1999, played 3 seasons with the Miami Dolphins from 2000 to 2002, helping the Dolphins to the playoffs in two seasons and in 2002 was a major factor blocking for the rushing title winner that year, Ricky Williams. He moved to the San Francisco 49ers having his best season in 2003 by starting all 16 games and catching 35 passes for 437 yards. His career totals are 96 games played, 88 catches for 1090 yards and 6 touchdowns in 6 seasons.

== Personal life ==
Weaver and his wife Jori currently live in South Florida. He works in real estate, while she owns a women's clothing boutique in Pembroke Pines.
