= Redmond High School =

Redmond High School may refer to:

- Redmond High School (Oregon)
- Redmond High School (Washington)
