= Pronghorn, Oregon =

Unincorporated community in the state of Oregon, United States

- Census-designated place
- Location in the state of Oregon Pronghorn (the United States)
- Coordinates: 44°11′09″N 121°10′21″W
- Country: United States
- State: Oregon
- County: Deschutes

Area
  - Total: 6.58 sq mi (17.05 km^{2})
  - Land: 6.58 sq mi (17.05 km^{2})
  - Water: 0 sq mi (0.00 km^{2})
- Elevation: 3,200 ft (980 m)

Population (2020)
  - Total: 92
  - Density: 14.0/sq mi (5.39/km^{2})
- Time zone: UTC-8 (Pacific (PST))
  - Summer (DST): UTC-7 (PDT)
- Area codes: 458 and 541
- FIPS code: 41-60070
- GNIS feature ID: 2584421

Pronghorn was the U.S. Census name for Pronghorn Resort, an unincorporated resort community and census-designated place (CDP) in Deschutes County, Oregon, United States, located 4 miles (6 km) south of Redmond. As of the 2020 census, Pronghorn had a population of 92. It is part of the Bend, Oregon Metropolitan Statistical Area. Pronghorn Resort was established in 2002 and was rebranded as Juniper Preserve Resort in 2022. The resort includes the Pronghorn Golf Club.

== Demographics ==
Historical population
Census	Pop.	Note	%±
2020	92		—
U.S. Decennial Census

== Education ==
Pronghorn is in the Redmond School District 2J. The zoned schools are: Tumalo Elementary School, Obsidian Middle School, and Ridgeview High School.

Deschutes County is in the boundary of Central Oregon Community College.
