= Crooked River Ranch, Oregon =

Unincorporated community in the state of Oregon, United States

Crooked River Ranch
- Census-designated place
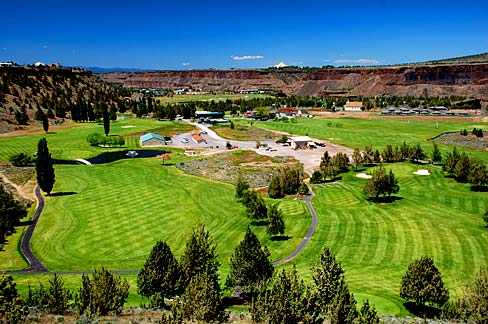
- A golf course at Crooked River Ranch

- Location in Oregon Crooked River Ranch (the United States)
- Coordinates: 44°24′18″N 121°15′48″W
- Country: United States
- State: Oregon
- Counties: Jefferson; Deschutes
- Established: 1992

Area
  - Total: 20.69 sq mi (53.59 km^{2})
  - Land: 20.69 sq mi (53.59 km^{2})
  - Water: 0 sq mi (0.00 km^{2})
- Elevation: 2,795 ft (852 m)

Population (2020)
  - Total: 4,912
  - Density: 237.4/sq mi (91.66/km^{2})
- Time zone: UTC-8 (Pacific)
  - Summer (DST): UTC-7 (Pacific)
- ZIP code: 97760
- FIPS code: 41-16975
- GNIS feature ID: 2787935
- Website: www.crookedriverranch.com

Crooked River Ranch is an unincorporated community and census-designated place (CDP) in southern Jefferson County, Oregon, United States. A small portion of the ranch is also in north Deschutes County. The Ranch is located between the Deschutes River and the Crooked River near the south end of Lake Billy Chinook. It is west of U.S. Route 97 between Culver and Terrebonne. Amenities in the community include a golf course, swimming pool, tennis courts, saloon, disc golf course, horse riding arena and general store. The ranch is approximately 12,000 acres, and as of the 2020 census had a population of 4,912. It is the largest homeowner association in Oregon. Crooked River Ranch has a Terrebonne mailing address, but the postal service also allows mail addressed to Crooked River, Oregon or Crooked River Ranch, Oregon. The ZIP code is 97760.

== History ==
Prior to European Colonialism, this area was populated by groups of people from what is now known as the Confederated Tribes of Warm Springs.

In 1910, Hillsboro politician Harry V. Gates bought the Crooked River Ranch property from local homesteaders and named it "Gates Ranch". The main ranch house was built in 1916 and is currently in use as a senior center. The property was named "Crooked River Ranch" as early as 1934. In 1961 the ranch was sold to the Thomas Bell family, who operated it as the Z-Z Cattle Co. for the next 10 years. In 1972 Crooked River Ranch was sold and developed as a recreational site. In 1980, the ranch's zoning changed from recreational to rural/residential. In 1992, the site was rezoned as a residential subdivision.

== Demographics ==
Historical population
| Census | Pop. | Note | %± |
|---|---|---|---|
| 2020 | 4,912 | | — |
U.S. Decennial Census

=== 2020 census ===
As of the 2020 census, Crooked River Ranch had a population of 4,912. The median age was 57.6 years. 13.4% of residents were under the age of 18 and 34.6% of residents were 65 years of age or older. For every 100 females there were 103.9 males, and for every 100 females age 18 and over there were 102.8 males age 18 and over.

0.0% of residents lived in urban areas, while 100.0% lived in rural areas.

There were 2,092 households in Crooked River Ranch, of which 18.3% had children under the age of 18 living in them. Of all households, 61.9% were married-couple households, 15.1% were households with a male householder and no spouse or partner present, and 16.3% were households with a female householder and no spouse or partner present. About 19.9% of all households were made up of individuals and 11.2% had someone living alone who was 65 years of age or older.

There were 2,369 housing units, of which 11.7% were vacant. The homeowner vacancy rate was 1.6% and the rental vacancy rate was 2.2%.

Racial composition as of the 2020 census
| Race | Number | Percent |
|---|---|---|
| White | 4,469 | 91.0% |
| Black or African American | 8 | 0.2% |
| American Indian and Alaska Native | 57 | 1.2% |
| Asian | 20 | 0.4% |
| Native Hawaiian and Other Pacific Islander | 2 | 0.0% |
| Some other race | 54 | 1.1% |
| Two or more races | 302 | 6.1% |
| Hispanic or Latino (of any race) | 198 | 4.0% |

== Education ==
Primary and secondary school students in Crooked River Ranch are served by the Culver School District and the Redmond School District. The Jefferson County portion is divided between those two school districts. All of Crooked River Ranch in Deschutes County is zoned to the Redmond School District.

The zoned schools for the portion in the Redmond district are: Terrebonne Elementary School, Elton Gregory Middle School, and Redmond High School.

The Culver district's comprehensive high school is Culver High School.

Both Jefferson and Deschutes counties are in the boundary of Central Oregon Community College.

== See also ==
- Black Butte Ranch, Oregon
- Crooked River National Grassland
- Eagle Crest Resort
- Sunriver, Oregon
