= Alfalfa, Oregon =

Unincorporated community in the state of Oregon, United States

Coordinates: 44.0775°N 121.01583°W

Alfalfa is an unincorporated community in Deschutes County, Oregon, United States, in the high desert 16 miles (26 km) east of Bend. Alfalfa was named for the primary forage crop grown there under irrigation. Alfalfa had a post office from 1912 until 1922. The community serves a population of about 400 families living in the surrounding farms.

Alfalfa's 80-day growing season limits the local farmers to growing grass and alfalfa, and because the crop yields are so low, the grass is considered somewhat more suitable for grazing livestock—most commonly cattle—than for haying. The Alfalfa irrigation district was formed in the early 1900s, and many of the local houses date to that time. The Central Oregon Canal passes through the community.

Alfalfa is sixteen miles east of Bend, but has a Bend zip code. With potential zoning changes that came with the passage of Oregon's Measure 37 in 2004, the community's rural character appeared it may change from being primarily agricultural to residential, but Measure 49 reversed nearly all of Measure 37, and today Alfalfa continues to be a primarily agricultural area.

The hub of the community is the Alfalfa Store. Alfalfa Grange is a historic grange hall, also known as the Alfalfa Community Hall. Deschutes County considers the 1930 building a historic landmark. The hall is the meeting location of the Alfalfa Community Church.

== Education ==
Alfalfa is a part of the Redmond School District. Zoned schools include: Tumalo Elementary School, Obsidian Middle School, and Ridgeview High School.

Alfalfa Grade School was founded in 1911 and closed in 1987. Alfalfa was in its own school district, but parents approved the district merging into the Redmond school district in a May 1966 referendum as a way of facilitating high school education. At the time the one-teacher, two-room school closed, it served 18 students in kindergarten through second grade. The Redmond School District board of trustees voted to close it. There was an unsuccessful petition to keep the school open for one more year. Now, despite being closer to Bend, all public school students from Alfalfa attend school in the Redmond area.

Deschutes County is in the boundary of Central Oregon Community College.
