= Tumalo, Oregon =

Unincorporated community in the state of Oregon, United States

- Census-designated place
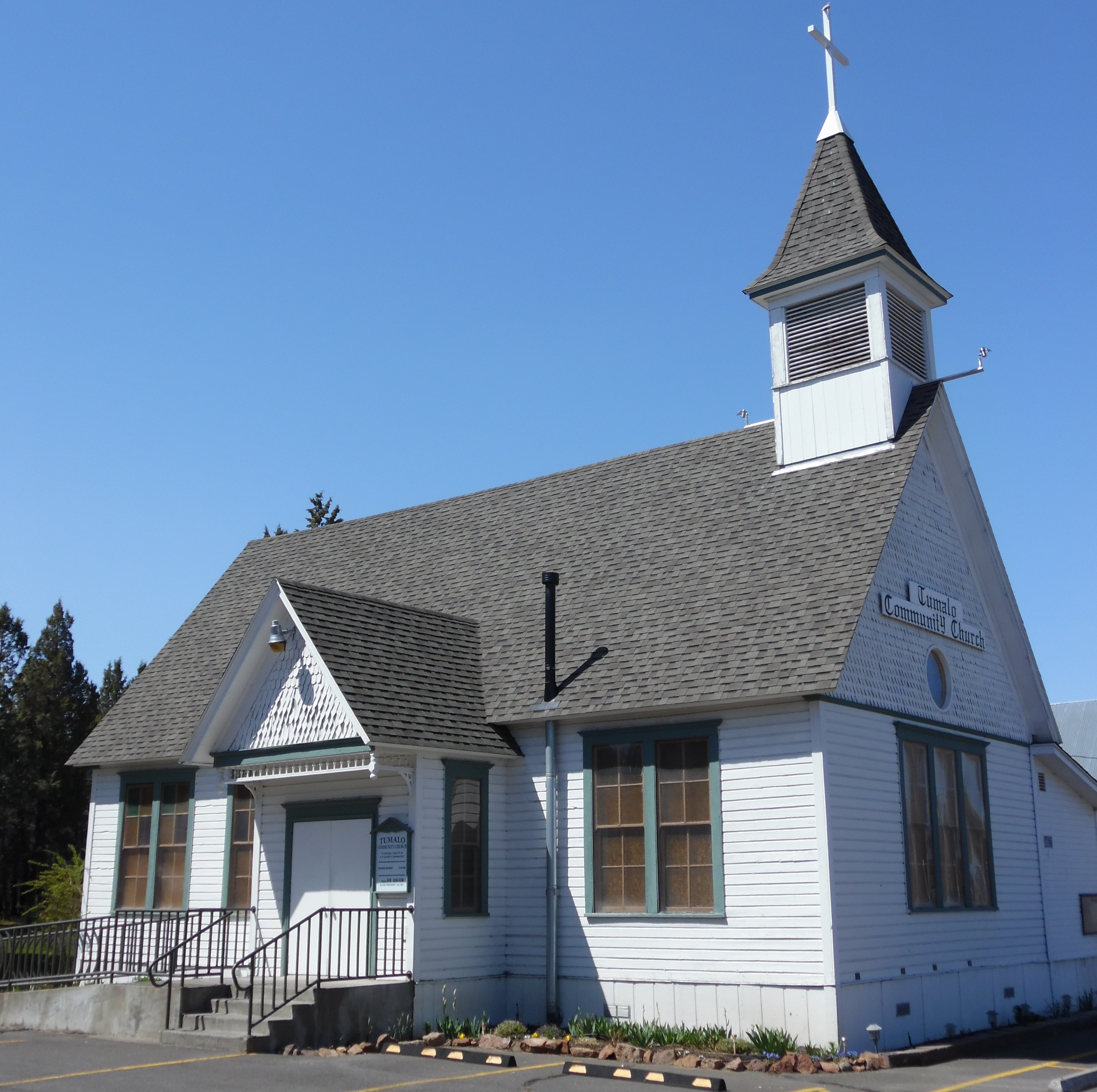
- Tumalo Community Church, 2015

- Location within Oregon
- Coordinates: 44°08′59″N 121°19′51″W
- Country: United States
- State: Oregon
- County: Deschutes

Area
  - Total: 1.71 sq mi (4.42 km^{2})
  - Land: 1.71 sq mi (4.42 km^{2})
  - Water: 0 sq mi (0.00 km^{2})
- Elevation: 3,189 ft (972 m)

Population (2020)
  - Total: 558
  - Density: 327.0/sq mi (126.25/km^{2})
- Time zone: UTC-8 (Pacific (PST))
  - Summer (DST): UTC-7 (PDT)
- ZIP code: 97703
- FIPS code: 41-75050
- GNIS feature ID: 2584428

Tumalo (/ˈtʌməloʊ/ TUM-ə-loh) is an unincorporated community and census-designated place (CDP) in Deschutes County, Oregon, United States. As of the 2020 census, Tumalo had a population of 558. In the Klamath language, tumolo means "wild plum," a plentiful shrub in south central Oregon. Tumola means "ground fog," which may have described Tumalo Creek. Tumallowa, the original name of Tumalo Creek, means "icy water."

== History ==
The town was originally called "Laidlaw", after W. A. Laidlaw, the town promoter. The Tumalo Irrigation Project and Tumalo post office had been established in 1904. Although the project ended and the Tumalo post office closed in 1913, by 1915 residents of Laidlaw changed the town name to "Tumalo".

Due to population growth in the Bend area a new zip code was added effective July 1, 2015. The new zip code, 97703, changed the zip code of Tumalo from 97701 to 97703.

== Geography ==
Tumalo is in north-central Deschutes County on U.S. Route 20 between Sisters, 15 miles (24 km) to the northwest, and Bend, the county seat 7 miles (11 km) to the south. Eagle Crest Resort is 9 miles (14 km) to the northeast.

According to the U.S. Census Bureau, Tumalo has an area of 1.7 square miles (4.4 km^{2}), all of it land. The town lies along the Deschutes River. Tumalo Creek joins the Deschutes 3 miles (5 km) south of the town.

== Demographics ==
Historical population
| Census | Pop. | Note | %± |
|---|---|---|---|
| 2020 | 558 | | — |
U.S. Decennial Census

== Education ==
It is in the Redmond School District 2J. The zoned schools are: Tumalo Elementary School, Obsidian Middle School, and Ridgeview High School.

In previous eras, there was a Tumalo elementary school district. In 1966, the Tumalo district, among others, was to merge into the Redmond elementary school district.

Deschutes County is in the boundary of Central Oregon Community College.

== Notable residents ==
- Ben Westlund, politician

== See also ==
- Tumalo Mountain
- Tumalo State Park
