= Ridgeview High School (Redmond, Oregon) =

High school in Redmond, Oregon, United States

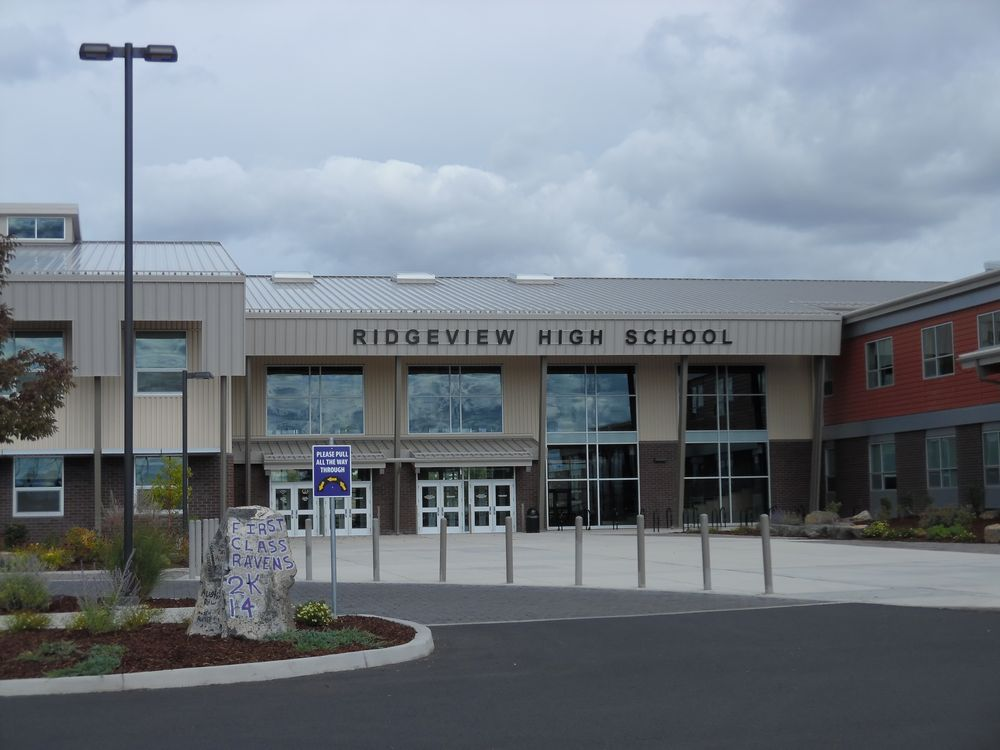

Location
- 4555 SW Elkhorn Street; Redmond, Deschutes, Oregon 97756; United States; 44.2354°N 121.218°W

Information
- Type: Public
- Opened: 2012
- School district: Redmond School District
- Principal: Brian Crook
- Teaching staff: 40.05 (FTE)
- Grades: 9–12
- Enrollment: 844 (2024–2025)
- Student to teacher ratio: 21.07
- Colors: Purple, black and silver
- Athletics conference: OSAA Intermountain Hybrid 5A
- Team name: Ravens
- Rival: Redmond High School
- Website: Official website

Ridgeview High School (RVHS) is a public high school located in Redmond, Oregon, United States. Opened in 2012, it is the second high school in the Redmond School District. In athletics the school is a 5A team in the Oregon School Activities Association, competing primarily in the Intermountain Conference with rival Redmond High School.

The high school's attendance boundary includes: Alfalfa, Eagle Crest and Tumalo.

== History ==
Voters in the school district approved a $110-million bond measure in 2008 to pay for a new high school and other construction. Construction began in 2011 and the school opened in fall 2012. The school took the name Ridgeview in February 2011.

== Building ==
The 280,000-square-foot (26,000 m^{2}) school cost $75 million to build. The two-story structure was designed by Dull Olson Weekes Architects, and built by Skanska USA. The school sits on 55 acres (22 ha) along the Old Bend-Redmond Highway and is designed to handle about 1,400 students. The school's gymnasium can seat approximately 2,000 people, while the auditorium can handle over 600. In addition to the main gymnasium, there is a separate wrestling room. The auditorium includes trap doors on the stage as well as a full-size orchestra pit.

Overall, the building was designed to Leadership in Energy and Environmental Design (LEED) Gold standards, with sustainable features such as solar panels. Other features of the building include a kitchen for students in the culinary arts program, a media studio complete with green screen, flexible classroom spaces, medical classrooms, and lab space for jewelry-making.

== Athletics ==
The school fields teams in cross country, football, soccer, volleyball, basketball, swimming, wrestling, golf, baseball, softball, tennis, and track and field. The school is in the 5A classification of the Oregon School Activities Association and competes in the Intermountain Conference. Known as the Ravens, the school colors are purple, black and silver. The school's 1,400-seat football stadium is located on campus and has an eight-lane track encircling the field. The Ravens varsity football team won the 2013 OSAA 4A state title in only its second year as a public school. There are also two softball and two baseball diamonds, along with a weight room, wrestling room, gymnasium, and eight tennis courts.
