= Central Oregon =

- Region
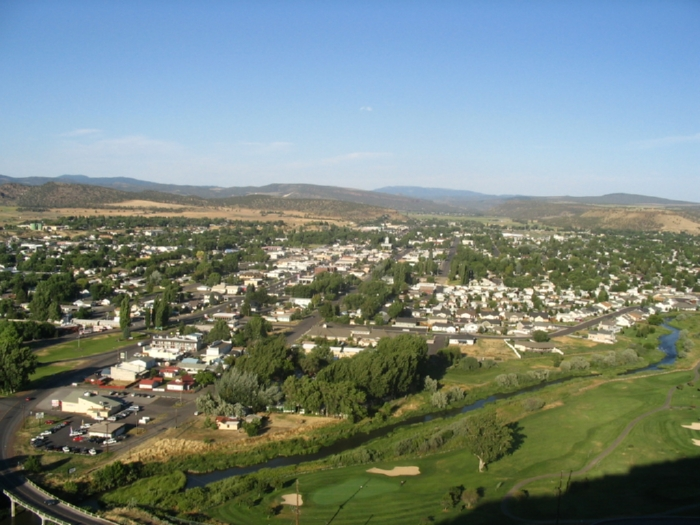
- Panorama of Prineville in Crook County, and the Ochoco Mountains.

- Coordinates: 44.5°N 121°W
- Country: United States
- State: Oregon
- Cities: Bend; Madras; Prineville; Redmond; Sisters

Area
  - Total: 7,833 sq mi (20,290 km^{2})

Population
  - Estimate (2014): 213,578
- Website: www.visitcentraloregon.com

Central Oregon is a geographic region in the U.S. state of Oregon and is traditionally considered to be made up of Deschutes, Jefferson, and Crook counties. Other definitions include larger areas, often encompassing areas to the north towards the Columbia River, eastward towards Burns, or south towards Klamath Falls. These three counties have a combined population of 200,431 as of the 2010 census, with Deschutes the largest of the three counties, having approximately four times the population of the other two counties combined. As of 2015, the most populous city in the region is Bend, with an estimated 87,014 residents. As defined by the three county definition, Central Oregon covers 7,833 square miles (20,290 km^{2}) of land. Central Oregon has had 3 record tourism years beginning in 2012. Over 2.2 million people visited Central Oregon in 2012 and again in 2013.

The region is located in the middle of the state with the Cascades to the west dividing the state from north to south, and the smaller Ochoco Mountains to the east. Portions of the region are part of a basalt plateau formed by the Columbia River Basalt Group, others are part of the slopes of the Cascades, and others part of the Basin and Range. The climate of the area is primarily arid due to the rain shadow effect of the Cascades on the western boundary of the region. Outdoor recreational activities, timber, and ranching are the primary economic activities.

== Geography ==
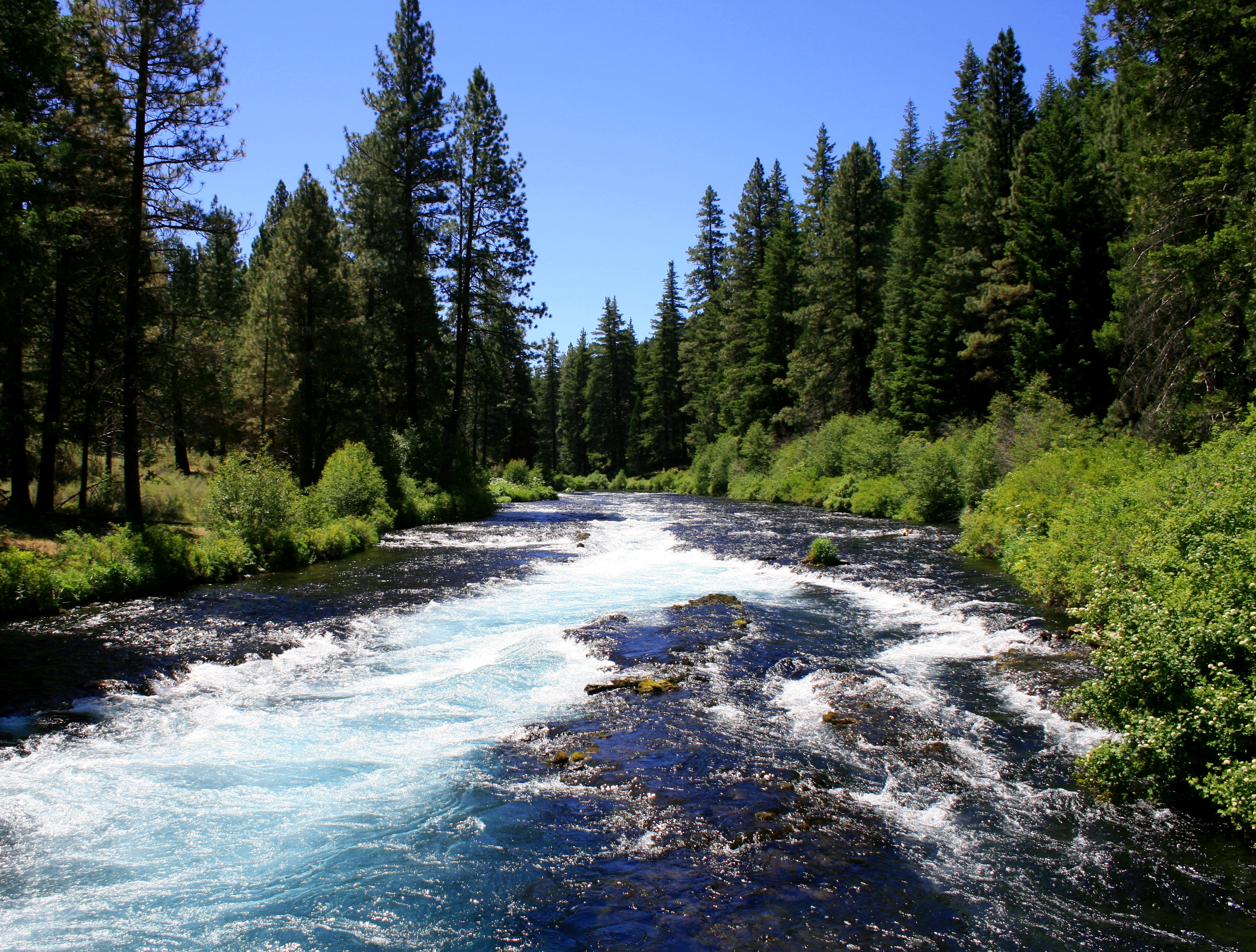
The Metolius River near Camp Sherman.

The Central Oregon region covers approximately 7,833 square miles (20,290 km^{2}), and sits at the convergence of the Basin and Range, Cascades, Blue Mountains, and Columbia River Plateau geologic regions. Because it is part of a historically volcanic region, volcanic rock formations are a common sight, including lava beds, volcanic buttes, crater lakes, volcanic plugs, and lava tubes. Consequently, Deschutes is the most cave-rich county in Oregon with over 500 lava tubes.

The primary river flowing through Central Oregon is the Deschutes River. Its source is Little Lava Lake in the Cascade Mountains, northwest of LaPine. The Deschutes runs south to north, eventually flowing into the Columbia River. Along its way, dams control its flow creating Crane Prairie Reservoir and Wickiup Reservoir. The river runs alongside the resort community of Sunriver and through the city of Bend. It is tapped as a water source for the Central Oregon Irrigation District which serves agricultural and municipal users. As the river continues north, it flows past the Eagle Crest Resort and the city of Redmond. North of Redmond, the Deschutes River has cut a 300 feet (91 m) deep canyon. West of Madras, Round Butte Dam impounds the Deschutes River, creating Lake Billy Chinook.

The two largest tributaries of the Deschutes are the Metolius River and the Crooked River. The Metolius begins at Metolius Springs and runs northeast, flowing into the Deschutes from the west just south of Round Butte Dam. The Crooked River flows west from its sources in the Ochoco Mountains and the Oregon high desert. It flows into the Deschutes from the east at Cove Palisades State Park. Both rivers merge into the Deschutes River, becoming part of Lake Billy Chinook, the reservoir created by the Round Butte Dam.

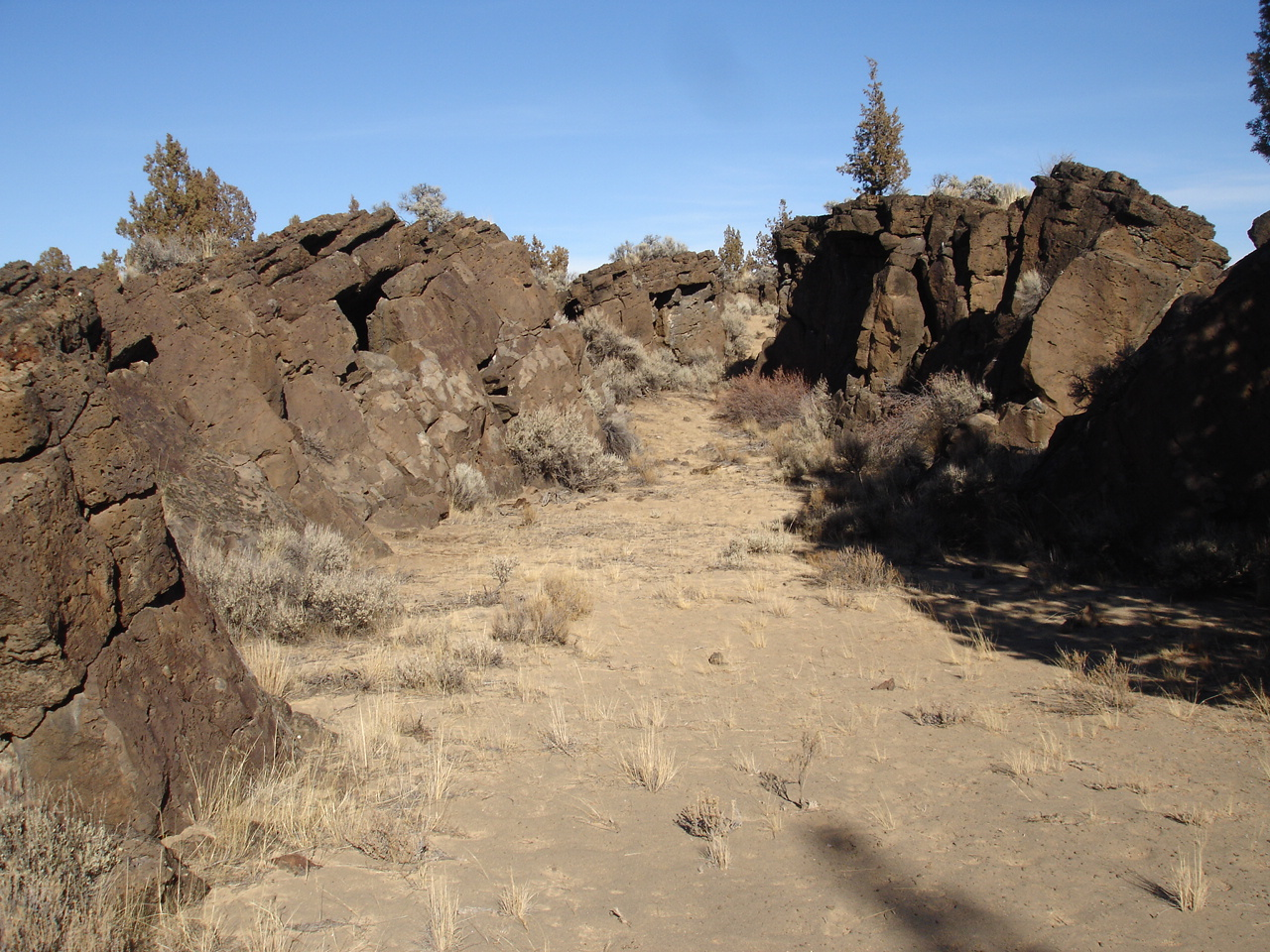
The Oregon Badlands Wilderness.

The native plant life of Central Oregon can be divided between the Ponderosa forests at the foot of the Cascades, and the smaller Western Juniper forests to the east, with the Deschutes River being a rough boundary between the two. Because of the lack of precipitation, high temperatures, and lightning storms during the late summer, wildfires are a common occurrence. Small fires are essential, as they burn away detritus. With the arrival of European settlers, fire suppression became common. However, due to decades of fire suppression, several major wildfires have broken out and threatened large settlements. Major wildfires are becoming less common as the practice of controlled burns by local officials are more frequent. The Oregon Badlands Wilderness preserves the indigenous character, flora, and fauna of the desert basin and is located about 20 miles (32 km) east of Bend.

The distribution of people in Central Oregon occurs mainly near its rivers. Most of its towns are built on riverside plains and between their surrounding foothills. Irrigation development in the region has made its otherwise arid flatlands useful for extensive hay production, farming, and livestock raising.

== History ==
Before European settlers arrived in the 19th century, Central Oregon was inhabited by the southernmost Sahaptin tribes and the northernmost tribes of the Northern Paiute. However, with the arrival of settlers along the Oregon Trail in the mid-19th century, both tribes soon found themselves at odds with the settlers and the U.S. Army.

Peter Skene Ogden led a party of Hudson's Bay Company trapping through Central Oregon in 1826, becoming the first Euro-Americans explorers to visit the area. In 1843, Captain John C. Fremont and his Army survey team explored and mapped the western part of Central Oregon. Fremont was charged with mapping the Oregon Territory east of the Cascade Mountains from The Dalles on Columbia River to Sutter's Fort in Sacramento, California. The Fremont party, including Kit Carson and Thomas Fitzpatrick, camped near Bend on 4 December 1843.

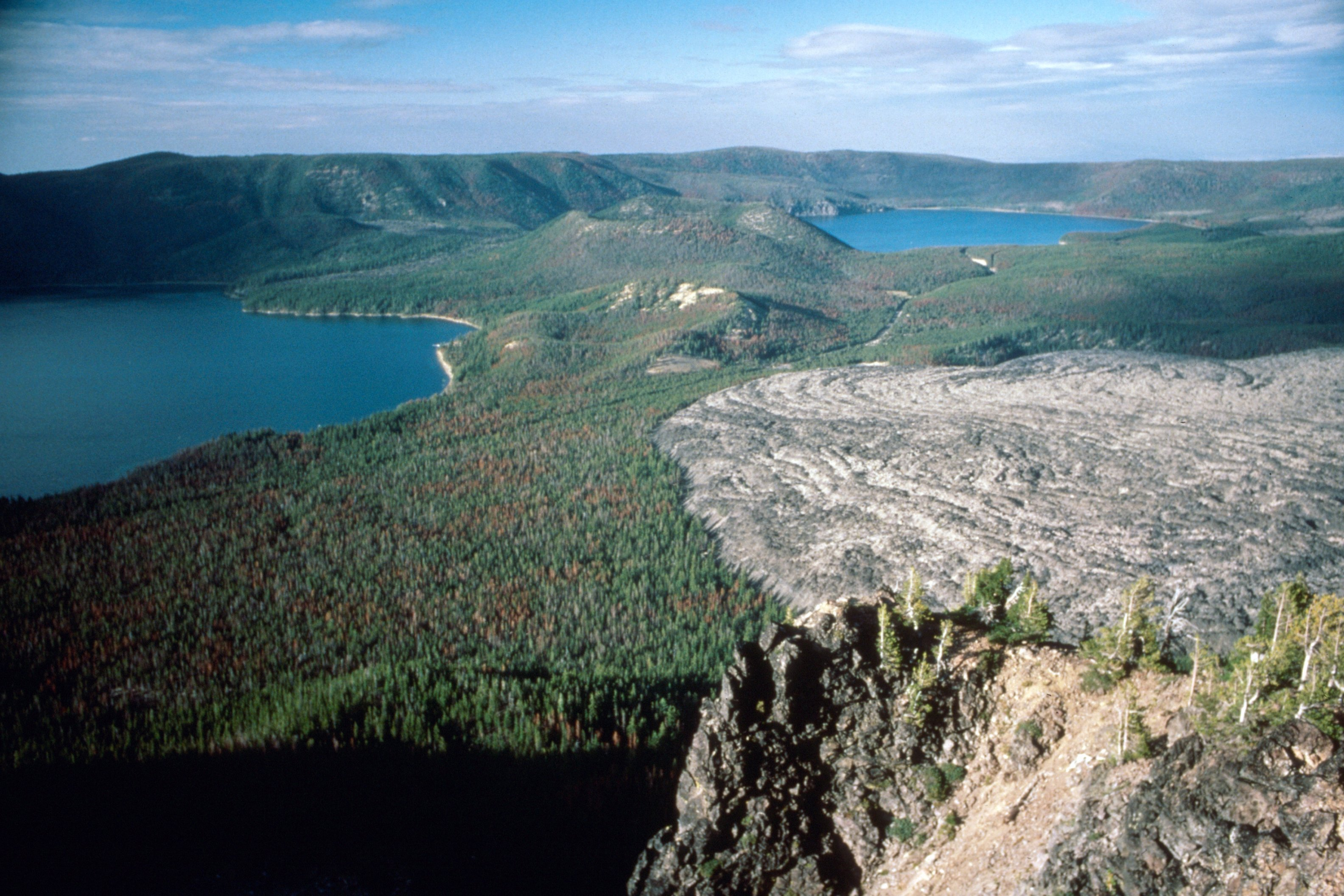
Newberry caldera at the Newberry National Volcanic Monument.

In 1855, Secretary of War Jefferson Davis dispatched an Army Corps of Topographical Engineers' survey party to look for a railroad route from the Sacramento Valley in California to the Columbia River in the Oregon Territory. This required the party to survey the Deschutes River area in central Oregon. The survey party was led by two Lieutenants, Robert Stockton Williamson and Henry Larcom Abbot. Newberry Crater is named after John Strong Newberry, the party's chief scientist.

In 1865, a Company of the 1st Oregon Volunteer Infantry Regiment led by Captain Charles Lafollett established Camp Polk. The fort was set up to protect early settlers from Indian raids. It was built 2.68 miles (4.31 km) northeast of modern-day Sisters. However, the post was soon abandoned.

Not long after, homesteaders began to settle the region, making use of the wide open lands for ranches. In 1877, Prineville became the first city in the region, followed in 1888 by the founding of Sisters.

In the early 20th century, several major highways were constructed in the region, connecting it to the rest of the state. U.S. Route 97 would connect the region to the Columbia River and Portland, and Routes 20, 22, and 126 to the Willamette Valley.

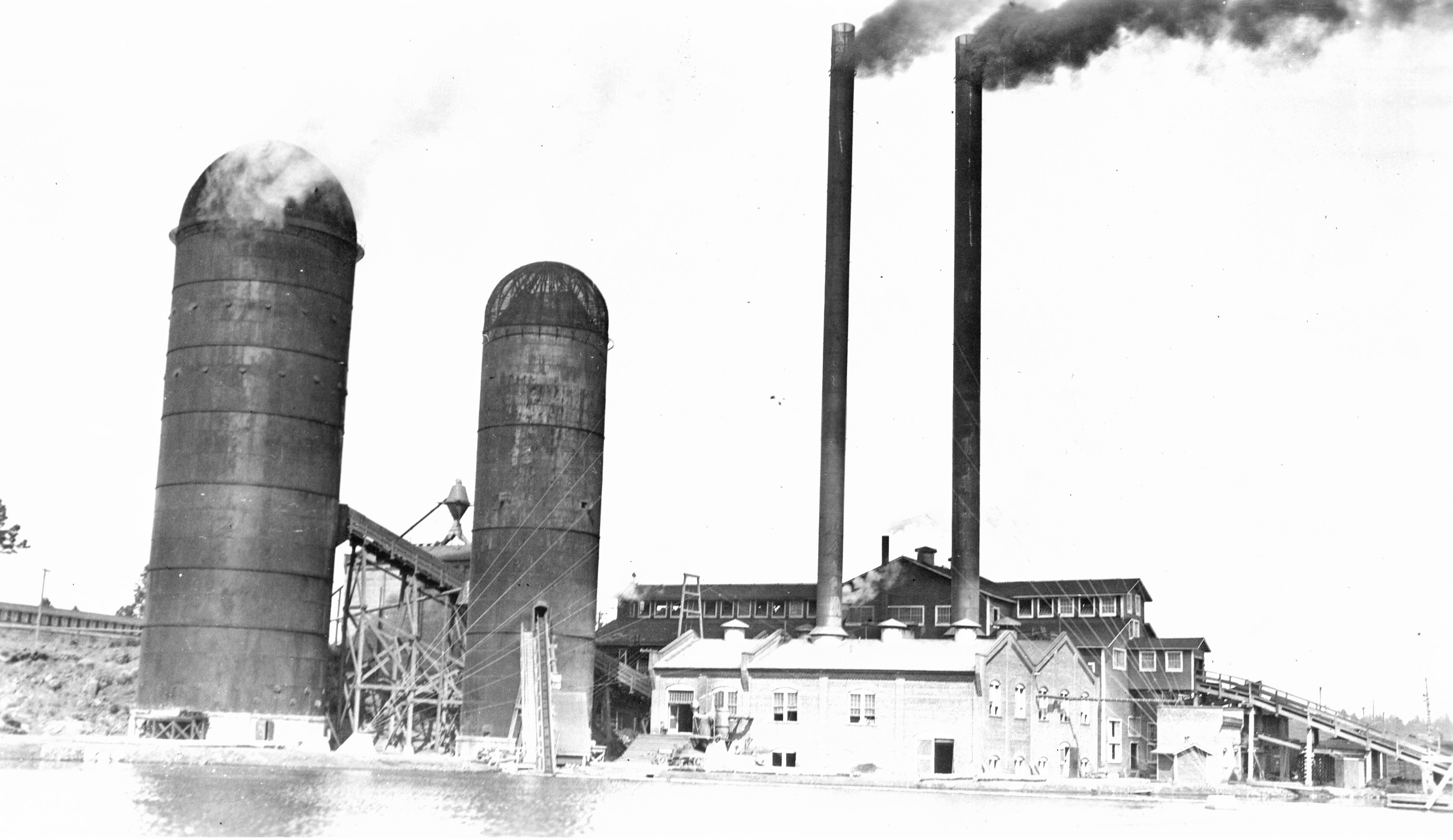
Brooks-Scanlon Lumber Company in Bend, Oregon.

In the first half of the 20th century, the lumber industry dominated Central Oregon's economy. By 1915, two competing companies had built large sawmills south of Bend. The combined output of the Shevlin-Hixon and Brooks-Scanlon mills made Bend one of the largest lumber producing towns in the world. In 1924, the Shevlin-Hixon mill alone processed 200,000,000 board feet (500,000 m^{3}) of lumber. There were at least eight lumber mills in the Prineville areas as well. In the early 1930s, Sam Johnson opened a lumber mill in Sisters, the first of six Central Oregon mills the Johnson family owned over the years. During World War II, the demand for timber increased dramatically and Central Oregon mill towns went through a period significant growth. After the war, Johnson opened a large mill in Redmond.

The Shevlin-Hixon mill closed in the early 1950s. Johnson's Redmond mill was destroyed by fire in 1963, and the last mill in Sisters closed that same year. In 1967, Johnson sold his last mill at Warm Springs to the Warm Springs tribal council and provided additional plywood and veneer-making equipment to help the tribe establish Warm Springs Forest Products Industries. The Brooks-Scanlon Lumber Company sold their remaining timber land in the 1980s.

== Ecology ==
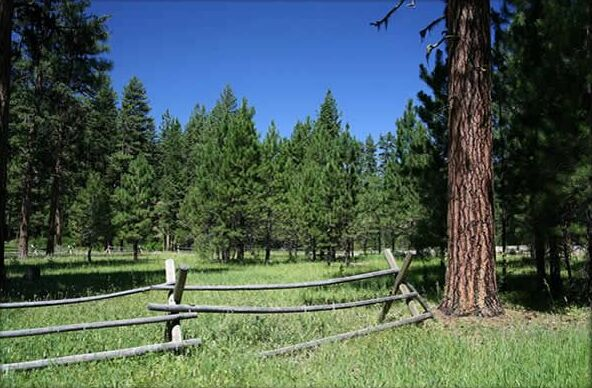
Ponderosa pines in the Ochoco National Forest

Central Oregon has a wide variety of habitats including mountain high country, conifer forest lands, riparian areas, high desert, and alkali flats.

Unlike the wetter regions west of the Cascades, plant and animal life is less diverse but hardier due to the arid nature of the region. Plant life, though not suitable for truly arid regions to the south, have evolved several defenses against water loss, as well as adaptions related to the yearly fires that burn through the region. Trees, such as the ponderosa pine, have thicker bark and do not bleed sap as profusely as trees to the west. Likewise, this thicker bark doesn't burn very easily. In fact, the ponderosa requires small brush fires to burn through, as their cones are opened by the heat of the passing fires. Likewise, plants such as the black sagebrush and cheatgrass occur frequently within the region, especially among the shorter western juniper. There are also many different species of wildflower.

Common large mammals in Central Oregon include American black bear, cougar, bobcat, coyote, gray fox, red fox, mule deer, black-tailed deer, Rocky Mountain elk, pronghorn, and bighorn sheep. Examples of smaller mammals are beaver, raccoon, weasel, otter, mink, fisher, marten, striped skunk, black-tailed jackrabbit, mountain cottontail, pygmy rabbit, golden-mantled ground squirrel, and least chipmunk.

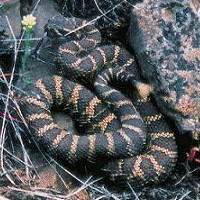
Western rattlesnake, Crotalus oreganus sub. oreganus

Twelve species of hawks and eagles are found in Central Oregon. There are also five falcon species. These birds of prey include bald eagle, golden eagle, northern goshawk, northern harrier, red-tailed hawk, American kestrel, prairie falcon, and peregrine falcon. There are thirteen owl species, including barn owl, barred owl, boreal owl, burrowing owl, great gray owl, and great horned owl. Turkey vultures are also common. Central Oregon is home to seven woodpecker species, including downy woodpecker, hairy woodpecker, and Lewis's woodpecker. Northern flickers are found in the Central Oregon woodlands. There are a number of smaller birds as well. These include various larks, tanagers, swallows, jays, crows, chickadees, wrentits, dippers, nuthatches, wrens, thrushes, and grosbeaks.

There are nine snake species found in Central Oregon. These include western rattlesnake, gopher snake, rubber boa, northwestern garter snake, and common garter snake. There are also numerous turtles, lizards, and frogs native to the region. These include western pond turtle, common collared lizard, northern alligator lizard, sagebrush lizard, short-horned lizard, western fence lizard, western skink, bullfrog, and Cascades frog.

Historically, the local rivers have also been populated by several species of Pacific Ocean salmon. However, because of the numerous hydroelectric dams on the Columbia, there has been a reduction in the number of ocean-going species of fish.

== Climate ==
Because it sits in the rain shadow of the Cascade mountains, the climate is dry and sunny. The climate varies some among Central Oregon communities, but will see approximately 300 days of sunshine a year, which is the area's real draw. Summer temperatures range between 45 and 85 °F (7 and 29 °C) and winter months average between 20 and 40 °F (−7 and 4 °C). Precipitation falls mostly in the winter season as snow, which ranges from 8 to 22 inches. Winter snowfalls are also dangerous. Snowfalls quickly build up layers of ice as it begins to melt and refreeze daily over the months of December and January. This means that the snow is heavier and more solid, making it difficult to plow.

== Economy ==
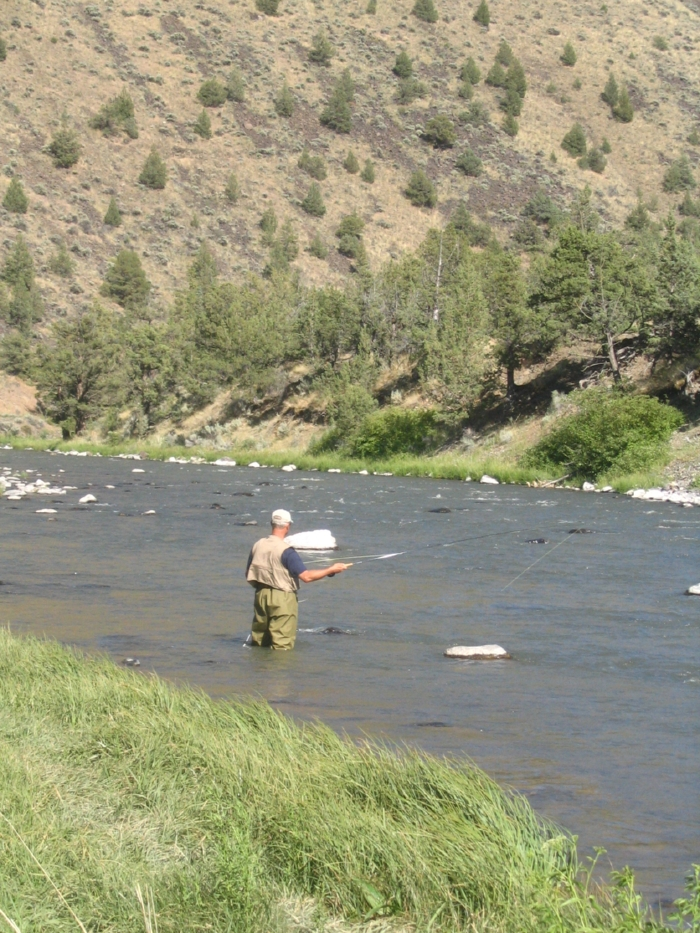
Fly fishing is a popular pastime in Central Oregon.

The economy of Central Oregon relies heavily upon timber, ranching, and outdoor recreation. Much of Central Oregon is covered in forest and, while logging has declined in recent years, it is still an important part of the regional economy. These and other areas are used for the raising and grazing of livestock. A wide variety of outdoor recreation opportunities are also available in the region.

The Deschutes National Forest includes approximately 1,800,000 acres (7,300 km^{2}) along the east side of the Cascade mountains. Deschutes National Forest lands cover much of Deschutes and Jefferson counties, extending into the northern parts of Klamath County and Lake County. The Ochoco National Forest is located north and east of Prineville. It covers approximately 850,000 acres (3,400 km^{2}) in the Ochoco Mountains and surrounding areas. The timber and recreation opportunities of these two national forests are great assets to the Central Oregon region. Together, the two forests support many local businesses, contributing to the economic livelihood of more than 50,000 people in the region.

Central Oregon is also rich with recreational activities. Both summer and winter recreation are big regional draws for sportsmen and tourists. Skiing, snowboarding, cross-country skiing, and snowmobiling are popular in the winter, while water skiing, boating, fishing, hiking, rock climbing, and several other activities draw outdoors enthusiasts during the summer. Because of the many rivers and lakes in Central Oregon along with the high Cascades mountains, it has been dubbed an "outdoor playground".

Central Oregon is the home of five "destination resorts", as defined by the Oregon Department of Land Conservation and Development: Brasada Ranch to the northeast of Bend; Sunriver to the south; Juniper Preserve (formerly Pronghorn) to the northeast; Eagle Crest Resort west of Redmond; and Black Butte Ranch west of Sisters. These resorts are major employers within the region. In addition, Mount Bachelor ski area operates chairlifts during the winter and spring ski seasons. The Mount Bachelor ski area is one of the largest in the Pacific Northwest, covering 3,683 acres (14.9 km^{2}) with 3,365 feet (1,026 m) of vertical.

=== Tourism ===
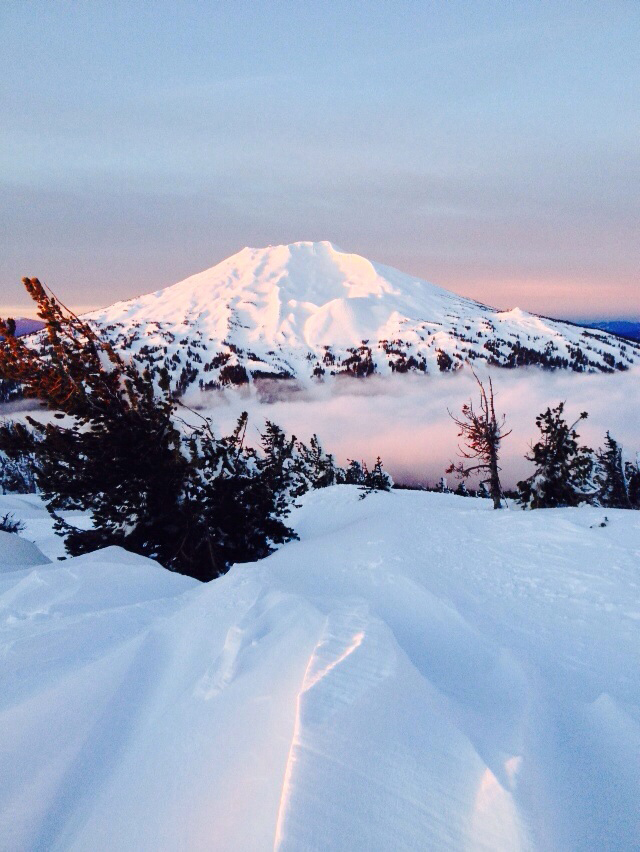
A winter sunrise at Mount Bachelor in Central Oregon.

Central Oregon has a large outdoor tourism industry and it has a reputation for being a dog-friendly vacation destination. Pet-friendly lodging and restaurant options make traveling to Central Oregon pets easy year-round. Central Oregon has 26 breweries that contribute to the growing craft beer scene in Oregon. Some other attractions and activities that are popular are Oregon's Scenic Bikeways, rock climbing at Smith Rock State Park, mountain biking on over 700 miles (1,100 km) of trails, hiking at Cascade Lakes, Deschutes River, Metolius River, Three Sisters, Broken Top crater and other locations, snowsports at Mount Bachelor, water sports such as rafting, kayaking, boating, tubing, paddleboarding, and swimming at hundreds of lakes, rivers, and streams, shopping tax-free at designer boutiques, antique malls and shopping malls, and visiting The Museum at Warm Springs, the High Desert Museum and the Des Chutes Historical Museum as well as viewing displays hosted by various art studios.

Another major draw for visitors is year-round events hosted throughout Central Oregon. There are currently 10 annual craft beer festivals held in Central Oregon: Winterfest in February, Central Oregon Beer Week, Mt. Bachelor's Brewski, and Sunriver Brewfest in May, Sisters Brewfest and The Fermentation Celebration in June, the Bend Brewfest and the Little Woody Barrel Aged Brew Fest in August, and the Bend Oktoberfest and the Sisters Fresh Hop Festival in September. Other events include the Sisters Rodeo, summer concerts at the Hayden Homes Amphitheater, the FairWell Festival at Deschutes County Fairgrounds, Pacific Crest Weekend Sports Festival, The Bite of Bend food festival, Fourth of July bike ride, Munch and Music in Drake Park, Summerfest in Downtown Bend, Riverfest in Maupin, Hoodoo Winter Carnival, the Pole Pedal Paddle, Barks and Recreation Dog Festival in Drake Park, the Sisters Outdoor Quilt Show, the Deschutes County Fair, Art in the High Desert at the Old Mill District, Shakespeare in the Park, Sisters Harvest Faire, and the ongoing First Friday Art Walk downtown Bend and the Old Mill District, Ironworks District Last Saturday Art Walk, and the Bend Farmers Market held Wednesdays downtown Bend from June through October.

The Deschutes National Forest contains about 104 developed campsites. Many of these are right outside Bend off the Cascade Lakes Scenic Byway.

=== Fly fishing ===
Central Oregon has long been a fly-fishing center. In October 2012 Central Oregon hosted the Fly Fishing National Championships. One of the best trout and steelhead fisheries is in the Deschutes River and is one of the most regulated. Bend is a top destination for US anglers and has been named # 1 town for sportsmen. Ponds popular for fly fishing in the area include Shevlin Pond, Bend Pine Nursery Pond, Reynolds Pond, Prineville Youth Pond, Walton Lake, Fireman's Pond, Sprague Pond, and Century Pond.

== Incorporated cities ==
City	Population (2014)	County
Bend	84,080	Deschutes
Culver	1,392	Jefferson
La Pine	1,742	Deschutes
Madras	6,533	Jefferson
Metolius	723	Jefferson
Prineville	9,258	Crook
Redmond	27,491	Deschutes
Sisters	2,224	Deschutes

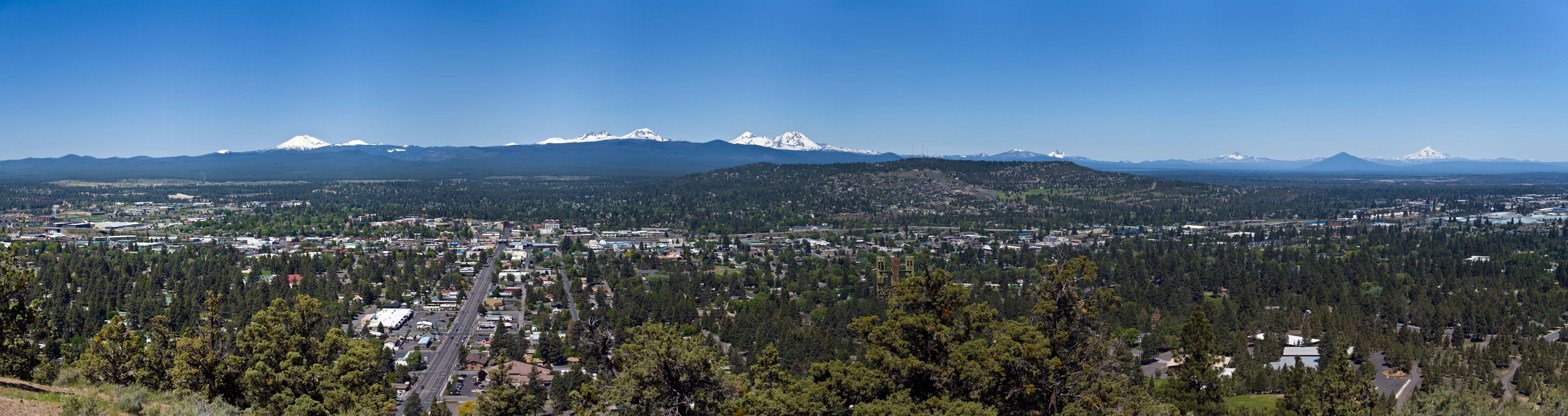
A view from Pilot Butte, looking west at the city of Bend with the Cascade Mountains in the background.

== Politics ==
Presidential election results
Year	DEM	GOP	Others
2020	48.6% 74,156	48.6% 74,122	2.8% 4,317
2016	40.0% 48,061	49.7% 59,686	10.4% 12,441
2012	43.2% 43,366	53.7% 53,895	3.0% 3,044
2008	46.9% 46,133	50.6% 49,837	2.5% 2,482
2004	40.6% 37,446	57.9% 53,349	1.5% 1,419
2000	37.3% 27,216	56.6% 41,333	6.2% 4,510
1996	38.2% 22,313	46.2% 27,019	15.6% 9,134
1992	35.7% 20,362	35.6% 20,320	28.7% 16,413
1988	45.8% 19,329	52.0% 21,983	2.2% 931
1984	37.5% 15,859	62.3% 26,379	0.3% 108
1980	34.2% 13,457	53.0% 20,822	12.8% 5,035
1976	49.3% 13,785	46.4% 12,957	4.3% 1,194
1972	41.9% 9,291	52.9% 11,730	5.2% 1,142
1968	42.7% 7,630	50.4% 8,995	6.9% 1,232
1964	66.8% 11,105	33.1% 5,506	0.0% 8
1960	49.0% 7,995	50.8% 8,290	0.2% 25

Central Oregon is typically close in presidential elections. No presidential candidate has won Central Oregon with more than 60% of the vote since Ronald Reagan in 1984. Historically, Republicans have most often won the region, however, in 2020, Democrat Joe Biden won it by just 34 votes.
