= Redmond School District =

School district in Oregon, USA

District information
- Grades: K-12
- Established: 1883
- Superintendent: Mike McIntosh

Students and staff
- Students: 7,000

Other information
- Website: Official Website

The Redmond School District is a school district in the U.S. state of Oregon that serves a 550-square-mile (1,400 km^{2}) area in Deschutes and Jefferson counties, including the city of Redmond and the unincorporated communities of Alfalfa, Crooked River Ranch, Eagle Crest, Terrebonne, and Tumalo. The district has an enrollment of slightly more than 7,000 students.

== History ==
In May 1966, residents in Alfalfa voted to have their school district consolidated as a way of facilitating high school education. In 1966 that district, along with the Cloverdale, Terrebone, and Tumalo districts, were to merge into the Redmond elementary school district.

== Boundary and attendance ==
In Deschutes County, the district includes Redmond, Eagle Crest, Pronghorn, Terrebonne, Tumalo, and all of that county's portion of Crooked River Ranch. It also includes the unincorporated area of Alfalfa.

In Jefferson County, the district includes most of that county's portion of Crooked River Ranch.

From 1967 to 1992, it was designated to receive high school students from the Sisters School District.

== Schools ==
The district operates 10 schools, an educational center, and a charter school.

Elementary schools

- John Tuck Elementary School (K–5)
- M.A. Lynch Elementary School (K–5)
- Sage Elementary School (K–5)
- Tom McCall Elementary School (K–5)
- Vern Patrick Elementary School (K–5)

Community schools

- Terrebonne Community School (K–5)
- Tumalo Community School (K–8)

Middle schools

- Elton Gregory Middle School (6–8)
- Obsidian Middle School (6–8)

High schools

- Redmond High School (9–12)
- Ridgeview High School (9-12)
- Redmond Proficiency Academy (6-12)

Educational center

- Edwin Brown Educational Center

=== Former schools ===
- Alfalfa School - Closed in 1987
- Evergreen Elementary School - Closed in 2010.

== See also ==
- List of school districts in Oregon
