= Tumalo Irrigation Project =

The Tumalo Irrigation Project was a privately funded corporation begun to provide water to late-19th century farms in the area of Tumalo Creek, Oregon. The Three Sisters Irrigation Company and its successors owned and managed the project, under the provisions of the Carey Act. Controversy arose when corporate investors engaged in land speculation rather than irrigation construction. In 1912, during the administration of Governor Oswald West, the state of Oregon assumed control of the project. By 1913 the work was terminated and the work camp abandoned.
