= Terrebonne, Oregon =

Unincorporated community in the state of Oregon, United States

- Census-designated place
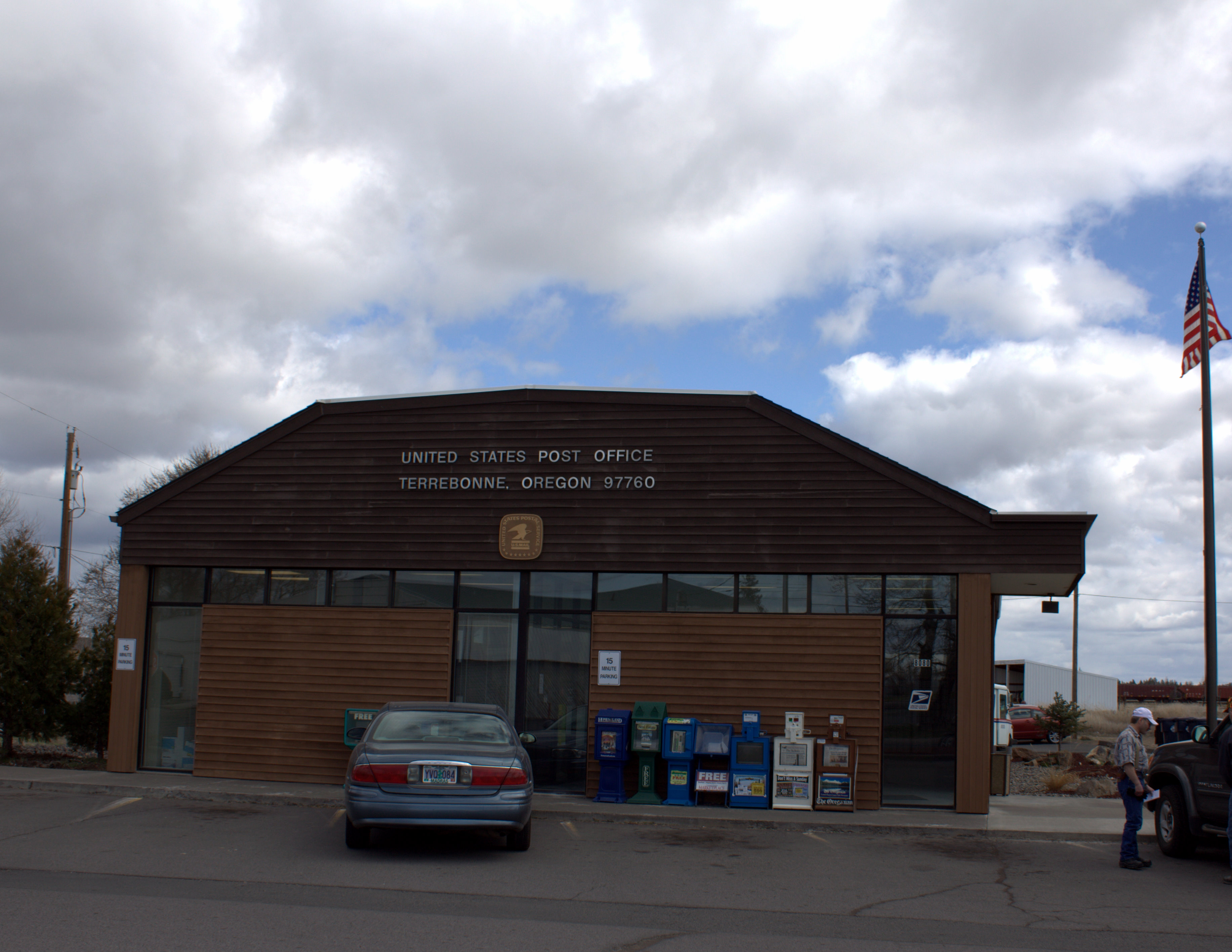
- Post office in Terrebonne

- Location of Terrebonne, Oregon
- Coordinates: 44°21′12″N 121°10′51″W
- Country: United States
- State: Oregon
- County: Deschutes

Area
  - Total: 1.02 sq mi (2.63 km^{2})
  - Land: 1.02 sq mi (2.63 km^{2})
  - Water: 0 sq mi (0.00 km^{2})
- Elevation: 2,874 ft (876 m)

Population (2020)
  - Total: 1,393
  - Density: 1,372.1/sq mi (529.79/km^{2})
- Time zone: UTC-8 (Pacific (PST))
  - Summer (DST): UTC-7 (PDT)
- ZIP code: 97760
- FIPS code: 41-72800
- GNIS feature ID: 2410070

Terrebonne is an unincorporated community and census-designated place (CDP) in Deschutes County, Oregon, United States. It is part of the Bend, Oregon Metropolitan Statistical Area. As of the 2020 census, Terrebonne had a population of 1,393.

== Geography ==
Terrebonne is located in northeastern Deschutes County along U.S. Route 97. It is 6 miles (10 km) north of Redmond, 24 miles (39 km) north of Bend, the county seat, and 20 miles (32 km) south of Madras. According to the United States Census Bureau, the CDP has a total area of 1.0 square mile (2.6 km^{2}), all land, a reduction from 4.5 square miles (12 km^{2}) at the 2000 census.

=== Climate ===
This region experiences warm (but not hot) and dry summers, with no average monthly temperatures above 71.6 °F. According to the Köppen Climate Classification system, Terrebonne has a warm-summer Mediterranean climate, abbreviated "Csb" on climate maps.

== Demographics ==
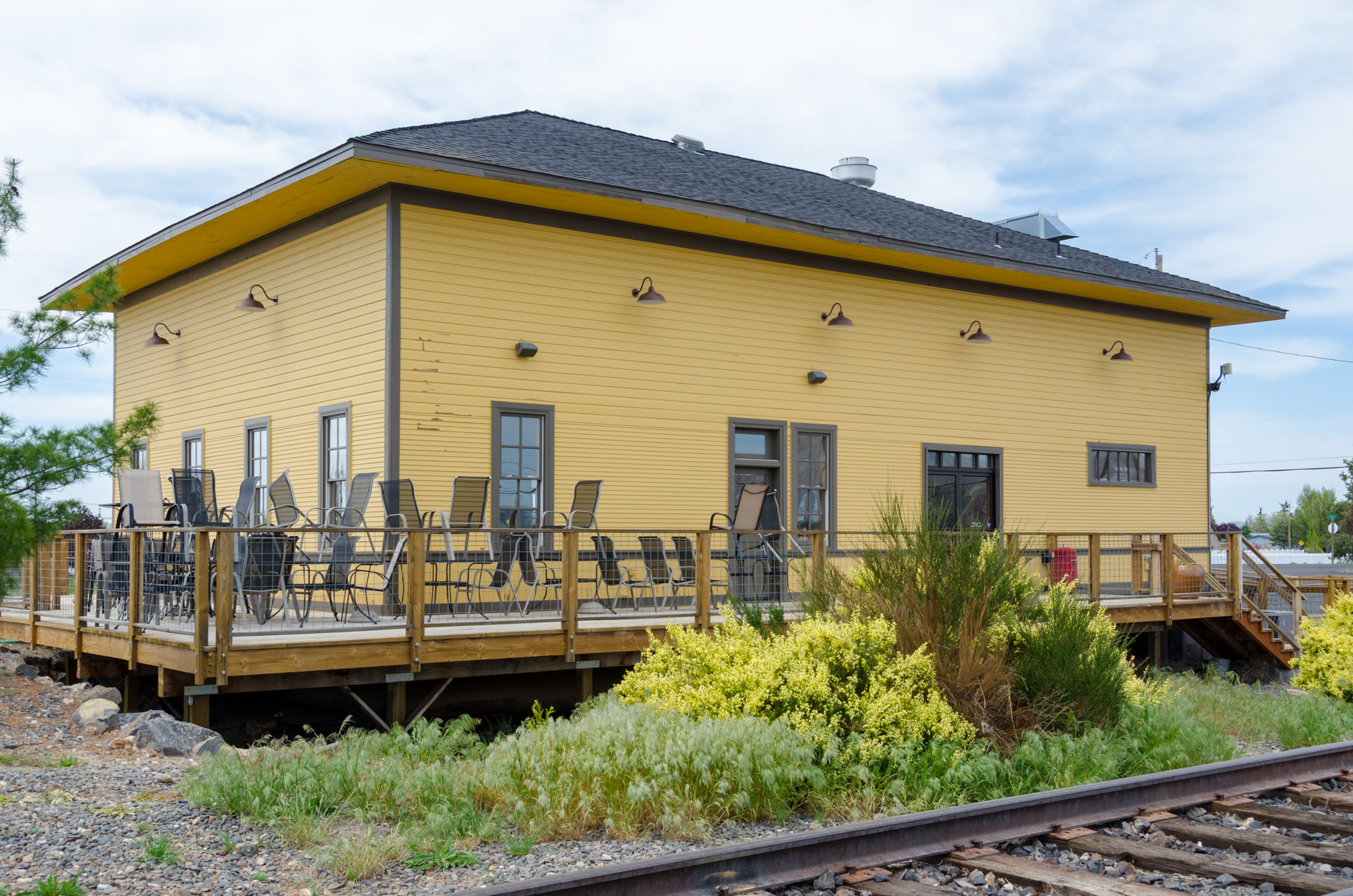
A restaurant in Terrebonne, in a former train station

As of the census of 2000, there were 1,469 people, 531 households, and 409 families residing in the CDP. The population density was 325.3 inhabitants per square mile (125.6/km^{2}). There were 561 housing units at an average density of 124.2 per square mile (48.0/km^{2}). The racial makeup of the CDP was 94.49% White, 0.07% African American, 0.95% Native American, 0.14% Asian, 2.18% from other races, and 2.18% from two or more races. Hispanic or Latino of any race were 4.56% of the population.

Historical population
Census	Pop.	Note	%±
1930	75		—
1950	198		—
1960	378		90.9%
1970	521		37.8%
1980	900		72.7%
1990	1,143		27.0%
2000	1,469		28.5%
2010	1,257		−14.4%
2020	1,393		10.8%

There were 531 households, out of which 35.8% had children under the age of 18 living with them, 64.6% were married couples living together, 7.5% had a female householder with no husband present, and 22.8% were non-families. 20 3% of all households were made up of individuals, and 7.3% had someone living alone who was 65 years of age or older. The average household size was 2.76 and the average family size was 3.13.

In the CDP, the population was spread out, with 28.4% under the age of 18, 5.4% from 18 to 24, 27.2% from 25 to 44, 26.7% from 45 to 64, and 12.3% who were 65 years of age or older. The median age was 39 years. For every 100 females, there were 108.7 males. For every 100 females age 18 and over, there were 100.0 males.

The median income for a household in the CDP was $37,674, and the median income for a family was $49,375. Males had a median income of $26,359 versus $23,476 for females. The per capita income for the CDP was $17,698. About 3.9% of families and 7.6% of the population were below the poverty line, including 4.2% of those under age 18 and 14.4% of those age 65 or over.

== Point of Interest ==
- Smith Rock State Park

== Education ==
It is in the Redmond School District 2J. The zoned schools are: Terrebonne Elementary School, Elton Gregory Middle School, and Redmond High School.

In previous eras, there was a Terrebonne elementary school district. In 1966, the Terrebonne district, among others, was to merge into the Redmond elementary school district.

Deschutes County is in the boundary of Central Oregon Community College.
