= Redmond High School (Oregon) =

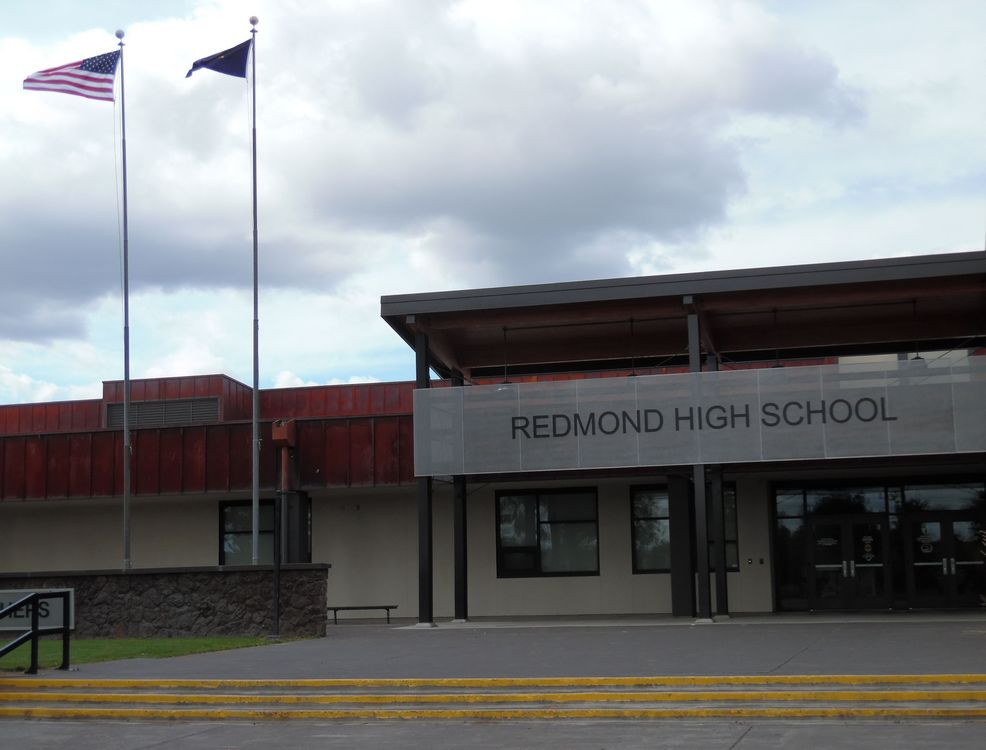

Location
- 675 SW Rimrock Drive; Redmond, Oregon 97756; United States; 44.27140°N 121.19061°W

Information
- Type: Public
- Motto: Graduating Every Student, College and Career Ready
- Established: 1914
- School district: Redmond School District
- NCES School ID: 411035000282
- Principal: Audrey Haugan
- Teaching staff: 48.31 (on an FTE basis)
- Grades: 9-12
- Enrollment: 939 (2023-2024)
- Student to teacher ratio: 19.44
- Colors: Maroon and gold
- Athletics conference: OSAA Intermountain 5A
- Mascot: Peter The Panther
- Team name: Panther
- Yearbook: The Juniper
- Website: rhs.redmondschools.org

Redmond High School (RHS) is a public high school in Redmond, Oregon, United States. It is a part of the Redmond School District.

The high school's attendance boundary includes parts of Redmond, as well as Terrebonne and much of Crooked River Ranch.

== History ==
In 1967 the Sisters School District closed Sisters High School, and it began sending high school students to Redmond High. At the time, the school operated an early set of classes which juniors and seniors could take; such students taking them could then leave school earlier than other students. The school, in fall 1967, was to set a bus schedule to Sisters where there was a main bus, and a bus for juniors and seniors taking early classes.

In 1992 Sisters High School was to reopen. At the time, the number of students at Redmond High School was increasing. Sisters-based students who were scheduled to be in the 12th grade in the 1992-1993 school year could stay at Redmond High if they wished, and students scheduled to be in the 11th grade could have potentially done so if they argued that their academic progress would be hindered by switching schools. All students who were to be sophomores at that time were required to move to Sisters High.

== Notable alumni ==
- Les AuCoin, former U.S. congressman
- Maarty Leunen, basketball player
- Tom McCall, Oregon governor 1967–1974
- Arthur Tuck, athlete
- Jed Weaver, professional football player
