= Eagle Crest Resort =

Eagle Crest
- Resort; Census-designated place
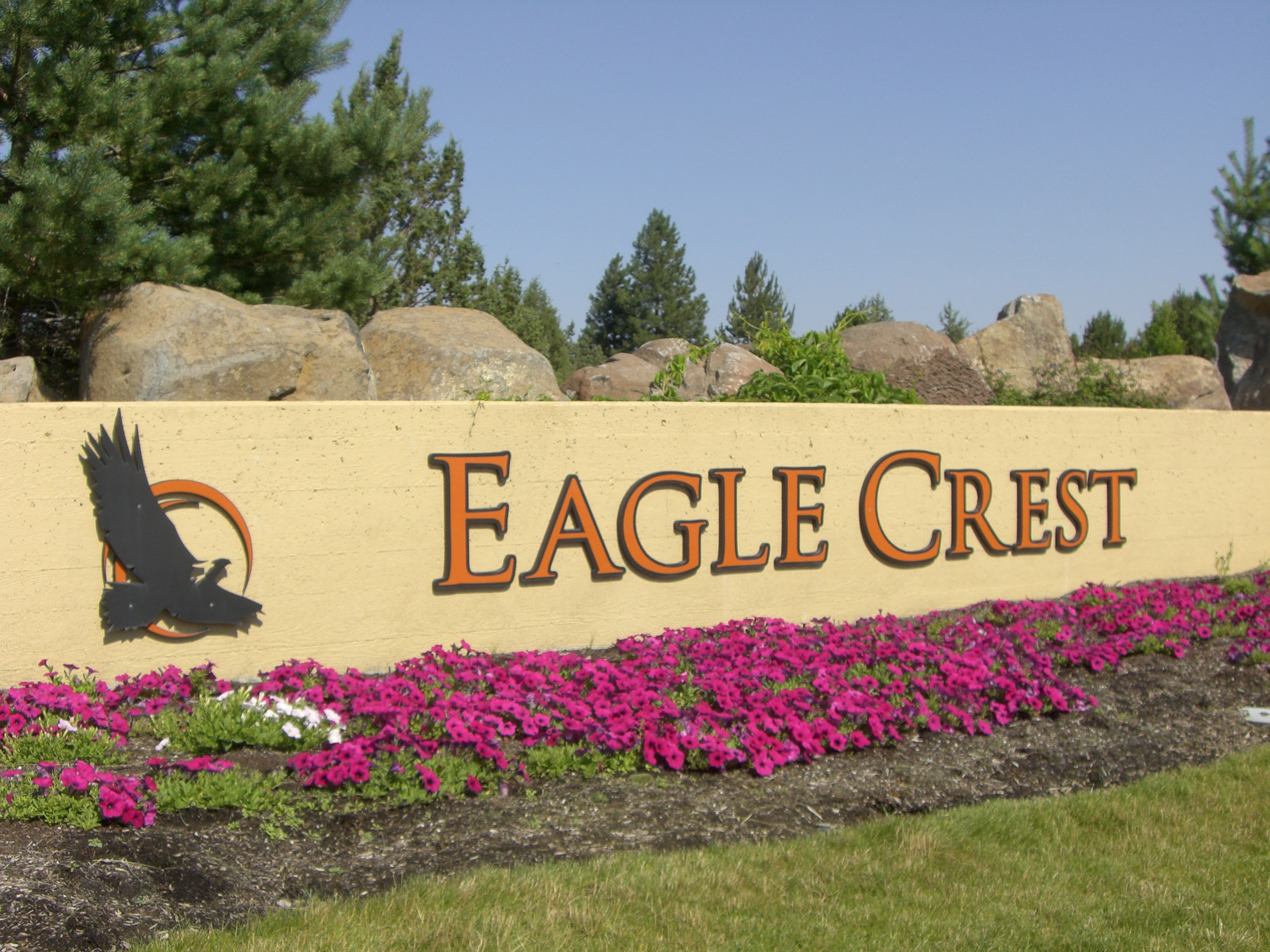

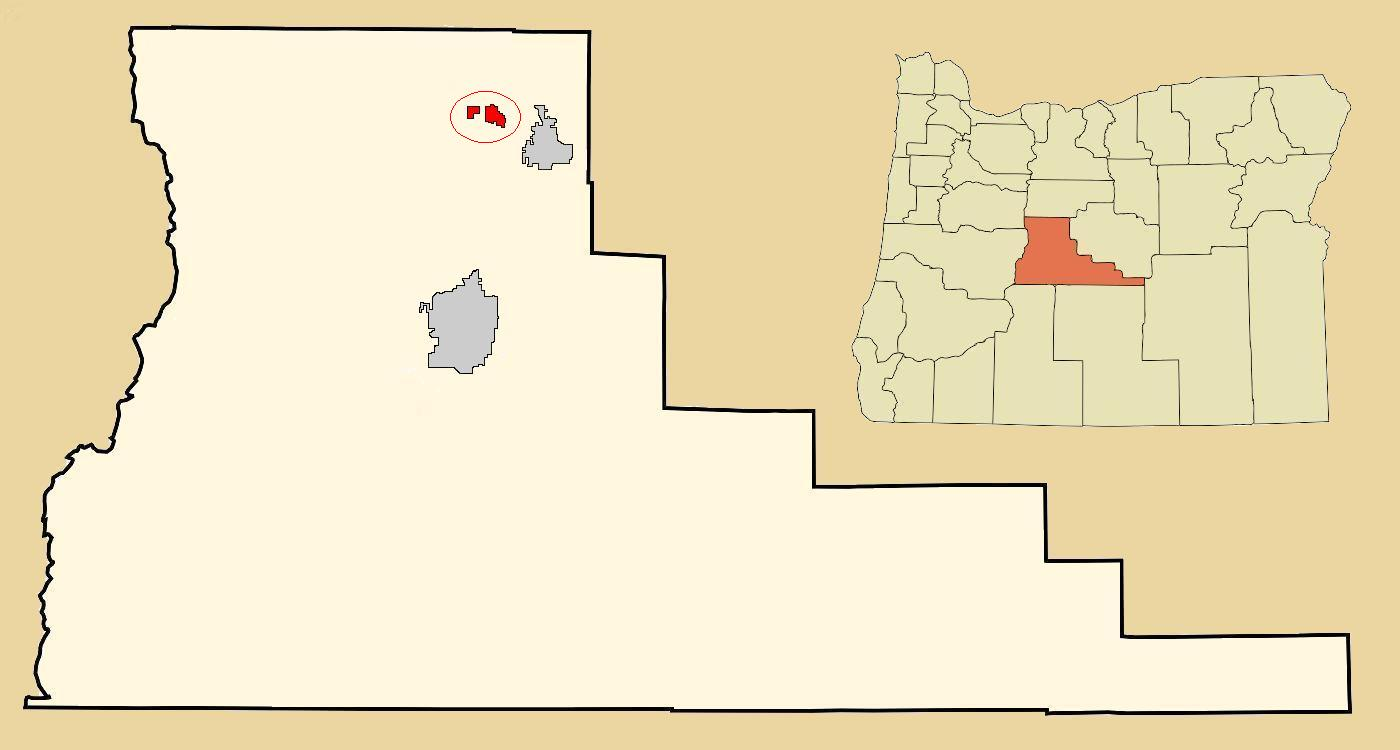
- Coordinates: 44°15′20″N 121°15′50″W
- Country: United States
- State: Oregon
- County: Deschutes
- Established: 1985

Area
  - Total: 15.19 sq mi (39.35 km^{2})
  - Land: 15.19 sq mi (39.35 km^{2})
  - Water: 0 sq mi (0.00 km^{2})
- Elevation: 3,622 ft (1,104 m)

Population (2020)
  - Total: 2,761
  - Density: 181.7/sq mi (70.16/km^{2})
- Time zone: UTC-8 (Pacific)
  - Summer (DST): UTC-7 (Pacific)
- ZIP code: 97756
- FIPS code: 41-21450
- GNIS feature ID: 2584414
- Website: www.eagle-crest.com

Eagle Crest is a census-designated place in the U.S. state of Oregon. It is a resort area with a hotel, conference center, three golf courses, and three major housing developments each with multiple subdivisions. The resort is located west of Redmond in Central Oregon. The development covers 1,700 acres (6.9 km^{2}) on the east slopes of Cline Buttes running eastward to the Deschutes River plus a separate area on the northwest side of the butte.

The resort and the area around had a residential population of 1,696 at the 2010 census. The 2020 census count was 2,761.

== Geography ==
Eagle Crest is located 6 miles (10 km) west of Redmond on west side of the Deschutes River. The Eagle Crest property includes the lower slope of Cline Butte on the eastern side, extending approximately one and a half miles to the Deschutes River, and one and a half miles north to south with Oregon Highway 126 as the northern boundary. The resort's main entrance is just off the Cline Falls Highway, approximately one mile south of Highway 126. In addition to the resort's main area east of Cline Butte, there is a large, separate parcel of Eagle Crest property northwest of the butte. This area has an entrance road connecting it directly to Highway 126. In total, Eagle Crest covers 1,700 acres (6.9 km^{2}).

The Eagle Crest CDP covers the area of the resort and surrounding land for a total area of 15.2 square miles (39.4 km^{2}), all of it land.

The portion of Eagle Crest east of Cline Butte is located on the Matson Plateau. This area is generally flat with gentle swales sloping gradually down hill to the east until it reaches the edge of the Deschutes River canyon. Most of the area, around Cline Butte, including all of Eagle Crest, is western juniper woodland. In addition to juniper, there are also some native stands of lodgepole pine in the area. The area's ground cover is dominated by bitterbrush, sagebrush, gray rabbitbrush, and other high desert plants. The plateau ends at the cliff edge just above the Deschutes River. The river flows through a deep canyon with 100-foot (30 m) high basalt cliffs on both sides. Eagle Crest owns approximately one and a half miles of Deschutes River frontage on the west bank.

== Demographics ==
Historical population
| Census | Pop. | Note | %± |
|---|---|---|---|
| 2020 | 2,761 | | — |
U.S. Decennial Census

== Resort ==
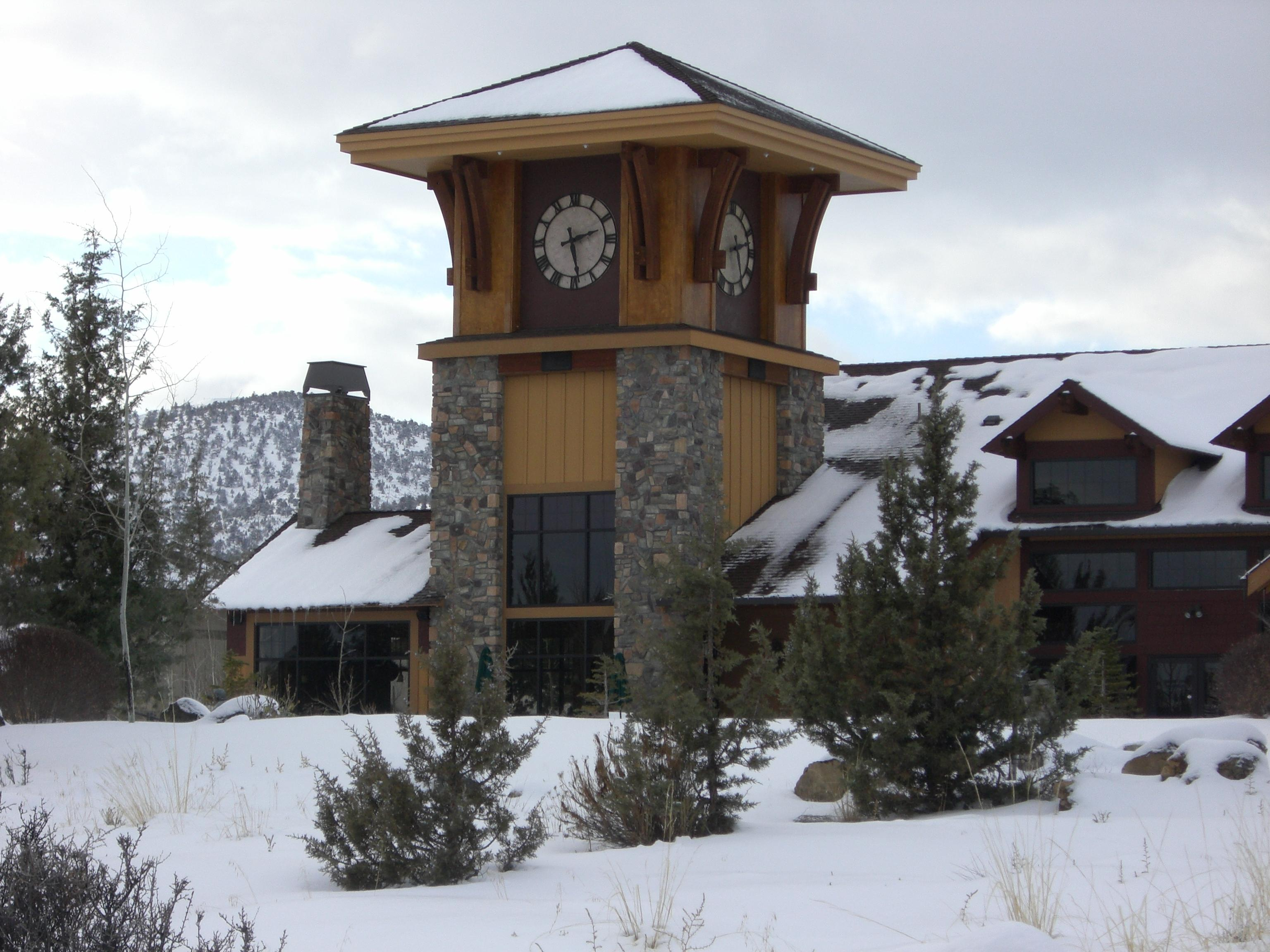
Eagle Crest clock tower with Cline Butte in the background

The Eagle Crest is one of eight destination resorts as defined by Oregon's Department of Land Conservation and Development. Built in 1989, the Inn at Eagle Crest is located next to one of the resort's three golf courses. There are 100 rooms in the main hotel and 80 condominium units that are part of the resort's lodging facility. Many of its guest rooms have decks or patios facing the golf course. Smith Rock, located 9 miles (14 km) north of Redmond, is northeast of the resort and can be seen from many of the rooms. A large number of the condominiums overlook the Deschutes River canyon. The resort also operates a large conference center, three 18-hole golf courses, spa facilities, two sports and fitness centers, three outdoor pools, an indoor pool, and numerous other amenities. The resort has 13 miles (21 km) of paved paths for biking, jogging, and walks. There are also hiking trails running 2 miles (3 km) along the west bank of the Deschutes River as well as a 2 miles (3 km) loop around Cline Butte.

The Eagle Crest conference center is located adjacent to the Inn at Eagle Crest. It is a 10,000-square-foot (930 m^{2}) facility with two separate conference areas. The larger area, Juniper Hall, can accommodate 600 people for lectures or 425 banquet guests. The other conference area is the Golden Eagle Ballroom, which accommodates 511 people in a theatre configuration or 360 when arranged for banquets. Both the hall and the ballroom can be divided into smaller meeting rooms. This allows the center to handle as many as six smaller conferences, meeting, lectures, receptions, or luncheons at one time.

Jeld-Wen, a wood product company that entered the resort business in the 1980s, sold the resort portion of Eagle Crest to Northview Hotel Group in 2010. Northview’s purchase was financed Oaktree Capital Management. Over the next few years, Northview invested approximately $3 million in facility upgrades. In early 2018, Northview sold the resort to a Florida company, KDG Capital. After the sale, management responsibility for the resort was transferred to Aimbridge Hospitality, a hotel and hospitality management firm headquartered in Texas. As of 2018, the resort property included a 100-room hotel, a convention center, three golf courses, two club houses, and three health and fitness centers.

== Golf courses ==
The resort's three golf courses are well known and popular. The Resort Course, adjacent to the Inn, is the resort's original golf course. It is an 18-hole, 6,673 yards, par-72 course designed by Gene Mason. The course runs along the rim of the Deschutes River canyon and throughout the original Eagle Crest housing development. The most spectacular holes follow the cliffs overlooking the river, 100 feet (30 m) below. The Ridge Course was designed by John Thronson.It is an 18-hole, 6,927 yard, par-72 course that threads its way through native juniper trees with the Cascade Mountains in the background. The Oregon Open golf tournament has been held at the Ridge Course. The Challenge Course is an 18-hole par-63; however, it only covers 4,160 yards so it can be played in about three hours. It offers four tee boxes at each hole so the course is popular with beginners as well as experienced golfers. All three courses are open from mid-March through the first week in November. The Ridge course is kept open year around, weather permitting.

== Housing developments ==
Eagle Crest housing was developed in three phases. The original resort development was begun in 1985. It included individual home sites in a gated community along with condominiums and townhouse units in Riverview Vista Estates and Fairway Vista Estates. These areas are all on the east side of the Cline Falls Highway, between the Inn and the Deschutes River. Most are located along the fairways of the Resort golf course or overlooking the Deschutes River canyon. These three areas together are known as the Resort development.

In 1996, Eagle Crest began selling lots west of the Cline Falls Highway in the area of the Ridge golf course, which was completed in 1993. This second phase of development is known as The Ridge. This area continued to grow as the Challenge golf course was built in 1999. Eagle Crest continued to sell housing lots in the ridge area for over a decade, construction of new homes was still going on in 2020 and there are over 1,750 occupied units in The Ridge.

There are five distinct subdivisions in the second phase Eagle Crest development known as The Ridge: Forest Greens (108 units), Eagle Springs (21 units), Forest Ridge (48 units), Eagle Creek (148 units), and The Falls, a community with 203 homesites specifically for retired adults, 55 or older. The Falls has its own community center and private fitness center.

The third and final phase of Eagle Crest housing includes six distinct areas located northwest of Cline Butte. This area is separated from the Ridge area by approximately one mile of Bureau of Land Management property. However, there is a paved easement road that connects the two areas. The largest subdivision in this area is known as the West Ridge. The West Ridge development covers the lower slope of Cline Butte and has approximately 425 lots for standalone homes. The Creekside subdivision has 216 townhouses located near the West Ridge sports center. The Highland Park area has 41 smaller lots. There are 113 lots in the Desert Sky subdivision. Houses in the Desert Sky area are all built in the western ranch style. Vista Rim was the last subdivision developed at Eagle Crest. The 51 lots in that area began selling in 2008. There is also a small gated area with eight 1-acre (4,000 m^{2}) properties called Scenic Ridge. These high-end properties are located on the western edge of the Eagle Crest with views of all the Cascade Mountains from Mount Bachelor to Mount Hood.

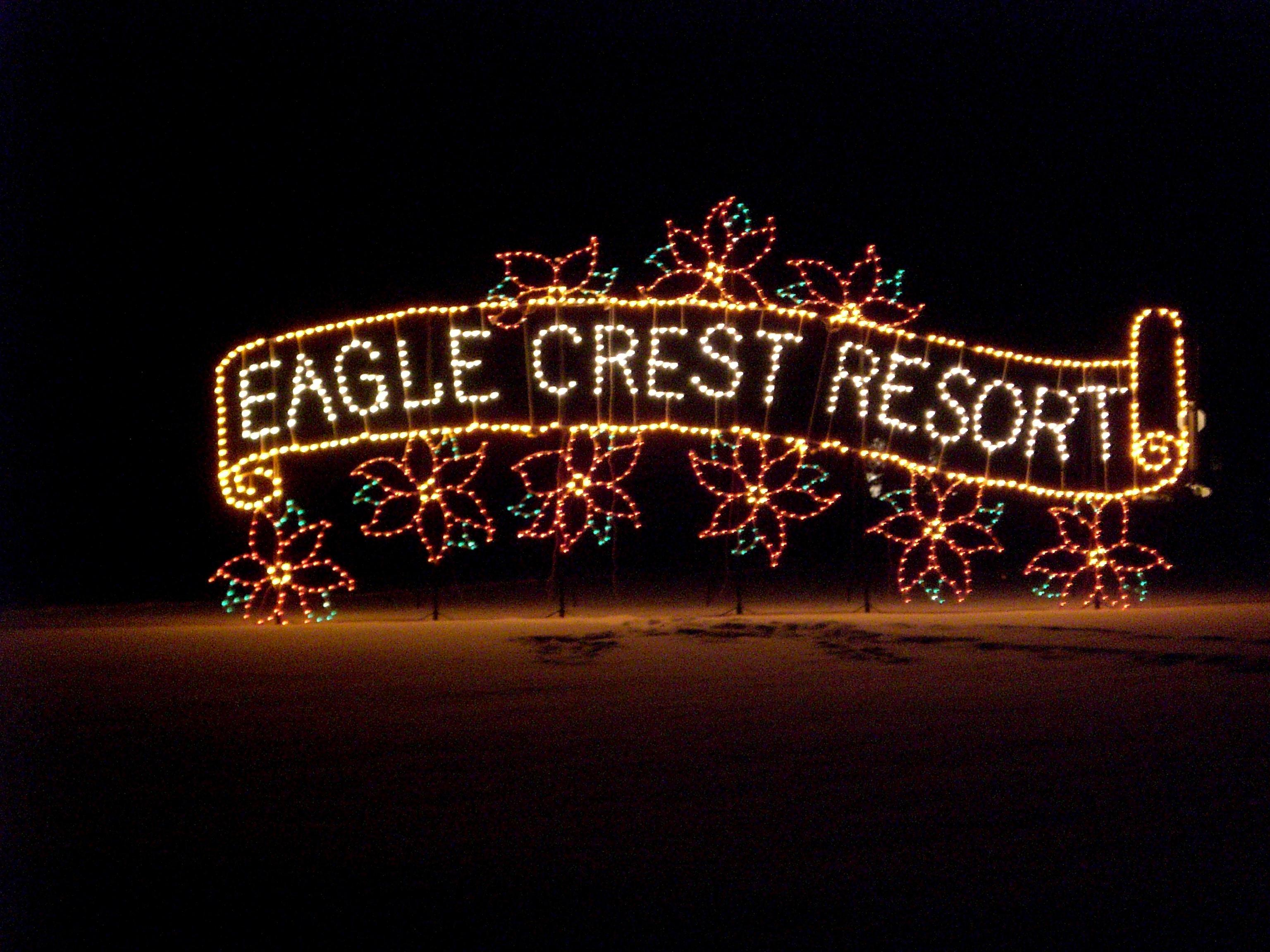
Entrance to StarFest light display at Eagle Crest Resort

In the 2010 United States census, Eagle Crest was designated as a new Census Designated Place. As a result, Eagle Crest now has an official population count. As of 2010, the year-round population of Eagle Crest is 1,696 residents.

== Education ==
It is in the Redmond School District 2J. School zoning is as follows: Most of the area is zoned to Tumalo Elementary School while portions are zoned to Sage Elementary School. All of it is zoned to Obsidian Middle School and Ridgeview High School.

Deschutes County is in the boundary of Central Oregon Community College.

== StarFest ==
Each winter Eagle Crest Resort hosts StarFest, a night-time light display along a 1-mile (1.6 km) drive through the resort. In 2023, it began on Thanksgiving and ran through December 21. During StarFest, the Inn at Eagle Crest offers visitors coffee, hot cocoa, and cookies along with a fireside story time with Mrs. Claus.
