= Redmond, Oregon =

- City
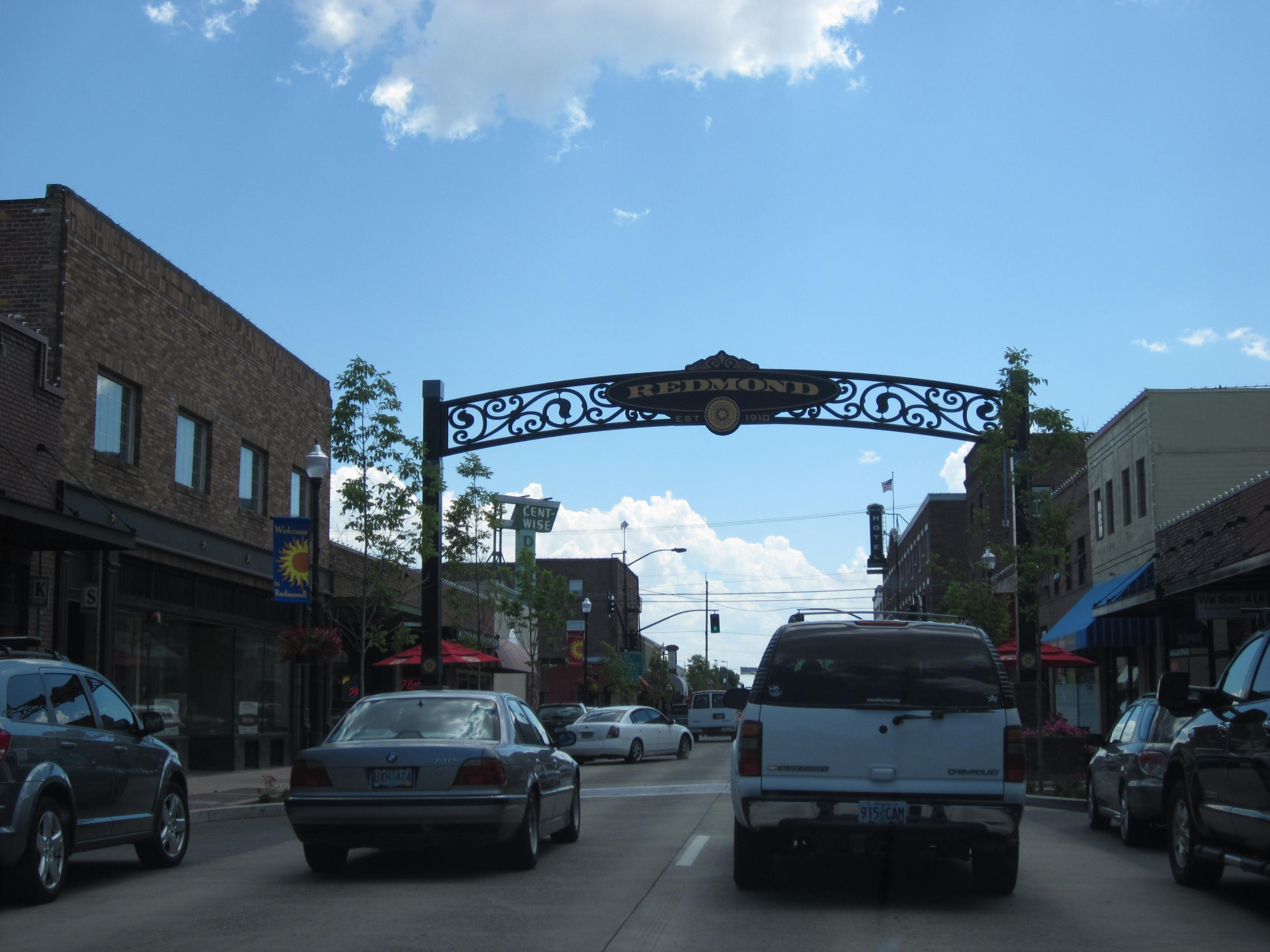
- Business Highway 97 in Redmond

- Seal
- Nicknames: The Hub and Central Plaza
- Motto: The Heart of Central Oregon
- Location in Redmond in Deschutes County, Oregon
- Coordinates: 44°15′21″N 121°11′02″W
- Country: United States
- State: Oregon
- County: Deschutes
- Founded: 1904
- Incorporated: July 6, 1910

Government
  - Type: Council–manager_government
  - Mayor: Ed Fitch

Area
  - City: 18.638 sq mi (48.271 km^{2})
  - Land: 18.636 sq mi (48.268 km^{2})
  - Water: 0.0012 sq mi (0.003 km^{2})
- Elevation: 3,012 ft (918 m)

Population (2020)
  - City: 33,274
  - Estimate (2023): 37,009
  - Density: 1,983/sq mi (765.6/km^{2})
  - Urban: 33,293
  - Metro: 260,919
- Time zone: UTC–8 (Pacific (PST))
  - Summer (DST): UTC–7 (PDT)
- ZIP Code: 97756
- Area codes: 541 and 458
- FIPS code: 41-61200
- GNIS feature ID: 2411533
- Website: redmondoregon.gov

Redmond is a city in Deschutes County, Oregon, United States. The population was 33,274 at the 2020 census, and according to 2023 census estimates, the city is estimated to have a population of 37,009.

The city is on the eastern side of Oregon's Cascade Range, in the High Desert in Central Oregon. From Redmond there is access to recreational opportunities. Redmond is a full-service municipality and one of the fastest-growing industrial and residential communities in Oregon.

== History ==
Incorporated on July 6, 1910.

Redmond was named after Frank T. Redmond, who settled in the area in 1905. It was platted in 1906 by a company which would become part of Central Oregon Irrigation District building a canal.

Redmond, Oregon in about 1943

Electrification and the Oregon Trunk Railway reached Redmond in 1911. The rail link opened markets for farmers and merchants. By 1930, the town had grown to 1,000 and by 1940 had nearly doubled. In the 1940s, Redmond was a U.S. Army Air base and commercial air service was established at Roberts Field after World War II. From the 1950s through most of the 1980s, the population remained relatively static, growing slowly around a small commercial/retail center and manufacturing industry. However, during the 1990s, the population began to grow along with most of Deschutes County. Between 2000 and 2006, Redmond's population grew 74.3%, placing it among Oregon's fastest-growing cities each year. This growth continued through 2006, increasing the population to 23,500. Its growth is fueled by employment and a lower cost of living.

== Geography ==
According to the United States Census Bureau, the city has a total area of 18.637 square miles (48.27 km^{2}), of which 18.636 square miles (48.27 km^{2}) is land and 0.001 square miles (0.00 km^{2}) is water.

Redmond is 17 miles (27 km) north of Bend—the county seat of Deschutes County—146 miles (235 km) from Portland, 129 miles (208 km) from Salem—the capital of Oregon—and 126 miles (203 km) from Eugene.

The Horse Lava Tube System enters the city at the point of the Redmond Caves. The lava flow that created the system continues into the Redmond Canyon to Crooked River Ranch.

== Climate ==
Redmond's climate is typical of the high desert with cool nights and sunny days. Annual precipitation averages between 8 and 10 inches (200 and 250 mm), with an average annual snowfall of 24 inches (61 cm). The winter season in Redmond provides typical daytime temperatures between 10 °F (−12 °C) and 40 °F (4 °C). Average nighttime temperatures range anywhere from 0 °F (−18 °C) to 40 °F (4 °C). According to the USDA Plant Hardiness Zone Map, the average annual extreme minimum temperature in Redmond is −5 °F (−21 °C) to −10 °F (−23 °C).

A typical Central Oregon summer is marked with daily temperatures around 75 °F (24 °C) to 100 °F (38 °C) during the day, and around 40 °F (4 °C) to 60 °F (16 °C) during the night. Hard frosts happen on occasion during the summer months. Autumn usually brings warm, dry days and cooler nights. According to the Western Regional Climate Center of the Desert Research Institute, the mean of the monthly average maximum temperatures in July, the hottest month in Redmond, between 1928 and 2006 was 82.09 °F (27.83 °C).

Redmond's growing season is short. According to the U.S. Department of Agriculture's National Resources Conservation Service, in half of the years between 1971 and 2000, the USDA weather station in Redmond recorded the last below-freezing temperatures after July 3 and the first below-freezing temperatures before August 31. Redmond has a steppe climate (BSk) according to the Köppen climate classification system.

Climate data for Redmond, Oregon (Roberts Field) (1991–2020 normals, extremes 1898, 1948–present)
Month	Jan	Feb	Mar	Apr	May	Jun	Jul	Aug	Sep	Oct	Nov	Dec	Year
Record high °F (°C)	70 (21)	74 (23)	81 (27)	89 (32)	99 (37)	112 (44)	109 (43)	119 (48)	106 (41)	95 (35)	80 (27)	72 (22)	119 (48)
Mean maximum °F (°C)	59.8 (15.4)	62.2 (16.8)	70.5 (21.4)	78.6 (25.9)	86.9 (30.5)	93.4 (34.1)	99.2 (37.3)	98.7 (37.1)	93.7 (34.3)	82.0 (27.8)	68.6 (20.3)	57.4 (14.1)	100.8 (38.2)
Mean daily maximum °F (°C)	44.2 (6.8)	48.0 (8.9)	54.9 (12.7)	60.2 (15.7)	69.1 (20.6)	77.2 (25.1)	87.5 (30.8)	86.5 (30.3)	78.6 (25.9)	64.5 (18.1)	50.8 (10.4)	42.3 (5.7)	63.6 (17.6)
Daily mean °F (°C)	34.8 (1.6)	36.6 (2.6)	41.3 (5.2)	45.5 (7.5)	53.4 (11.9)	60.0 (15.6)	68.0 (20.0)	66.8 (19.3)	59.6 (15.3)	48.6 (9.2)	39.1 (3.9)	32.8 (0.4)	48.9 (9.4)
Mean daily minimum °F (°C)	25.3 (−3.7)	25.3 (−3.7)	27.7 (−2.4)	30.7 (−0.7)	37.8 (3.2)	42.8 (6.0)	48.5 (9.2)	47.2 (8.4)	40.6 (4.8)	32.7 (0.4)	27.5 (−2.5)	23.3 (−4.8)	34.1 (1.2)
Mean minimum °F (°C)	5.6 (−14.7)	6.3 (−14.3)	13.3 (−10.4)	17.4 (−8.1)	23.1 (−4.9)	29.2 (−1.6)	35.9 (2.2)	35.0 (1.7)	26.5 (−3.1)	15.4 (−9.2)	7.3 (−13.7)	1.8 (−16.8)	−6.3 (−21.3)
Record low °F (°C)	−27 (−33)	−19 (−28)	−1 (−18)	10 (−12)	12 (−11)	24 (−4)	28 (−2)	25 (−4)	16 (−9)	−3 (−19)	−19 (−28)	−28 (−33)	−28 (−33)
Average precipitation inches (mm)	0.98 (25)	0.66 (17)	0.58 (15)	0.71 (18)	1.20 (30)	0.64 (16)	0.40 (10)	0.46 (12)	0.37 (9.4)	0.68 (17)	0.81 (21)	0.97 (25)	8.46 (215.4)
Average snowfall inches (cm)	4.5 (11)	3.7 (9.4)	1.6 (4.1)	0.3 (0.76)	0.0 (0.0)	0.0 (0.0)	0.0 (0.0)	0.0 (0.0)	0.0 (0.0)	0.1 (0.25)	0.8 (2.0)	4.2 (11)	15.1 (38)
Average precipitation days (≥ 0.01 in)	8.7	7.3	8.2	8.1	7.8	5.5	2.9	2.8	3.4	6.5	8.1	8.7	78.0
Average snowy days (≥ 0.1 in)	2.1	1.7	1.0	0.3	0.0	0.0	0.0	0.0	0.0	0.2	0.8	2.7	8.7
Source: NOAA

== Demographics ==
Historical population
Census	Pop.	Note	%±
1910	216		—
1920	585		170.8%
1930	994		69.9%
1940	1,876		88.7%
1950	2,956		57.6%
1960	3,340		13.0%
1970	3,721		11.4%
1980	6,452		73.4%
1990	7,163		11.0%
2000	13,481		88.2%
2010	26,215		94.5%
2020	33,274		26.9%
2023 (est.)	37,009		11.2%
U.S. Decennial Census; 2020 Census

=== 2020 census ===
As of the 2020 census, there were 33,274 people, 12,686 households, and 8,673 families residing in the city; the population density was 1,822.4 inhabitants per square mile (703.6/km^{2}) and there were 13,262 housing units.

The median age was 36.9 years; 24.0% of residents were under the age of 18 and 17.1% were 65 years of age or older. For every 100 females there were 95.5 males, and for every 100 females age 18 and over there were 92.6 males age 18 and over.

There were 12,686 households in Redmond, of which 33.3% had children under the age of 18 living in them. Of all households, 49.9% were married-couple households, 15.5% were households with a male householder and no spouse or partner present, and 25.5% were households with a female householder and no spouse or partner present. About 22.9% of all households were made up of individuals and 11.4% had someone living alone who was 65 years of age or older.

Among the 13,262 housing units, 4.3% were vacant; 62.3% of occupied units were owner-occupied and 37.7% were renter-occupied. The homeowner vacancy rate was 1.3% and the rental vacancy rate was 4.1%.

99.7% of residents lived in urban areas, while 0.3% lived in rural areas.

Racial composition as of the 2020 census
Race	Number	Percent
White	27,009	81.2%
Black or African American	185	0.6%
American Indian and Alaska Native	386	1.2%
Asian	401	1.2%
Native Hawaiian and Other Pacific Islander	49	0.1%
Some other race	1,908	5.7%
Two or more races	3,336	10.0%
Hispanic or Latino (of any race)	4,645	14.0%

=== 2010 census ===
As of the 2010 census, there were 26,215 people, 9,947 households, and 6,789 families residing in the city. The population density was 1,561.4 inhabitants per square mile (602.9/km^{2}). There were 10,965 housing units at an average density of 653.1 per square mile (252.2/km^{2}). The racial makeup of the city was 89.0% White, 0.4% African American, 1.3% Native American, 0.8% Asian, 0.2% Pacific Islander, 5.4% from other races, and 2.9% from two or more races. Hispanic or Latino of any race were 12.5% of the population.

There were 9,947 households, of which 38.6% had children under the age of 18 living with them, 48.7% were married couples living together, 13.9% had a female householder with no husband present, 5.6% had a male householder with no wife present, and 31.7% were non-families. 24.0% of all households were made up of individuals, and 9.6% had someone living alone who was 65 years of age or older. The average household size was 2.61 and the average family size was 3.07.

The median age in the city was 33.9 years. 27.9% of residents were under the age of 18; 8.8% were between the ages of 18 and 24; 28.8% were from 25 to 44; 21.9% were from 45 to 64; and 12.7% were 65 years of age or older. The gender makeup of the city was 48.3% male and 51.7% female.

=== 2000 census ===
As of the 2000 census, there were 13,481 people, 5,260 households, and 3,618 families residing in the city. The population density was 1,316.7 inhabitants per square mile (508.4/km^{2}). There were 5,584 housing units at an average density of 545.4 per square mile (210.6/km^{2}). The racial makeup was 93.72% White, 0.09% African American, 1.16% Native American, 0.65% Asian, 0.16% Pacific Islander, 2.14% from other races, and 2.08% from two or more races. Hispanic or Latino of any race were 5.48% of the population.

There were 5,260 households, of which 38.1% had children under 18 living with them, 52.2% were married couples living together, 12.2% had a female householder with no husband present, and 31.2% were non-families. 24.6% of all households were of individuals and 10.6% had someone living alone who was 65 or older. The average household size was 2.54 and the average family size 3.02.

In the city, the population was 29.6% under 18, 8.6% from 18 to 24, 30.6% from 25 to 44, 18.3% from 45 to 64, and 13.0% who were 65 or older. The median age was 33. For every 100 females, there were 93.1 males. For every 100 females 18 and over, there were 88.0 males.

The median income for a household was $33,701, and the median income for a family $41,481. Males had a median of $31,940 versus $23,508 for females. The per capita income was $16,286. About 6.6% of families and 9.7% of the population were below the poverty line, including 8.9% of those under 18 and 7.5% of those 65 or over.

== Economy ==
A major employer is Redmond Air Center, at the Redmond Airport. This is a Forest Service smoke-jumping, firefighting and training installation.

T-Mobile USA had a call center in Redmond which employed more than 700. T-Mobile made plans to close this facility in June 2013, but Oregon-based Consumer Cellular moved to sublease the call center and rehire some of T-Mobile's former employees. As of 2012 the Consumer Cellular call center employed more than 200 people, with plans to grow the facility to 650 employees.

The Redmond Spokesman newspaper is the city's oldest continuously operating business, printing its first issue July 14, 1910. Publishers Henry and Clara Palmer moved their press for the Laidlaw Chronicle to Redmond, competing with the existing Oregon Hub and Enterprise newspapers, now defunct.

The Eagle Crest Resort, 6 miles (10 km) west of Redmond, is one of eight destination resorts as defined by Oregon's Department of Land Conservation and Development. Eagle Crest is one of Redmond's major employers, and one of Deschutes County's largest corporate tax payers.

== Education ==
Redmond is served by the Redmond School District and a secondary campus of George Fox University.

== Sports ==
Redmond is the home of the Oregon Lightning who play in Arena Football One, a major arena football league.

== Transportation ==
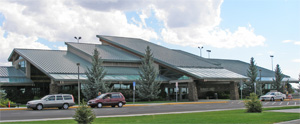
The passenger terminal at Roberts Field in Redmond

=== Air ===
Redmond is home to Roberts Field (Redmond Municipal Airport), the only airport in Central Oregon with commercial passenger service. It also serves the Bend market and is operated by the city government. Roberts Field is the third-busiest commercial airport in Oregon, after Portland and Eugene, and has a terminal with 11 total gates and hardstand spots. As of 2025, the airport is served by four carriers with regional service to West Coast cities: Alaska Airlines, American Airlines, Delta Air Lines, and United Airlines.

The U.S. Forest Service operates an air base and training center for firefighting at Roberts Field. It has been the sole base for firejumpers in Oregon since 1981. Butler Aircraft, a fixed-base operator, flies DC-7 aircraft for firefighting efforts out of Roberts Field.

=== Highways ===
The city lies along U.S. Route 97, a major north–south highway that serves Central Oregon. Through Redmond, it uses an expressway alignment named the Redmond Parkway that opened in 2008. The highway intersects Oregon Route 126, which connects the area to Eugene in the west and Prineville to the east.

=== Rail ===
A BNSF main line runs north–south through the city; there are numerous spurs off of the main line which serve industrial rail customers. The closest Amtrak service is in the town of Chemult, approximately 75 miles (121 km) to the south; this station is served by the Coast Starlight route.

== Points of interest ==
- Deschutes County Fair & Expo Center
- Eagle Crest Resort
- Fairwell Festival
- First Interstate Bank Center
- Redmond Caves
- Smith Rock State Park

== Natural history ==
Some of Redmond's landmark desert flora include:

- The Juniper tree, which dots the surrounding brush/desert
- The Sagebrush, a medium-high bush which is abundant in undeveloped areas

== Notable people ==
- Les AuCoin, a nine-term member of the U.S. House of Representatives from Oregon's First District, grew up in Redmond
- Denton G. Burdick, attorney, state representative, and Speaker of the Oregon House of Representatives
- Sam Johnson, a longtime member of the Oregon House of Representatives, was elected mayor of Redmond in 1979; served until his death in 1984
- Tom McCall, the 30th Governor of Oregon (from 1967 to 1975)
- James F. Short, (1902–1986) businessman, rancher, and state legislator
- Arthur Tuck, an American track and field athlete and Olympian
- Jill Twiss, an American actress, writer and comedian

== See also ==
- Central Oregon
- Bend, Oregon
- Sisters, Oregon
