= Sam Johnson (Oregon politician) =

American politician

Member of the Oregon House of Representatives
- In office 1965–1978
- Succeeded by: Tom Throop
- Constituency: Crook, Deschutes, and Jefferson counties 1965-72; Deschutes and Klamath counties 1973-78

Mayor of Redmond, Oregon
- In office 1979–June 24, 1984
- Succeeded by: Chris Himes

Personal details
- Born: September 1, 1911 Berkeley, California, U.S.
- Died: June 20, 1984 (aged 72) Newport, Rhode Island, U.S.
- Party: Republican
- Spouse: Elizabeth ("Becky") Johnson
- Children: Betsy Johnson, Patti Johnson
- Profession: Plywood manufacturer

Samuel Spencer Johnson (September 1, 1911 – June 20, 1984) was an American businessman, legislator, and philanthropist in the state of Oregon. He owned saw mills and large tracts of timber land near the Metolius River, Black Butte, and Sisters, Oregon. He served seven terms in the Oregon House of Representatives; and along with his wife, founded the Samuel S. Johnson Foundation. He also served as mayor of Redmond, Oregon, from 1979 to 1984.

== Early life ==
Johnson was born on September 1, 1911, in Berkeley, California. He was named after his grandfather, a sawmill owner from Minnesota. His father, Samuel Orie Johnson was a timber broker in California. Around 1903, his father moved to Central Oregon and began acquiring timber land in the area. His father bought what is now Black Butte Ranch, the Indian Ford area near Sisters, most of Green Ridge north of Black Butte, and the Wurzweiller Ranch, which included Camp Sherman and the headwaters of the Metolius River.

After graduating from the University of California at Berkeley's School of Forestry in 1934, Johnson returned to Central Oregon to act as his father's agent, buying and selling timber and land. During that time, Johnson lived in the old Sisters Hotel. In 1935, his father sold the 160 acres (0.65 km^{2}) that included the Metolius headwaters to him for one dollar. In the early 1930s, the Johnsons opened a saw mill in Sisters in partnership with Bert Peterson, the first of six Central Oregon mills the Johnson family owned over the years.

During World War II, Johnson served in the Army Corps of Engineers. As an Army Captain, Johnson ran the Corps of Engineers' procurement office in Portland, Oregon, that bought lumber and wood products from around Oregon and shipped them from the Port of Astoria to Army engineer and Navy Seabee units in the Pacific. While serving in Portland, Captain Johnson met his future wife Elizabeth (known as Becky). She was a Navy recruiter for the Women Accepted for Volunteer Emergency Service (commonly known as WAVES). They married in 1944.

== Businessman ==
After the war, the Johnsons opened a new saw mill in Redmond, Oregon. The mill had direct access to the railroad so the operation could be greatly expanded. In 1948, Johnson bought his father's Oregon timber holdings and mills, and opened his own office in Sisters. Johnson was successful at negotiating timber sale contracts with the United States Forest Service. As a result, his operations continued uninterrupted while many of Central Oregon's saw mills were closing.

In 1967, Johnson sold his Jefferson Plywood Company mill at Warm Springs to the Warm Springs tribal council for $1.34 million and provided additional plywood and veneer-making equipment to help the tribe establish Warm Springs Forest Products Industries. This new tribal business improved the economic conditions on the Warm Springs Reservation.

== Public service ==
In 1965, Johnson was elected to a seat in the Oregon House of Representatives, and was re-elected six more times, serving continuously through the 1977 legislative session. He represented Crook, Deschutes and Jefferson counties from 1965 to 1972, and after re-districting in 1973, he represented Deschutes and Klamath counties. While he was a conservative Republican, he was also a well known champion of progressive government and a mentor to legislators of both parties. He retired from the legislature undefeated in 1978, and ran for mayor of Redmond. He was elected for a two-year term in 1979, and was re-elected in 1981 and 1983, serving in that position until his death in June 1984.

== Legacy ==
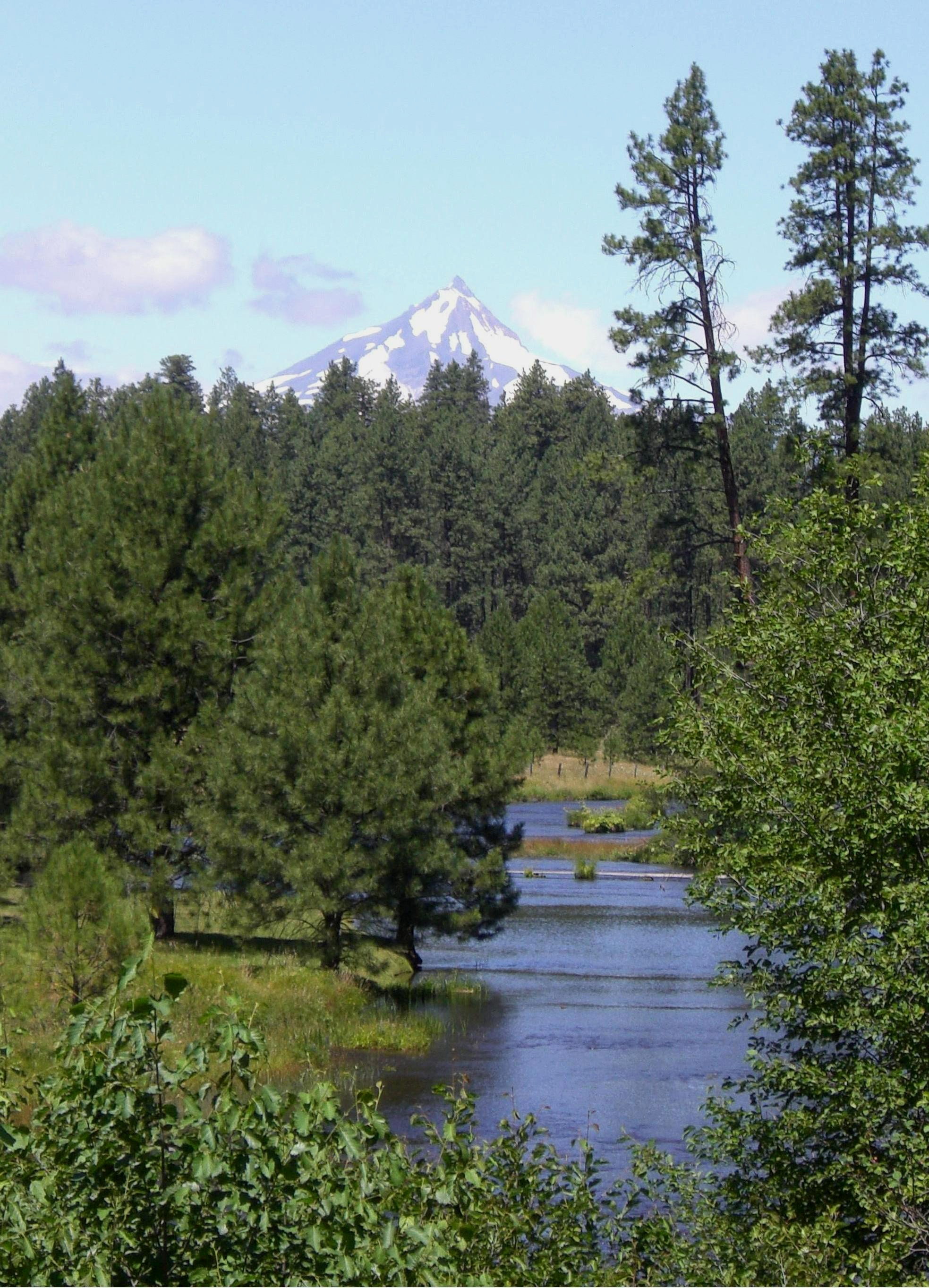
Mt Jefferson and the Metolius River from the Metolius Springs viewing area

Johnson died in 1984 from a heart attack, in Newport, Rhode Island, where he had been attending a seminar.

He and his wife, Becky, established the Samuel S. Johnson Foundation in 1948. Over the years, the Johnson charitable foundation funded numerous projects that fostered respect for nature, history and education. After Sam Johnson's death, his wife continued as the president of the foundation until her death in January 2007. Among the many institutions that have benefited from the foundation are the High Desert Museum, Oregon Historical Society, the Oregon Museum of Science and Industry, and Lewis and Clark College.

Perhaps Sam Johnson's greatest legacy was preserving the headwaters of the Metolius River, also known as Metolius Springs. The headwaters are just north of Black Butte, and are unusual because the Metolius River emerges from an underground volcanic lava tubes as a full flowing river. For many years, the Johnsons allowed public access to the scenic headwaters viewing area. The Johnsons gave the Metolius Springs viewing site to the United States Forest Service in 1965. Today, the area is managed as a Forest Service park.

== Personal ==
The Johnsons had two daughters, Betsy and Patti. Betsy Johnson has served in the Oregon House of Representatives and the Oregon State Senate - as a Democrat representing Columbia County.
