= Metolius =

Metolius is the name of a river in Oregon, USA, the Metolius River.

It may also refer to:

- Metolius Climbing, an American rock climbing gear manufacturer
- Metolius, Oregon, a city in that state named for the river
- Metolius Springs, the headwaters of the Metolius River
