= Wizard Falls =

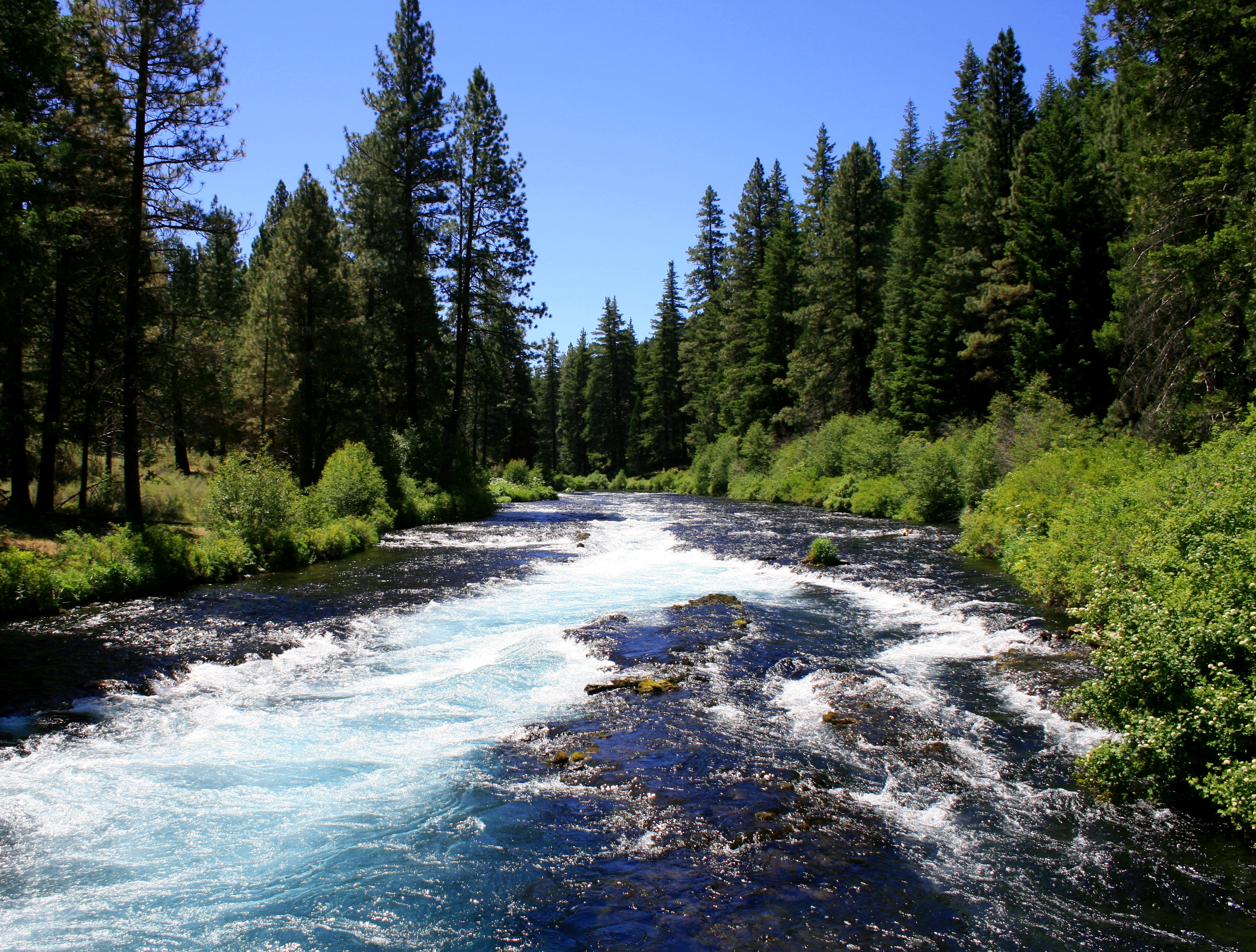
- Metolius River near Wizard Falls
- Interactive map of Wizard Falls
- Location: Willamette National Forest
- Coordinates: 44.51867°N 121.63254°W
- Type: Steep cascade
- Elevation: 2,766 ft (843 m)
- Total height: 12 ft (3.7 m)

Wizard Falls, was a waterfall located in Jefferson County, in the U.S. state of Oregon. It was located in a privileged area on the northwest foothills of Deschutes National Forest, just north of Black Butte and the city of Sisters, Oregon. To the west sits volcano Three Fingered Jack, between Mount Washington to the South and Mount Jefferson to the North.

== History ==
The Wizard Falls Fish Hatchery was constructed in 1948, which required the section of river upstream to be diverted to provide water for the rearing ponds. The process rendered Wizard Falls dry. The waterfall does not flow unless the hatchery is shut down completely for cleaning or maintenance. There is a rapid adjacent to Lower Bridge (also known as bridge 99) along the Metolius River leading to the hatchery, that is often incorrectly assumed to be Wizard Falls.

== Trail ==
Wizard Falls was situated near the Metolius River and totaled 12 ft (3.7 m) in height. The area is the centerpiece attraction of the Wizard Falls trailhead and Recreation Site. The trail follows along Metolius River most of the way. The Wizard Falls fish hatchery is located in the beginning of the trail, as well as the Alder Springs campground and the Pioneer Ford campground.

== See also ==
- List of waterfalls in Oregon
