= Spheroidal weathering =

Form of chemical weathering that affects jointed bedrock

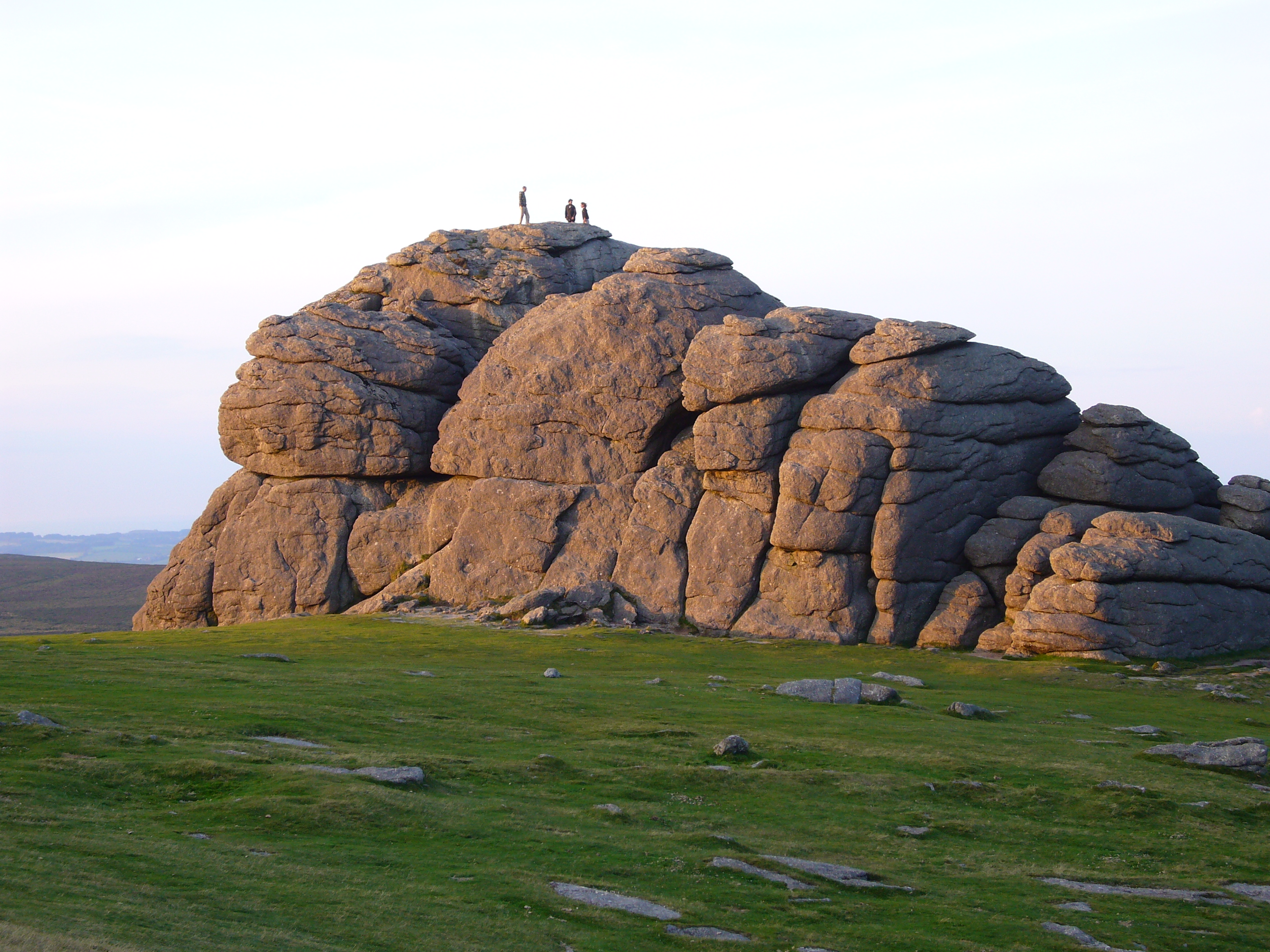
Spheroidal or woolsack weathering in granite on Haytor, Dartmoor, England

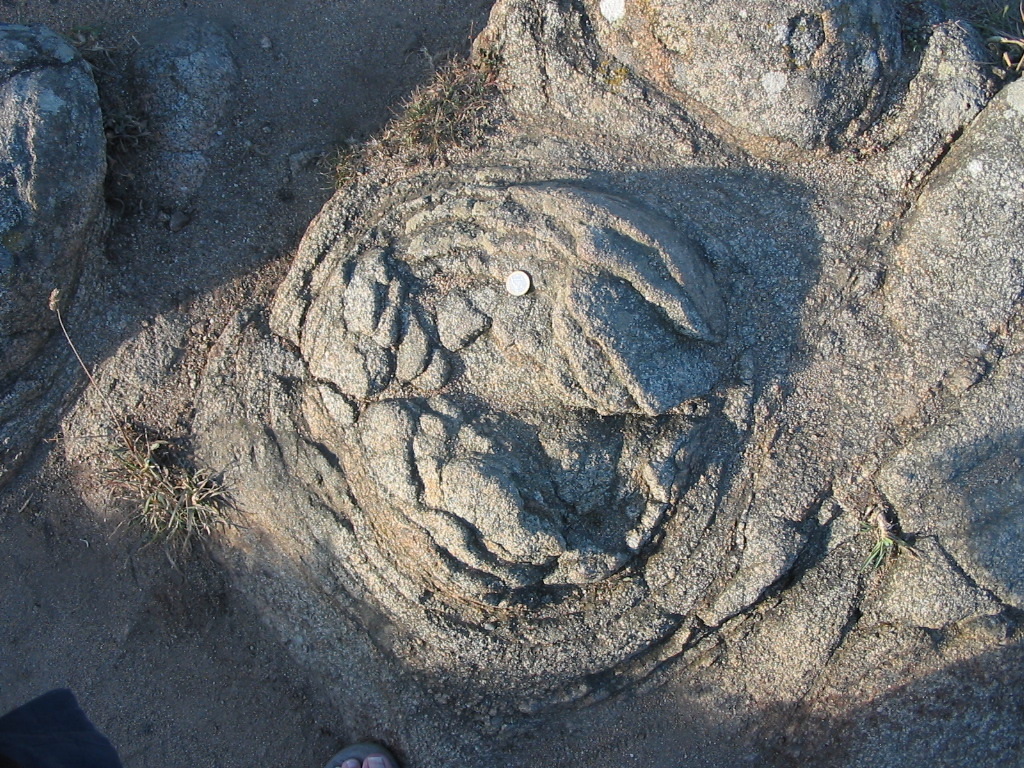
Spheroidal weathering in granite, Estaca de Bares, A Coruña, Galicia, Spain

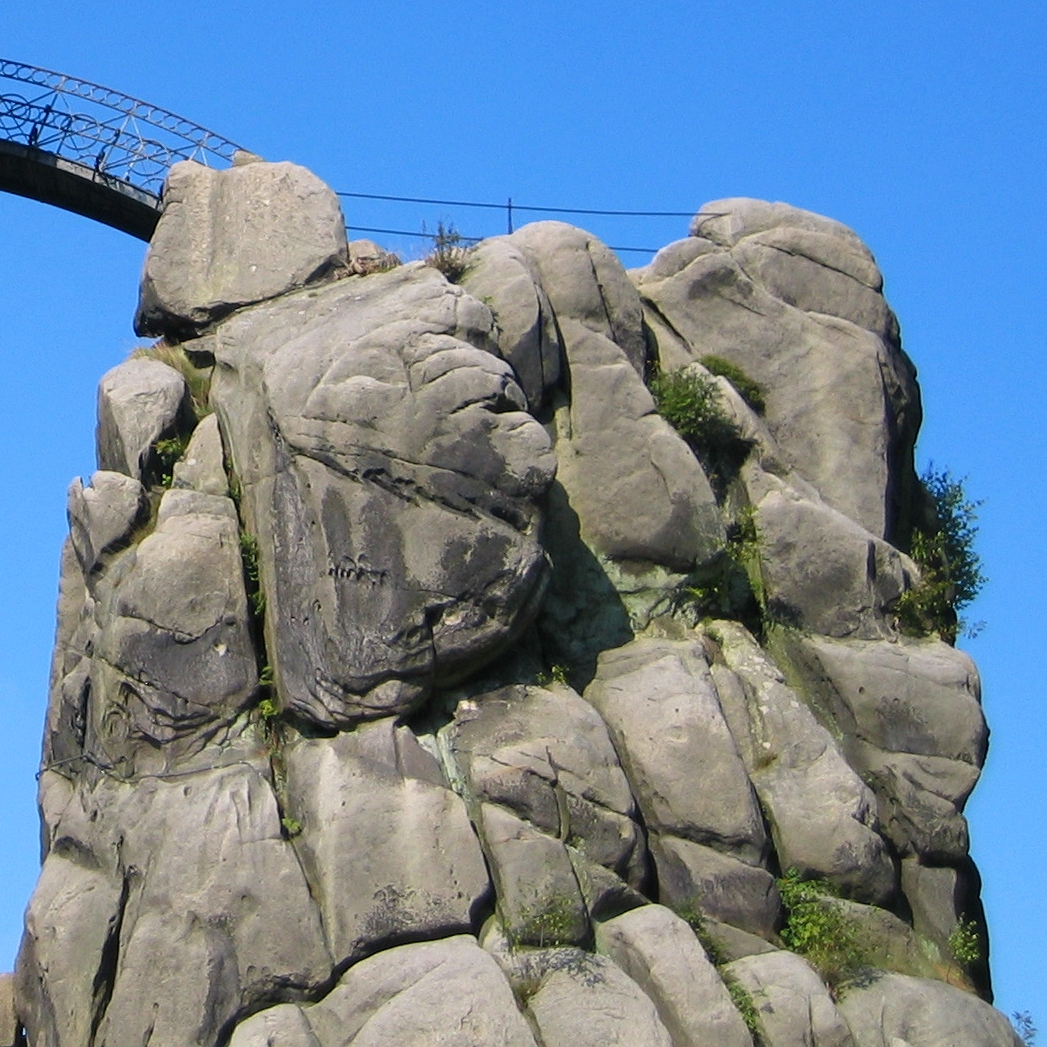
Woolsack weathering in sandstone at the Externsteine rocks, Teutoburg Forest, Germany

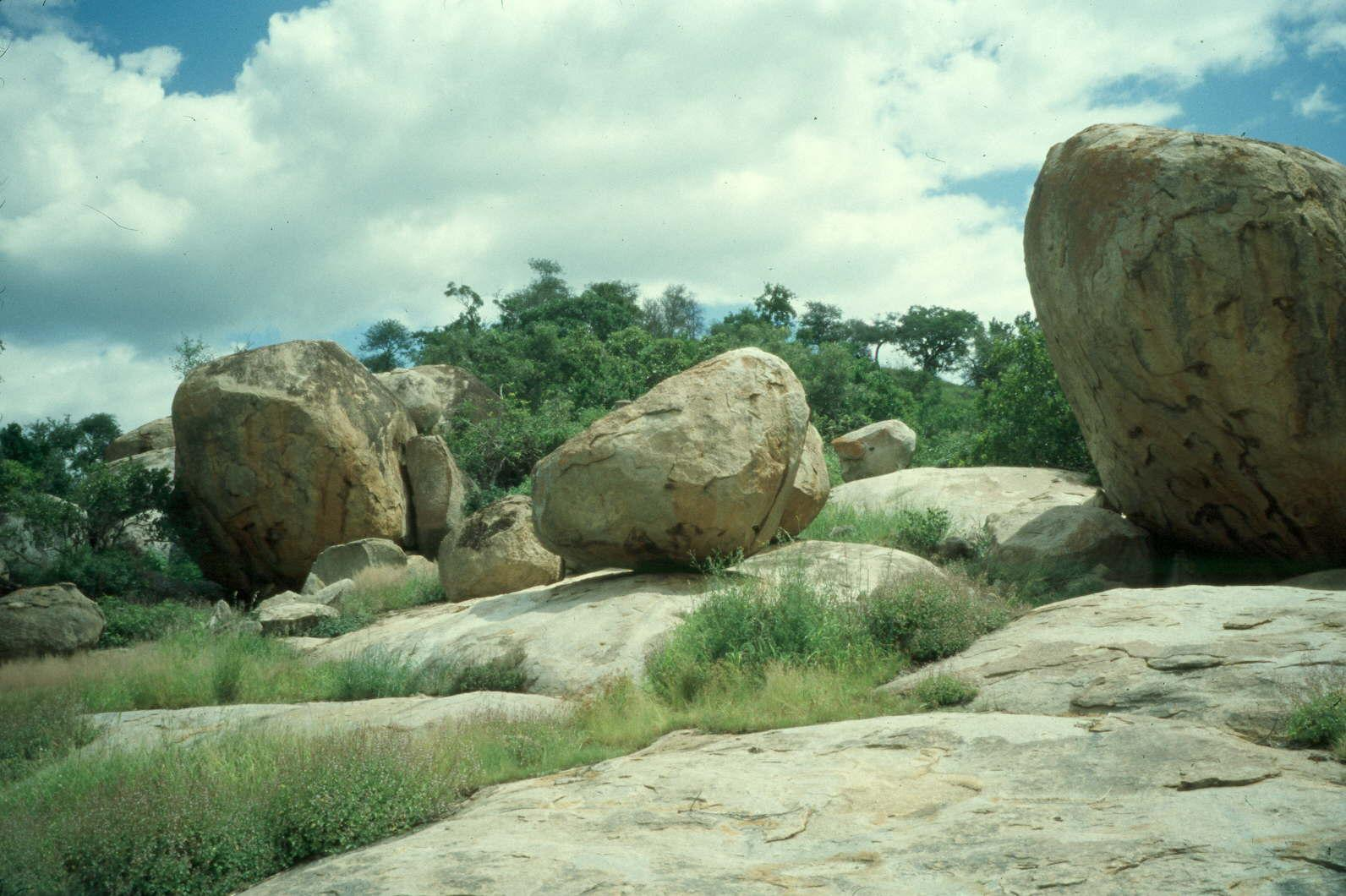
Corestones near Musina, South Africa that were created by spherodial weathering and exposed by the removal of surrounding saprolite by erosion.

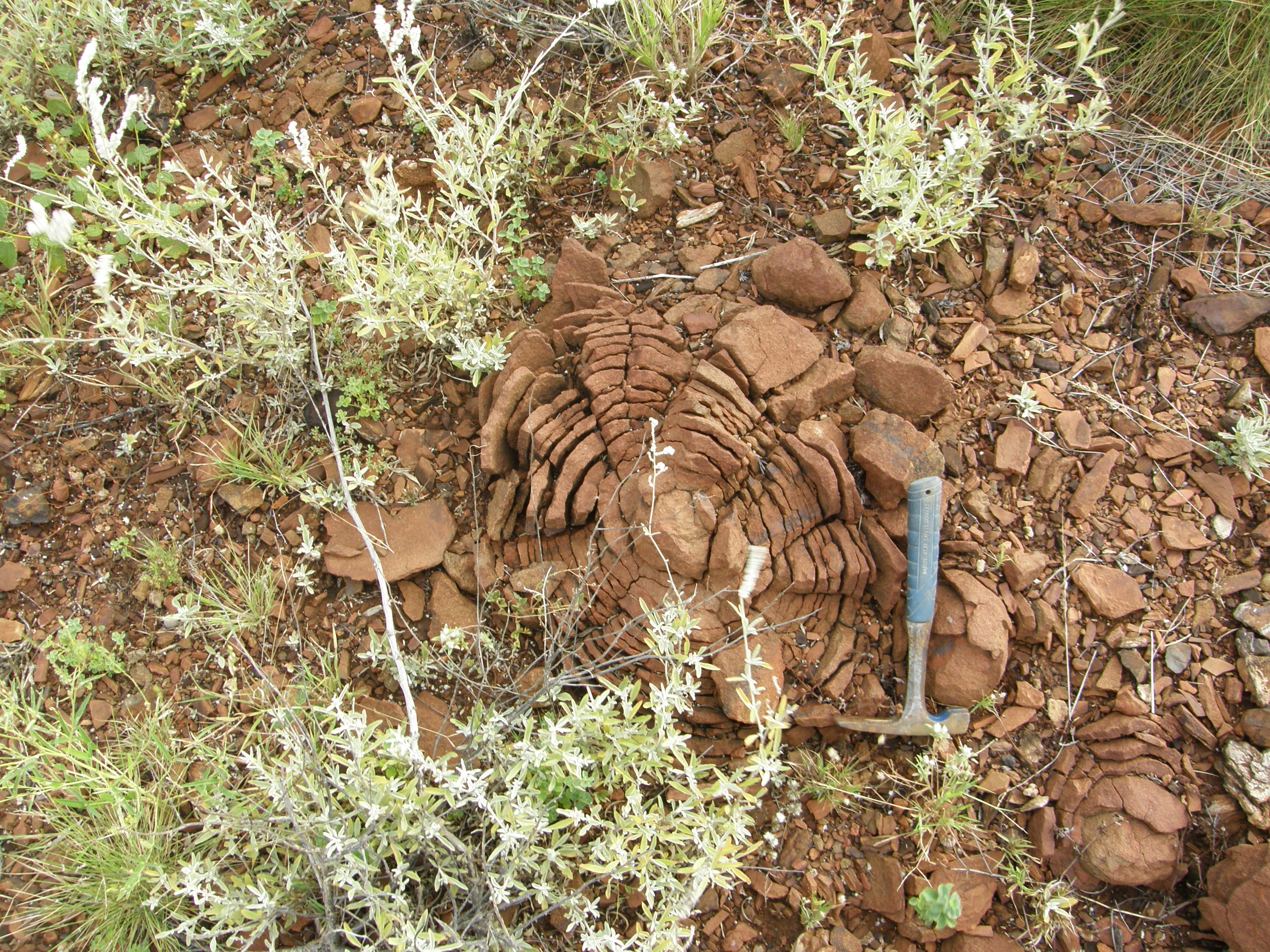
Spheroidal weathering of a dolerite dyke, Pilbara, Western Australia

Spheroidal weathering is a form of chemical weathering that affects jointed bedrock and results in the formation of concentric or spherical layers of highly decayed rock within weathered bedrock that is known as saprolite. When saprolite is exposed by physical erosion, these concentric layers peel (spall) off as concentric shells much like the layers of a peeled onion. Within saprolite, spheroidal weathering often creates rounded boulders, known as corestones or woolsack, of relatively unweathered rock. Spheroidal weathering is also called onion skin weathering, concentric weathering, spherical weathering, or woolsack weathering.

== Weathering process ==
Spheroidally weathered granite corestones of the 1.4-billion-year-old Graniteville Granite at Elephant Rocks State Park, Missouri. Groundwater weathering along fracture joints rounded the corners and edges of the granite blocks before erosion exposed the boulders at the surface.

Spheroidal weathering is the result of chemical weathering of systematically jointed, massive rocks, including granite, dolerite, basalt and sedimentary rocks such as silicified sandstone. It occurs as the result of the chemical alteration of such rocks along intersecting joints. The chemical alteration of the rock results in the formation of abundant secondary minerals such as kaolinite, sericite, serpentine, montmorillonite, and chlorite and a corresponding increase in the volume of the altered rock. When the joints within bedrock form a 3-dimensional network, they subdivide it into separate blocks, often in the form of rough cubes or rectangular prisms that are bounded by these joints. Because water can penetrate the bedrock along these joints, the near-surface bedrock will be altered by weathering progressively inward along the faces of these blocks. The alteration by weathering of the bedrock will be greatest along the corners of each block, followed by the edges, and finally the faces of the cube. The differences in weathering rates between the corners, edges, and faces of a bedrock block will result in the formation of spheroidal layers of altered rock that surround an unaltered rounded boulder-size core of relatively unaltered rock known as a corestone or woolsack. Spheroidal weathering has often been incorrectly attributed solely to various types of physical weathering.

Frequently, erosion has removed the layers of altered rock and other saprolite surrounding corestones that were produced by spheroidal weathering. This leaves many corestones as freestanding boulders on the ground's surface. Often the spheroidal weathering, which created these corestones and the enclosing saprolite occurred in the prehistoric past during periods of humid, even tropical climates. Frequently, the removal of the saprolite by erosion and exposure of corestones as freestanding residual boulders, tors, or other landforms occurs many thousands of years later and during vastly different climatic conditions.

Depending on local environmental conditions, spheroidal weathering of bedrock blocks defined by tectonically induced joints and fractures may result in the formation of prominent and well-defined Liesegang rings within these blocks. These blocks typically consist of bedrock blocks (Liesegang blocks), which are bounded on their periphery by joints and fractures, and, in sedimentary rocks, bedding planes above and below. Each Liesegang block consists of a relatively unaltered core surrounded by concentric, alternating shells of iron-poor (intermediate shells) and iron-rich ('iron' shells) composition which make up the Liesegang rings. These iron-poor and iron-rich shells follow the configuration of the outer shape of the block and are sub-parallel to its sides. The iron-rich and iron-poor shells vary in degree of cementation and, as a result, can produce box work weathering structures during subsequent erosion. The degree of development of Liesegang rings as the result of weathering depends upon the spacing of the joint systems, groundwater flow, local topography, bedrock composition, and bed thickness.

== See also ==
- Exfoliation (geology), a related form of weathering that also creates domes.
- Exfoliating granite
- Weathering rind
