= Black Butte (Oregon) =

Extinct stratovolcano in US

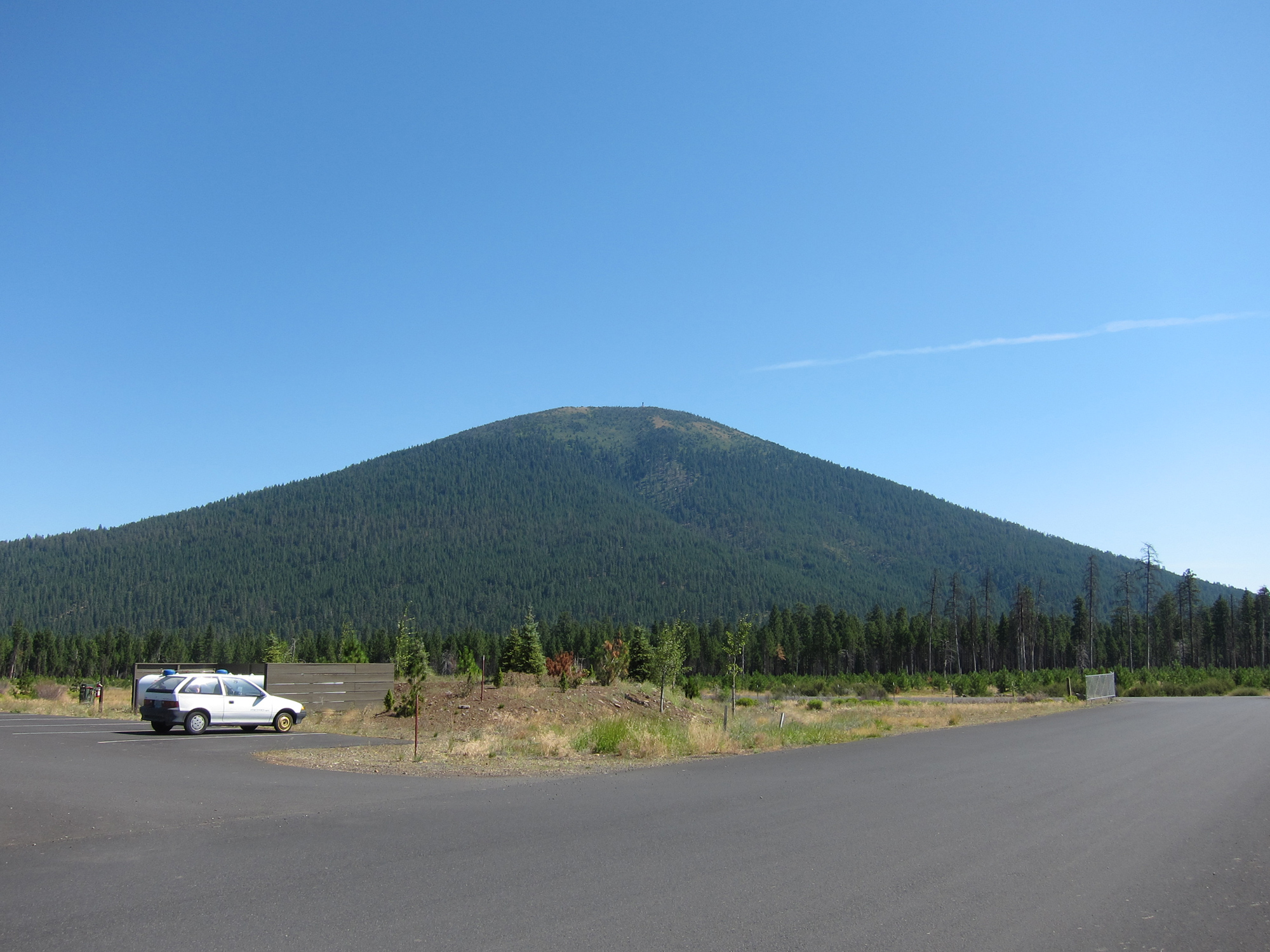

Highest point
- Elevation: 6,436 ft (1,962 m) NAVD 88
- Prominence: 3,076 ft (938 m)
- Coordinates: 44°23′59″N 121°38′08″W

Geography
- Location within Oregon Location within the United States
- Location: Jefferson County, Oregon, U.S.
- Parent range: Cascade Range
- Topo map: USGS Black Butte

Geology
- Rock age: Pleistocene
- Mountain type: Stratovolcano
- Volcanic arc: Cascade Volcanic Arc
- Last eruption: About 1,430,000 years ago

Climbing
- Easiest route: Hike

Black Butte is an extinct stratovolcano in the U.S. state of Oregon. Located in Jefferson County, it is part of Deschutes National Forest. Black Butte forms part of the Cascade volcanic arc. The butte lies just south of the Metolius Springs, which merge to form the headwaters of the Metolius River. The Metolius River's basin sustains a wide array of plant life, large and small mammals, and more than 80 bird species.

Black Butte last erupted during the Pleistocene; geologists have estimated its age at 0.4, 0.5, and 1.43 ± 0.33 million years ago. The duration of the eruptions that built the volcano remains unclear, though the activity likely coincided with large-scale block faulting in the vicinity of the Metolius Springs. Black Butte has a prominent volcanic cone and is made up of mafic (rich in magnesium and iron) basaltic andesite lava. Despite having a well-preserved, symmetrical shape and an unexposed pyroclastic core, the butte has undergone moderate erosion, with shallow ravines, deep gullies on its sides, and rocks with weathering rinds. A number of cinder cones and a volcanic field also lie nearby the butte.

There was a fire lookout ground house on the butte, which was burned down by the United States Forest Service in 2016. A white cupola structure sits on the top of the butte as well as a more modern fire lookout tower. The resort community Black Butte Ranch lies nearby and offers recreational activities like horseback riding, biking, hiking, canoeing, kayaking, and paddleboarding; during the winter, activities include Nordic skiing and snowshoeing.

== Geography ==
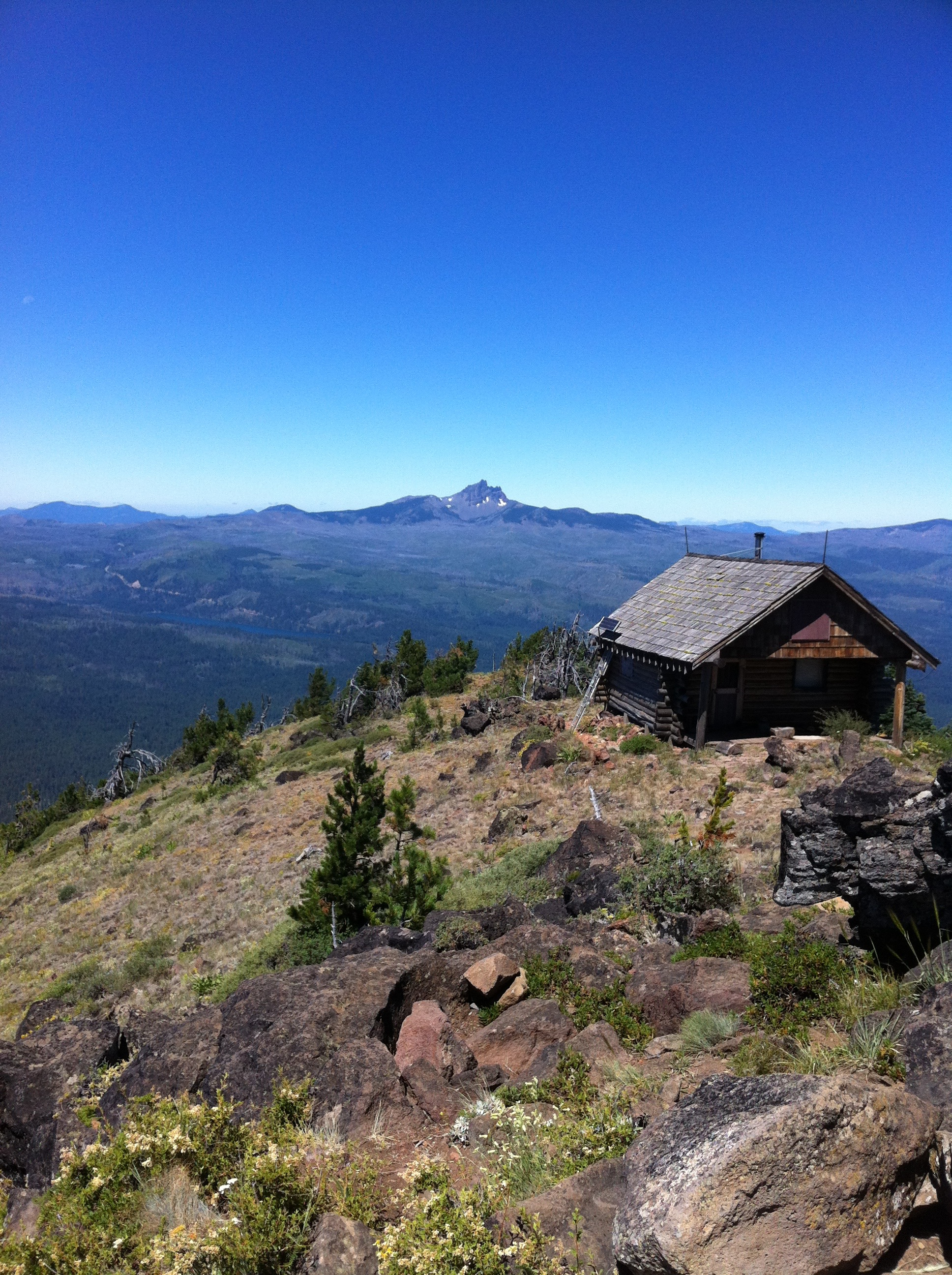
The summit of the butte with Three Fingered Jack in the distance. The fire lookout ground house in the foreground was burned down by the United States Forest Service in 2016.

Black Butte lies about 21 miles (34 km) to the southeast of Mount Jefferson and about 8.6 miles (13.8 km) northwest of the junction of U.S. Route 126 and U.S. Route 20, at the eastern edge of the city of Sisters. The butte is part of Jefferson County in the U.S. state of Oregon. Other volcanoes such as Three Fingered Jack and Mount Washington lie about 10 miles (16 km) to the west.

According to the U.S. National Geodetic Survey and scientists from the United States Geological Survey, Black Butte has an elevation of 6,436 feet (1,962 m); the Geographic Names Information System database lists its elevation as 6,430 feet (1,960 m), while Oregon Geographic Names lists its elevation at 6,415 feet (1,955 m).^{[a]} The butte has proximal and draping reliefs of 2,490 feet (760 m) and 3,150 feet (960 m), which are the "difference between summit elevation and that of highest exposure of older rocks overlain by the edifice" and the "difference between summit elevation and that of lowest distal lavas of the edifice (not including distal pyroclastic or debris flows)," respectively. According to E. M. Taylor, Black Butte has a diameter of 4 miles (6.4 km).

The U.S. National Geodetic Survey report describes Black Butte as a "very prominent" mountain; it is an imposing feature and landmark in the Deschutes Valley because of its dark color and symmetry. Part of the Cascade volcanic arc in the northwestern United States, it lies within a rain shadow about 6.2 miles (10 km) to the east of the major mountain range. In the High Cascades, the equilibrium line altitudes for valley glaciers follow a gradient of about 74 feet per mile (14 m/km), which is significantly steeper than the gradient for the Western Cascades. Moving east, precipitation decreases across the Cascade arc; the gradient is even steeper east of the major crest at Black Butte, where the gradient is more than 200 feet per mile (38 m/km). W. E. Scott argues that the volcano displays no evidence of glaciation.

Black Butte lies just south of the Metolius Springs, which lie in the southwestern corner of Jefferson County. Accessible by roads branching off U.S. Route 20, the springs are located about 30 miles (48 km) northwest of the cities of Bend and Redmond. Black Butte rises above the surrounding Metolius Valley, which has a width of about 3 miles (4.8 km) and an elevation above sea level of 3,000 feet (910 m). At the volcano's northern base lie two openings spaced about 200 yards (180 m) apart, which give rise to the Metolius Springs. Bubbling out at a temperature of 48 °F (9 °C), the springs merge to form the headwaters of the Metolius River, generating a total flow of 45,000 to 50,000 US gallons per minute (170,000 to 190,000 L/min) over the course of each year. The river runs for 35 miles (56 km) to the north and east before reaching the Deschutes River, picking up 600,000 US gallons (2,300,000 L) along the way from other springs and tributaries along the eastern Cascade Range. As glaciers advanced and retreated and snow fields formed over time, they caused erosion, which was carried by streams associated with the Metolius River to spread across the river valley's floor.

The last of these glaciers existed until about 10,000 years ago, with their end points marked hummocks of debris. The glaciers formed glacial troughs, deposited moraines, and moved sand and gravel along with volcanic ash and cinders to cover the Metolius Valley floor. Black Butte lies about 5 miles (8.0 km) east–southeast of Suttle Lake, which occupies one of the local glacial troughs.

Eruptions from Black Butte buried the ancestral Metolius River and left boulders of lava in the area, and Black Butte's formation dammed drainages for the Metolius, dividing the Metolius Valley into the northern segment where the river now runs and a southern portion that includes Black Butte Swamp, Glaze Meadow, and Indian Ford Creek. Black Butte Swamp and Glaze Meadow were likely formerly shallow lakes, though they now serve as sumps for streams and drainages from the Cascades, which are located to the southwest. Black Butte Swamp is a particularly important sump for extensive drainage from the southwest, its basin water lapping against Black Butte's southern base. Because it is elevated about 300 feet (91 m) above the Metolius Springs, the swamp acts as a hydraulic head for the spring water keeping the flow of the springs constant, and ensuring that there is a net influx of water into the swamp. Any excess water exits through Indian Ford Creek to flow east then south past the city of Sisters. In modern times, the Metolius Valley consists of glacial outwash, lava strata, and stream sediment, which together act as a sponge for snow and rain water percolating into the river basin.

== Ecology ==
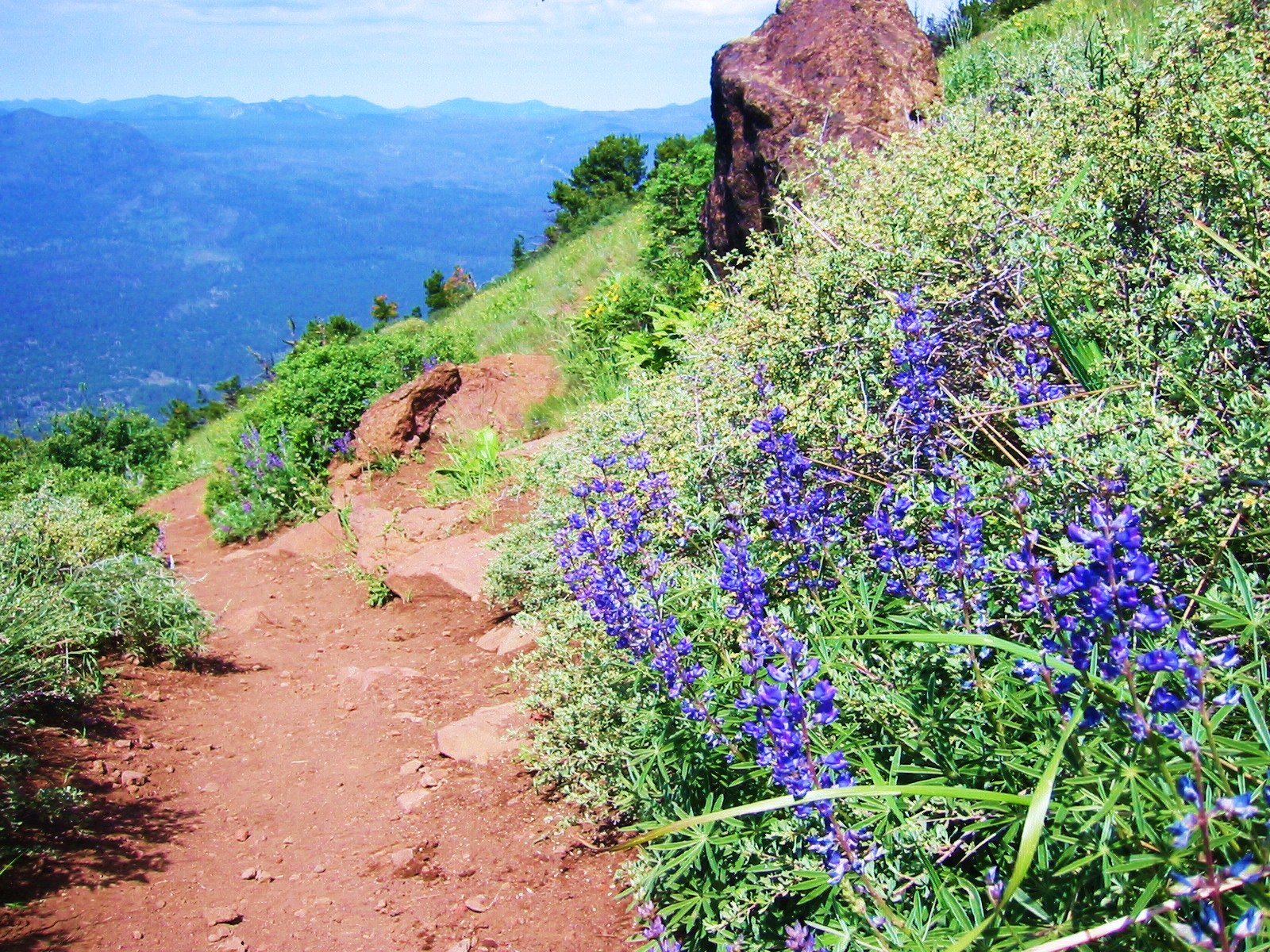
Wildflowers on Black Butte

Black Butte lies east of the major crest of the Cascades, which is more arid compared to the Western Cascades. Two forest populations at Black Butte were analyzed in a 1975 study conducted by D. B. Zobel of Oregon State University. These forest areas included ponderosa pine and tree species intermediate to grand and white firs. The study found that trees at Black Butte did not experience significant moisture stress and that photosynthesis rates during dry summer seasons were more reduced at tree sites in the Western Cascades compared to at Black Butte. Black Butte was found to have a shorter growing season and less favorable winter temperatures for photosynthesis at its forest sites than study areas in the Western Cascade Province. Along the trail that runs up Black Butte, the forest is diverse, with yellow-bellied ponderosa pines, mixed conifers, and subalpine vegetation.

Black Butte is part of the Deschutes National Forest, which covers close to 1,600,000 acres (6,500 km^{2}) in central Oregon. It is also part of the Metolius Black Butte Scenic area within the Metolius Conservation Area, which encompasses about 10,600 acres (43 km^{2}) and includes suitable habitat for northern goshawks. The Metolius River passes through old-growth forests of ponderosa pine, as well as forests of Douglas fir and western larch. Every May native plants and wildflowers appear, including early blue violets, larkspur, serviceberry, Sitka valerian, and western buttercups. During the summer season, river trails more prominently display plant species like arrowleaf balsamroot, American brooklime, bigleaf lupine, Douglas's spirea, Indian paintbrush, and monkeyflower plants. On islands in the river, wildflowers occasionally grow after their seeds bloom after falling into the water and accumulating over time. The area is noted for a rare species of Penstemon known as Penstemon peckii, a wildflower that appears in 7 different colors, which is endemic to the Sisters area. Other plants within the Metolius Preserve include incense cedar trees, nutka rose, ocean spray, snowberry, and vine maple trees.

More than 80 species of bird inhabit the Metolius Preserve area such as the white-headed woodpecker. The area supports large mammals like American black bears, badgers, bobcats, beavers, deer, cougars, elk, and otters, as well as smaller mammals like northern flying squirrels, shrews, and voles.

== Geology ==
In the Oregon segment of the Cascade Volcanoes that runs for 210 miles (340 km) south of Mount Hood, there are at least 1,054 Quaternary volcanoes, which form a volcanic belt 16 to 31 miles (25 to 50 km) in width. This volcanic belt extends up to 19 miles (30 km) to the north of the border with California, where Quaternary volcanic activity is interrupted by a 40-mile (64 km) gap up to the Quaternary volcanoes near Mount Shasta. The Quaternary volcanoes within the Oregon Cascades are extremely dense, concentrated within an area of about 3,700 square miles (9,500 km^{2}). Rocks within the Metolius Springs area form part of the High Cascades province and include both volcanic and glaciofluvial deposits.

Black Butte marks the edge of the Sisters fault zone, which includes about 50 known faults that extend southeast through the cities of Sisters and Bend. In total, the Sisters fault zone runs for 37 miles (60 km) in length, with its width varying between 3.1 to 9.3 miles (5 to 15 km). Black Butte itself sits on a small fault that straddles the graben, and its lava deposits have been displaced slightly by a fault on the northwestern side of the volcano. To the north lies the Green Ridge fault scarp, which trends to north and rises about 2,000 feet (610 m) above the Metolius Valley. The fault's steep escarpment contains exposed, alternating layers of basaltic andesite, breccia, and agglomerate from shield volcanoes, which mark the oldest rocks in the area. They are of Pliocene age, overlying diatomite, pumice, and tuffaceous sandstone layers.

Most of the volcanoes in the Oregon Cascades are either scoria cones, small shield volcanoes, or lava fields, though the segment contains a number of basaltic andesite stratovolcanoes such as Mount McLoughlin. Black Butte is one such stratovolcano (also known as a composite volcano), with a mafic (rich in magnesium and iron) composition. It is an extinct volcano.

Also composed of basaltic andesite, the cone rises 3,076 feet (938 m) over the surrounding plateau. Black Butte is a striking feature just north of US Highway 20, which descends from the east flank of the Cascades. It is nearly symmetrical with a youthful profile, though it is actually older than any other visible High Cascades volcano. Black Butte is well-preserved due to a lack of glaciation east of the major Cascade arc. Black Butte has undergone mild erosion, with shallow ravines on its slopes, deep gullies on its sides, and rocks with weathering rinds. Black Butte forms a steep-sided volcanic cone, with an unexposed pyroclastic core and no summit crater. It is one of the larger mafic volcanic cones in the Oregon Cascades, with a volume of 2.4 cubic miles (10 km^{3}). Black Butte's composition is characteristic for the High Cascades, consisting of light to dark gray basaltic andesite rock with a fine to medium grain. The flanks of the volcano display outcrops of the lava, which are blocky and mixed with zones of breccia, suggesting the flows were slow-moving and were erupted from a central vent.

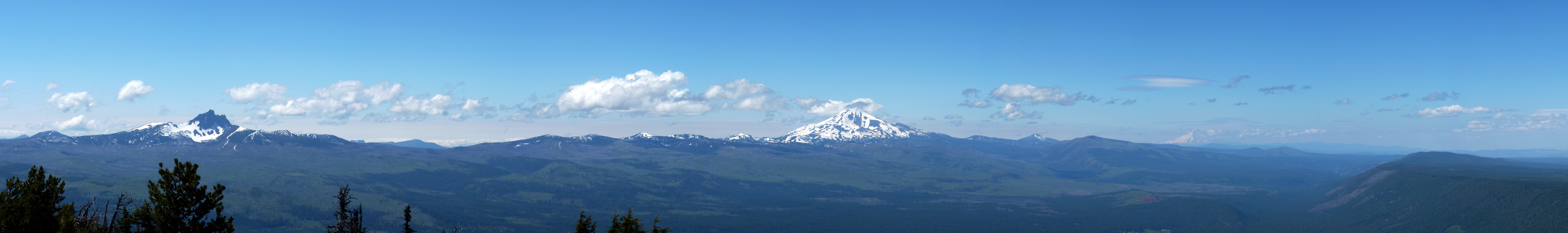
View to the northwest from the peak of Black Butte; the Cascade Range mountains Three Fingered Jack can be seen to the left and Mount Jefferson to the right.

=== Nearby features ===
The Sixmile Butte lava field, of Pleistocene age, consists of ten cinder cones between Black Butte and Black Crater. These cones erupted basaltic andesite, which was deposited prior to the glacial advance at Suttle Lake. The field encompasses about 25 square miles (65 km^{2}). Lava deposits from nearby Cache Mountain have a normal magnetic polarity, corresponding to a potassium–argon dating age of 0.9 ± 0.05 million years, suggesting they were produced during the Jaramillo normal polarity of the Matuyama period between 0.98 and 1.04 million years ago. There is a chain of Pleistocene cinder cones east of the butte that trends from northwest to southeast, with other Pleistocene cinder cones located to the south. There is also a mafic, well-preserved cinder cone above the Green Ridge fault zone, which produced a Pleistocene lava flow.

== Eruptive history ==
A study by Sherrod and his associates used potassium–argon dating to trace samples from Black Butte to 1.43 ± 0.33 million years ago, during the Matuyama Polarity Zone of reversed magnetic polarity. These dates superseded an earlier determination of 400,000 years, which was recognized as incorrect based on polarity magnetization of the lava; according to Peterson and Groh, E. M. Taylor also communicated an age of about 500,000 years for Black Butte from K–Ar dating of its rock.

Large-scale block faulting in the vicinity of the Metolius Springs could have coincided with the beginning of volcanic activity in the High Cascades, which gradually progressed from building shield-shaped edifices to more violent eruptions. Volcanism resumed after the Green Ridge fault scarp reached its maximum height and fault movement ceased, occurring along a fault within the graben in the Metolius Springs vicinity. These eruptions built up Black Butte, though their duration is not clear. The magmas at Black Butte likely had to ascend through the Green Ridge fault.

Sherrod and his associates described an ancient basaltic andesite deposit from the Pleistocene, which displays reverse polarity and is older than 0.78 million years. This deposit includes lava flows from Black Butte, which are slightly to moderately porphyritic in texture and exhibit 5–10 percent plagioclase phenocrysts, about 0.039 to 0.079 inches (1 to 2 mm) in length. They also have 3–5 percent olivine phenocrysts, which are about 0.039 inches (1 mm) across. Sherrod et al. also described two previously identified, reverse-polarized basaltic andesite lava deposits at Black Butte, with ages of 0.46 ± 0.30 and 0.48 ± 0.2 million years, respectively. The volcano's last known eruption was during the Pleistocene. However, some eruptive activity has continued in the High Cascades; there is one lava flow in the McKenzie Pass area to the west of Black Butte, which is only 1,500 years old.

== Human history ==
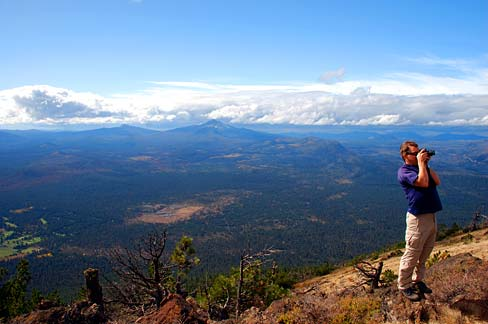
A hiker on Black Butte

Black Butte was a familiar landmark to the Native Americans. Ella E. Clark records a traditional story of the butte told to her by two Native Americans living on the Warm Springs Reservation, which had been told to them by their grandfathers. According to this tale, the mountains of Central Oregon were once people: Black Butte was the wife of nearby Green Ridge. Mount Hood and Mount Adams quarreled over a woman, and would regularly cross the Bridge of the Gods to fight. Coyote called the other mountains to come and help arbitrate the dispute. The mountains marched north, including Black Butte and Green Ridge. The trip tired Black Butte, and she stopped to rest at the head of the Metolius River; Green Mountain was annoyed that she had stopped, and laid down, pouting. Coyote decided he could wait no longer, and broke the Bridge of the Gods; this caused the mountains to remain where they had stopped.

It is not known who gave Black Butte its modern name, though historical records show settlers calling the volcano by that name as early as 1855. Lieutenant H. L. Abbot, one of the engineers involved with the Pacific Railroad Surveys, referred to the volcano as Pivot Mountain in a diary entry published in the Oregon Historical Quarterly, though he also used the name Black Butte in the Pacific Railroad Surveys Reports. During his work for the surveys, Abbot scouted railroad routes in the area surrounding Black Butte, ultimately concluding that a railroad could not be built over the Cascade Range near Mount Jefferson.

The butte had a fire lookout ground house, which was built in 1979 out of wood, though the butte has been used for fire detection since 1910. Fire lookout staff used the station to cook and sleep before it was condemned in 2014 and burned down in 2016 by the United States Forest Service, who released a statement that it "was ineligible for preservation as a historical structure both in time and because of improvements made." Lookouts still work at Black Butte during the fire season but use a yurt (a type of portable tent) instead. There has been a white cupola structure on the top of the butte since 1923 and a more modern fire lookout tower, 62-foot (19 m) tall, which was built in 1995; neither are accessible to visitors.

=== Recreation ===
The land around Black Butte and the Metolius Springs is managed by the United States Forest Service, which has constructed a parking lot, trail, and viewpoint for the area. There are a number of famous fishing resorts and a popular recreation area nearby. Black Butte Ranch, which lies in Deschutes County within Deschutes National Forest, is a resort community that encompasses 1,800 acres (7.3 km^{2}) and offers recreational activities including horseback riding, biking, hiking, canoeing, kayaking, and paddleboarding; during the winter, the resort activities include Nordic skiing and snowshoeing.

The Black Butte hiking trail runs for about 2 miles (3.2 km) from a trailhead up the butte. Trees thin in the second mile of the hike. The trailhead is particularly busy during the summer season with vehicles and hikers, though the hiking trail itself is for hikers only. The hike is popular and not demanding, climbing about 1,600 feet (490 m) to the peak, where Three Sisters, Mount Washington, and Mount Jefferson can be seen.

== Notes ==
- [a] Taylor (1981) incorrectly lists Black Butte's elevation at 3,200 feet (980 m).

== Sources ==
- Deschutes National Forest Land and Resource Management Plan (PDF) (Report). United States Forest Service. 1990. Archived from the original (PDF) on April 26, 2019..
- Hildreth, W. (2007). Quaternary magmatism in the Cascades: geologic perspectives. United States Geological Survey. ISBN 978-1-4113-1945-5. ISSN 1044-9612. Professional Paper 1744. Archived from the original on March 25, 2019.
- McArthur, L. A.; McArthur, L. L. (1984) [1928]. Oregon Geographic Names (6th ed.). Portland, Oregon: Oregon Historical Society Press. ISBN 978-0-87595-237-6.
- Peterson, N. V.; Groh, R. A. (March 1972). "Geology and Origin of the Metolius Springs, Jefferson County, Oregon" (PDF). The Ore Bin. 34 (3). Oregon Department of Geology and Mineral Industries. Archived from the original on January 31, 2021.
- Scott, W. E. (January 1, 1977). "Quaternary glaciation and volcanism, Metolius River area, Oregon". Geological Society of America Bulletin. 88 (1). Geological Society of America: 113–124. Bibcode:1977GSAB...88..113S. doi:10.1130/0016-7606(1977)88<113:QGAVMR>2.0.CO;2. ISSN 1943-2674.
- Sawyer, R. W. (March 1932). "Abbot Railroad Surveys, 1855". Oregon Historical Quarterly. 33 (1): 1–24. JSTOR 20610693.
- Sherrod, D. R.; Taylor, E. M.; Ferns, M. L.; Scott, W. E.; Conrey, R. M.; Smith, G. A. (2004). "Geologic Map of the Bend 30-×60-Minute Quadrangle, Central Oregon" (PDF). Geologic Investigations Series I–2683. Archived (PDF) from the original on March 25, 2019.
- Taylor, E. M. (1981). Johnson, D. A.; Donnelly-Nolan, J. (eds.). Road log for central High Cascade geology, Bend, Sisters, McKenzie Pass, and Santiam Pass, Oregon (PDF) (Report). Guides to some Volcanic Terranes in Washington, Idaho, Oregon, and Northern California. United States Geological Survey. pp. 59–83. Bibcode:1981usgs.rept....2J. Geological Survey Circular 838. Archived (PDF) from the original on June 21, 2020.
- Zobel, D. B. (1975). "Local Variation in Intergrading Abies Grandis-Abies Concolor Populations in the Central Oregon Cascades. III. Timing of Growth and Stomatal Characteristics in Relation to Environment". Botanical Gazette. 136 (1): 63–71. doi:10.1086/336783. JSTOR 2473793. S2CID 85387735.
