= Metolius Springs =

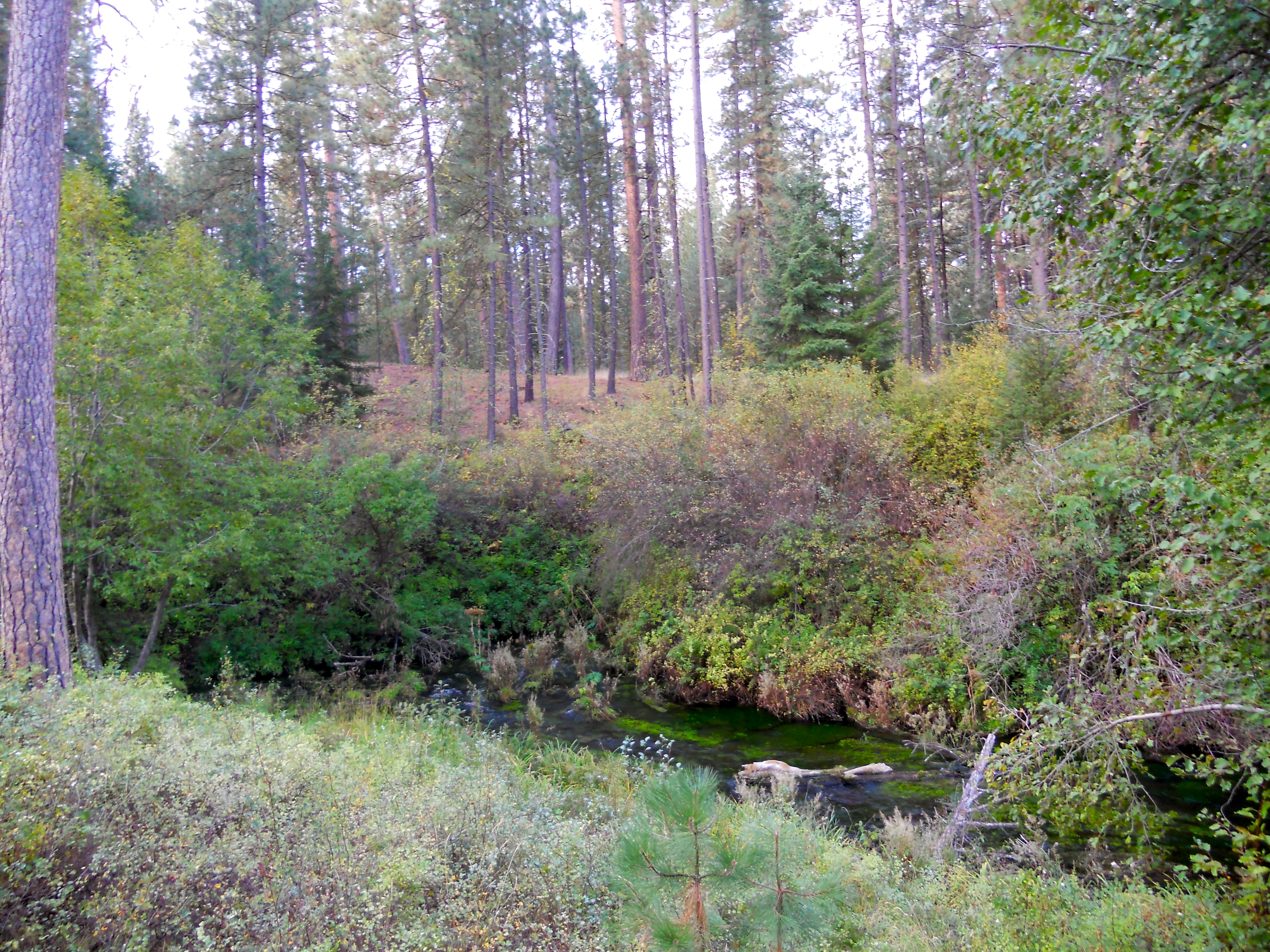
- The Metolius River emerging from its springs
- Interactive map of Metolius Springs
- Type: Natural cold springs
- Location: Jefferson County, Oregon, USA
- Coordinates: 44.43444°N 121.63900°W
- Operator: U.S. Forest Service

Metolius Springs are located just north of Black Butte near the small unincorporated town of Camp Sherman in central Oregon, United States. The springs are the source of the Metolius River, which flows 29 miles (47 km) through the Deschutes National Forest emptying into Lake Billy Chinook. The flow from Metolius Springs is sufficient to create a full-flowing river, making the Metolius River one of the largest spring-fed rivers in the United States. The name of the springs comes from the Warm Springs or Sahaptin word mitula, meaning white salmon and referring to a light colored Chinook salmon and not a whitefish.

== Sources ==
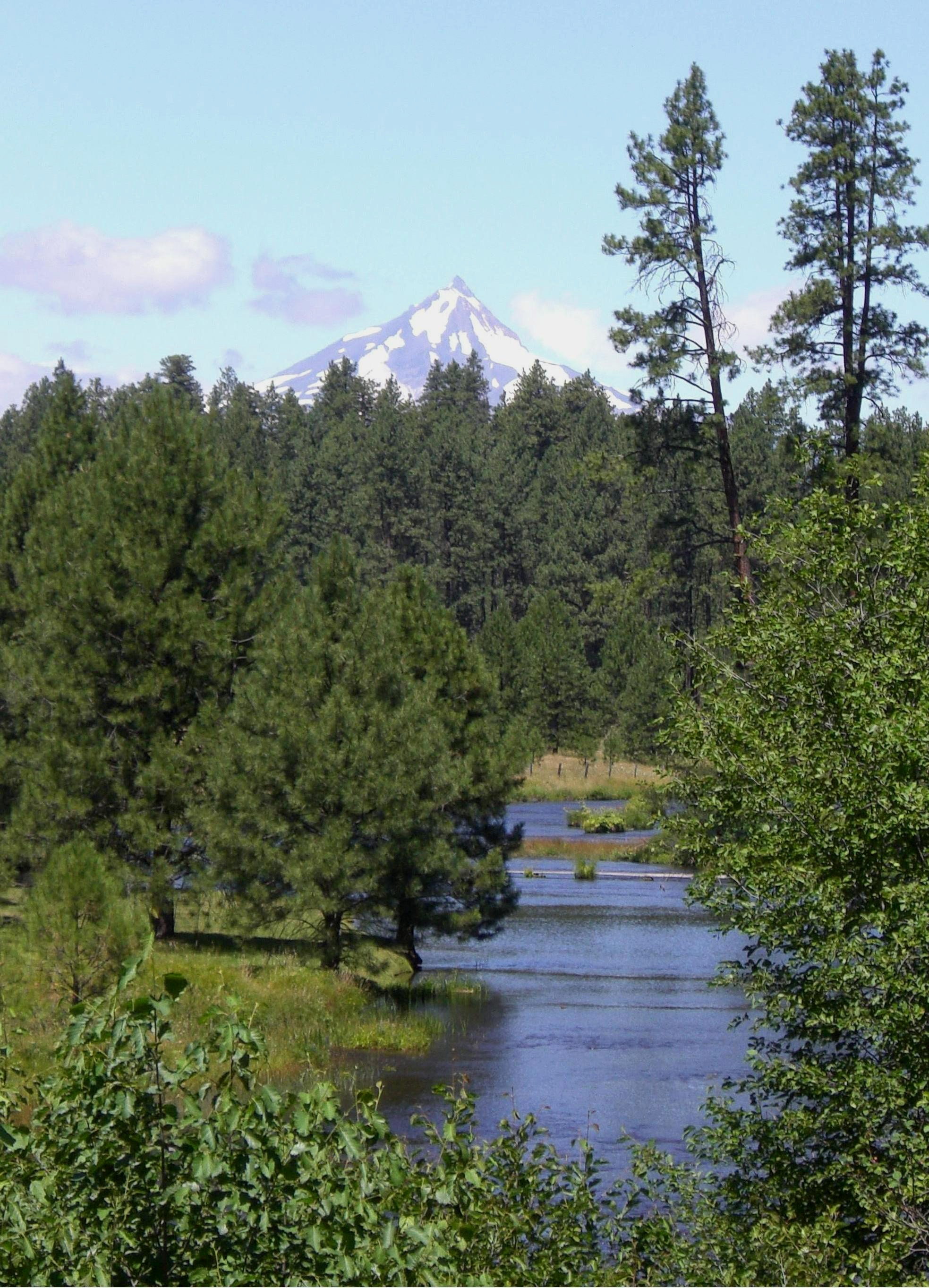
The Metolius just downstream from its source, with Mt. Jefferson in the background.

The source of the springs is unknown, but there is evidence that it comes from a large drainage basin near Black Butte Ranch, several miles south of Black Butte. The elevation of the Black Butte Ranch drainage basin is 300 feet (91 m) above that of the springs which would allow a natural flow of water under Black Butte to the Metolius headwaters.

The springs were probably created about one and a half million years ago when Black Butte erupted blocking a north-flowing river. With the newly formed butte blocking the natural channel, water backed up south of the mountain creating a swampy meadow area. Over time, the water seeps through porous rocks under the butte and now emerges on the north side of Black Butte at Metolius Springs.

There are two groups of springs about 200 feet (61 m) apart that create the headwaters of the Metolius River. Springwater gushes from its underground source at a rate of 50,000 US gallons per minute (190,000 L/min). This makes the Metolius one of the largest spring-fed rivers in the country. The water temperature at the springs is 48 °F (9 °C).

== Viewing area ==
The Metolius Springs and 160 acres (0.65 km^{2}) around it were originally owned by Sam Johnson, a wealthy lumber mill owner. Johnson preserved the springs in their natural state, and allowed public access to a scenic headwaters viewing area located on his land. In 1965, Johnson gave the Metolius Springs viewing area to the United States Forest Service.

Today, the Deschutes National Forest maintains a day-use viewing area overlooking Metolius Springs. The site is normally open from April until November. It includes a paved walkway from the parking area to the Metolius Springs viewing point with interpretative signs along the way. There are also three picnic tables and a vault-type toilet facility. However, there is no potable water and camping is not allowed at the site.
