= Metolius Climbing =

American rock climbing gear manufacturer

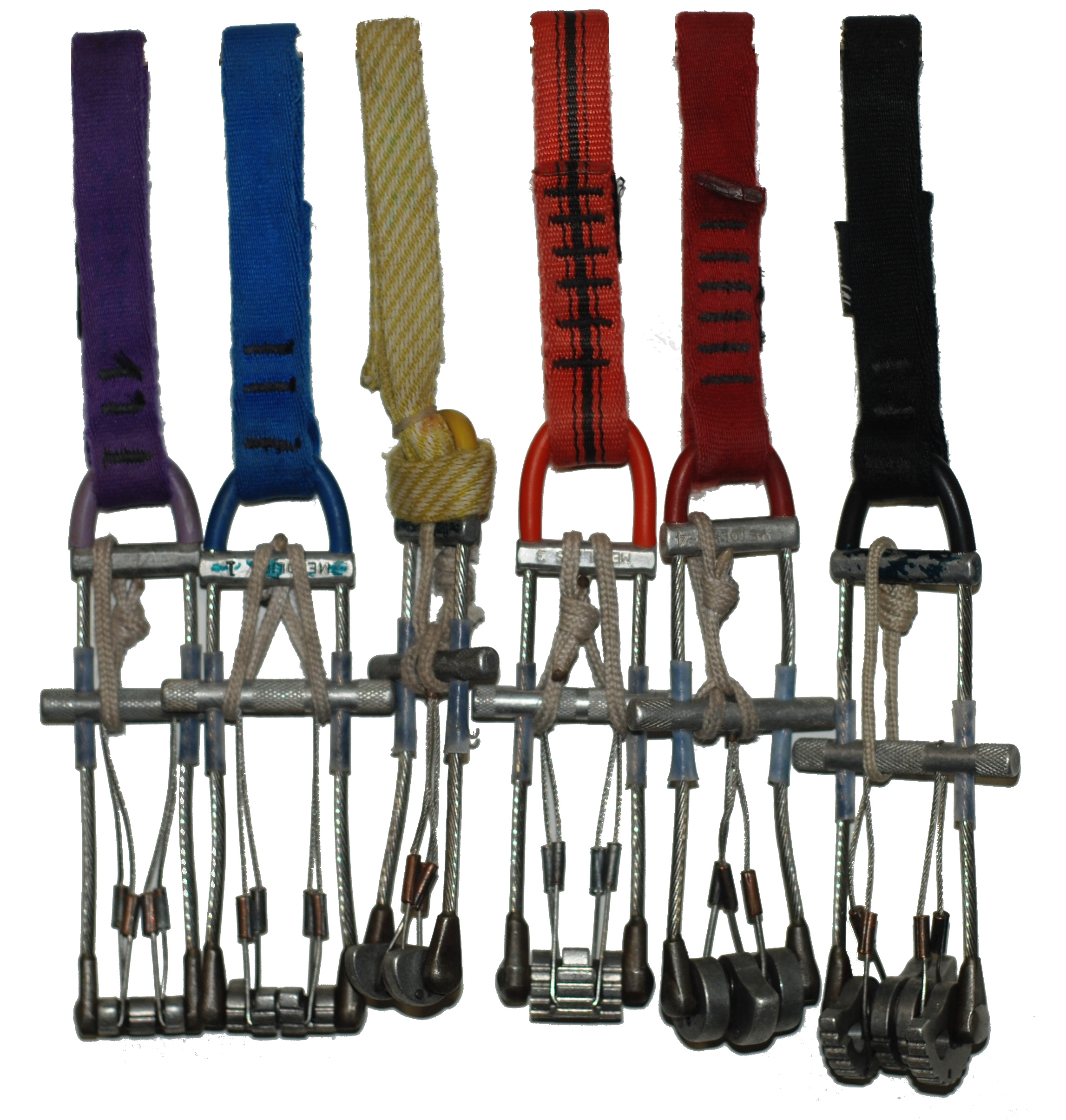
Metolius cams from 1990's.

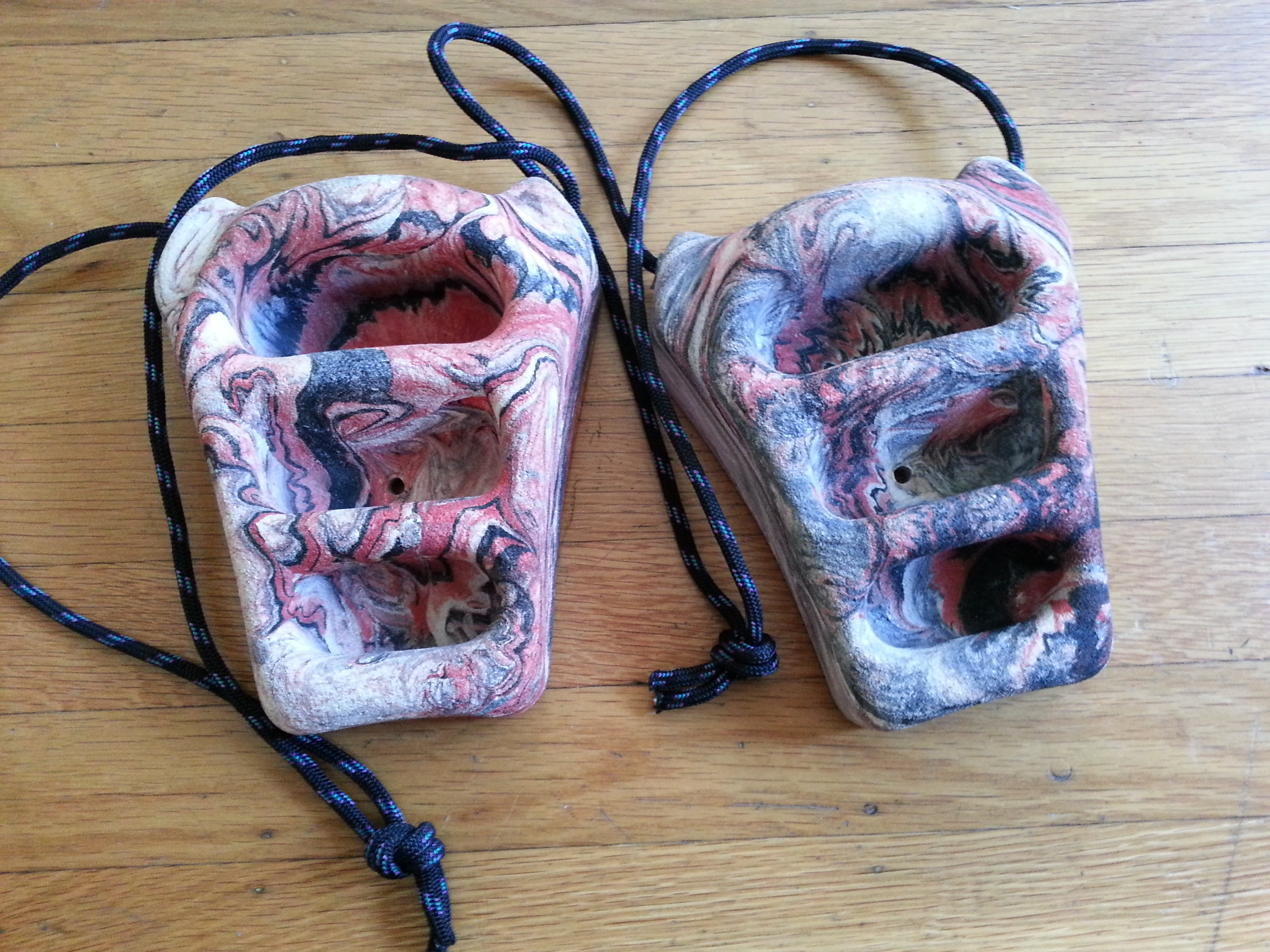
Metolius Rock Rings

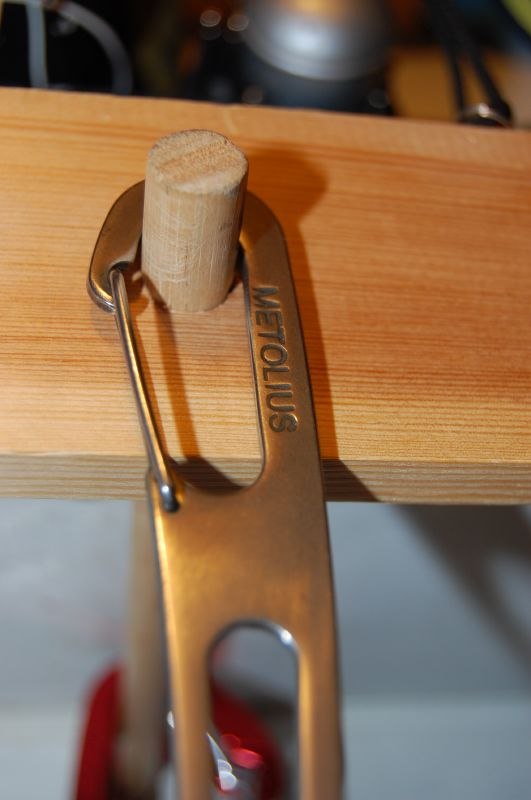
Nut Tool - Metolius Extractor

Metolius Climbing is an American rock climbing gear manufacturer. Named after the Metolius River in Oregon, USA, it is headquartered in the city of Bend, Oregon.

The company was started in 1983 by Doug Philips in his garage. It got its impetus through a group of committed climbers who came together to push their limits at Smith Rock in Oregon's high desert. Climbing gear available in the 1980s was limited, so they decided to design and build their own equipment, which quickly grew into a business. In 2010 Metolius is employing about 45 people in Bend, many of them climbers. Company mission statement is “by climbers for climbers”. In the last decade, some of the production like manufacturing of carabiners were moved overseas.

== Present day ==
Metolius is one of the leading manufacturers of climbing gear, including rock climbing, big wall and bouldering gear. In 2016 it was manufacturing wide range of climbing equipment, including: spring-loaded camming devices, climbing nuts and hexcentrics, belay devices, portaledges, harnesses, carabiners, slings, helmets, haul bags, crash pads, and artificial climbing holds.
