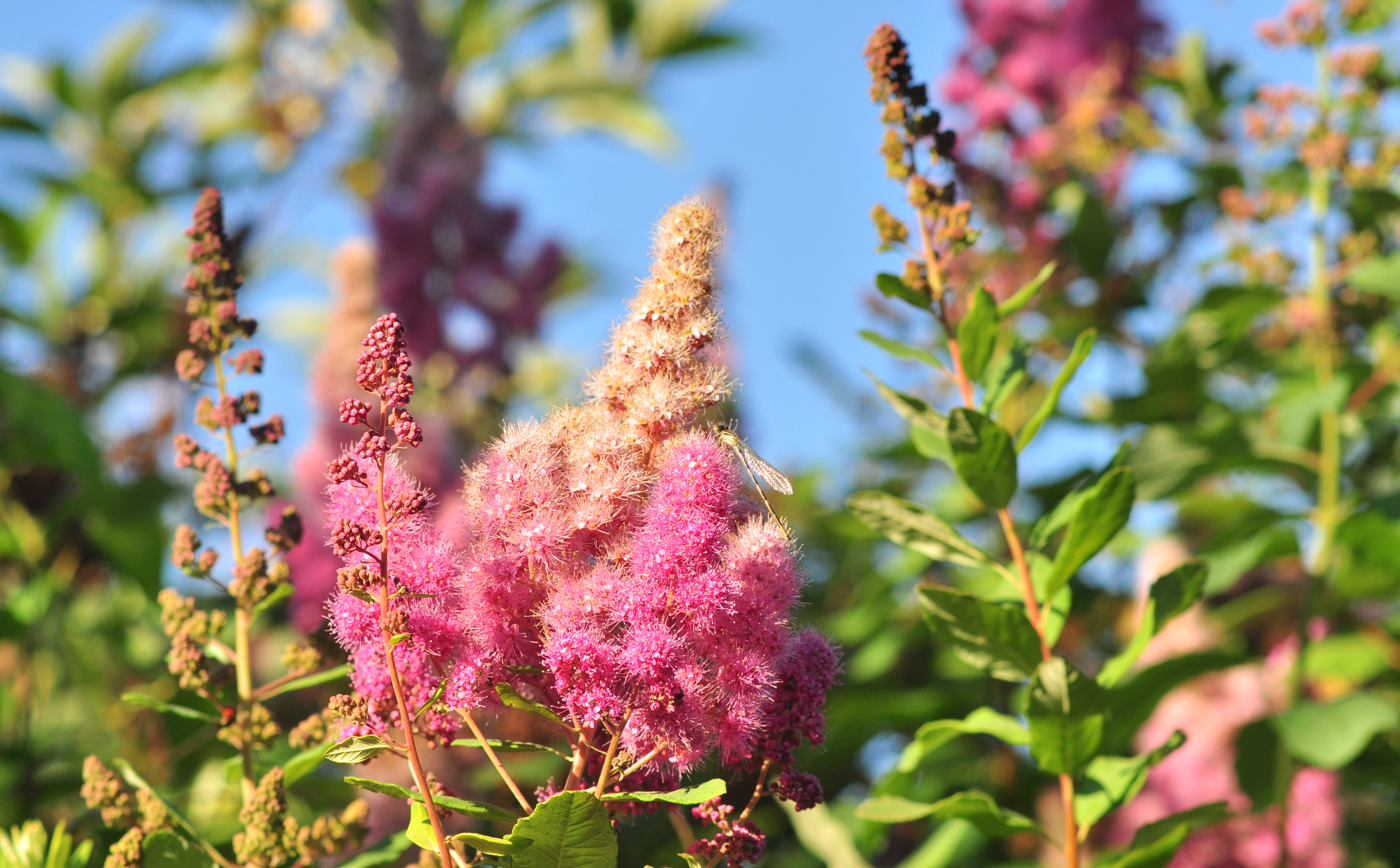

Conservation status
- Secure (NatureServe)

Scientific classification
- Kingdom: Plantae
- Clade: Embryophytes
- Clade: Tracheophytes
- Clade: Angiosperms
- Clade: Eudicots
- Clade: Rosids
- Order: Rosales
- Family: Rosaceae
- Genus: Spiraea
- Species: S. douglasii

Binomial name
- Spiraea douglasii Hook.

Synonyms
- Drimopogon douglasii (Hook.) B.D.Jacks.; Drimopogon menziesii (Hook.) B.D.Jacks.; Spiraea fulvescens auct.

= Spiraea douglasii =

Species of flowering plant

The hot pink-colored inflorescence of the Douglas' spirea plant.

Spiraea douglasii is a species of flowering plant in the rose family. Common names include hardhack, hardhack steeplebush, Douglas' spirea, douglasspirea, steeplebush, and rose spirea. It is native to western North America and is an invasive species in other locales.

The specific epithet douglasii honors Scottish botanist David Douglas, who is noted for cataloguing numerous species native to the American west.

== Description ==
Spiraea douglasii is a woolly shrub growing 0.91–1.83 metres (3–6 feet) tall from rhizomes, forming dense riverside thickets.

The leaves are 2.5–10.2 centimetres (1–4 inches) long and toothed towards the tips. They are alternately arranged, and the undersides are whitish with prominent veins.

Large clusters of small, deep pink flowers form spires in early summer, later turning dark and persisting. The seeds are 2 millimetres (1/16 in) long and are dispersed by animals and strong winds.

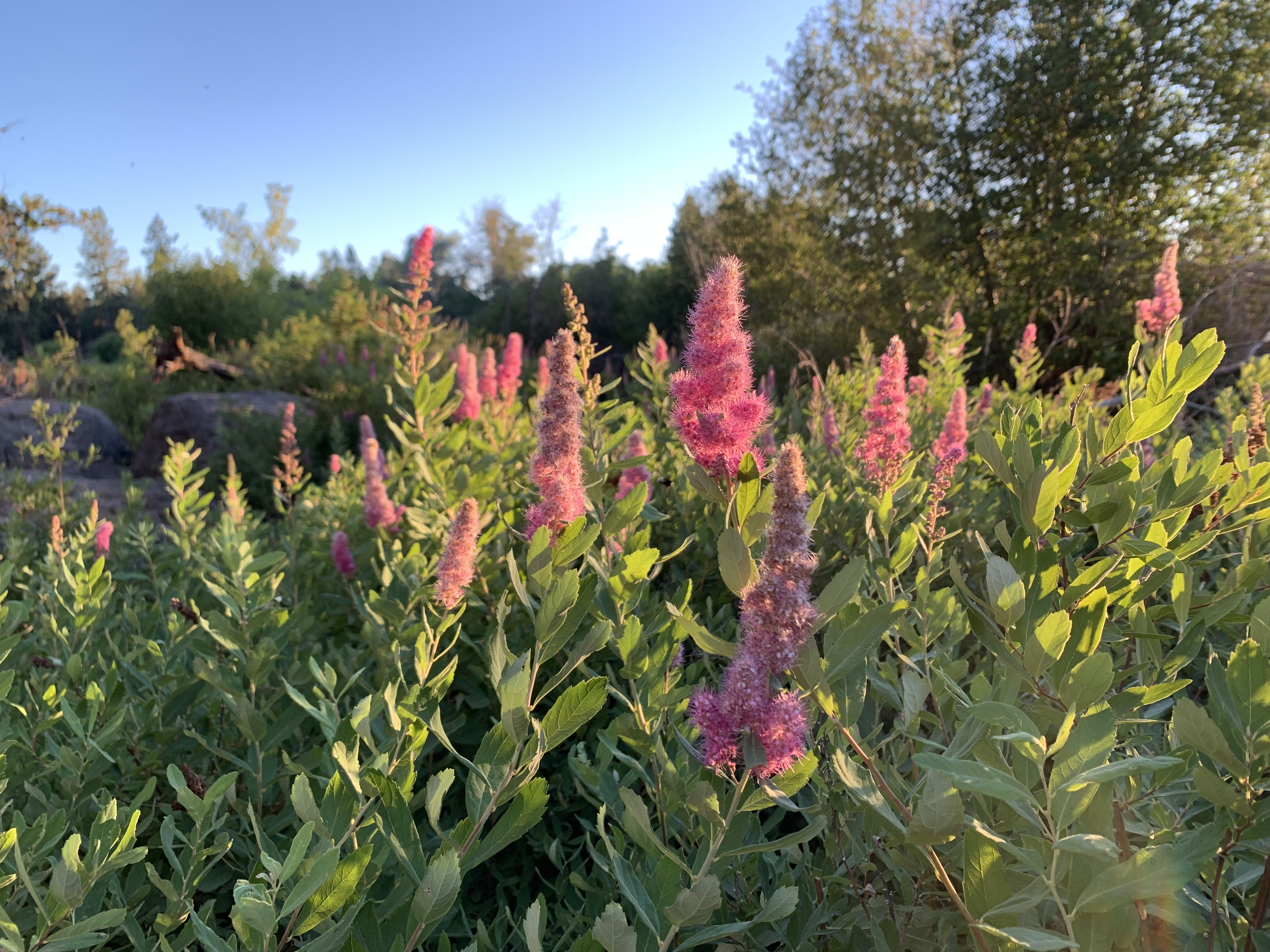
Part of a field in Bend, Oregon

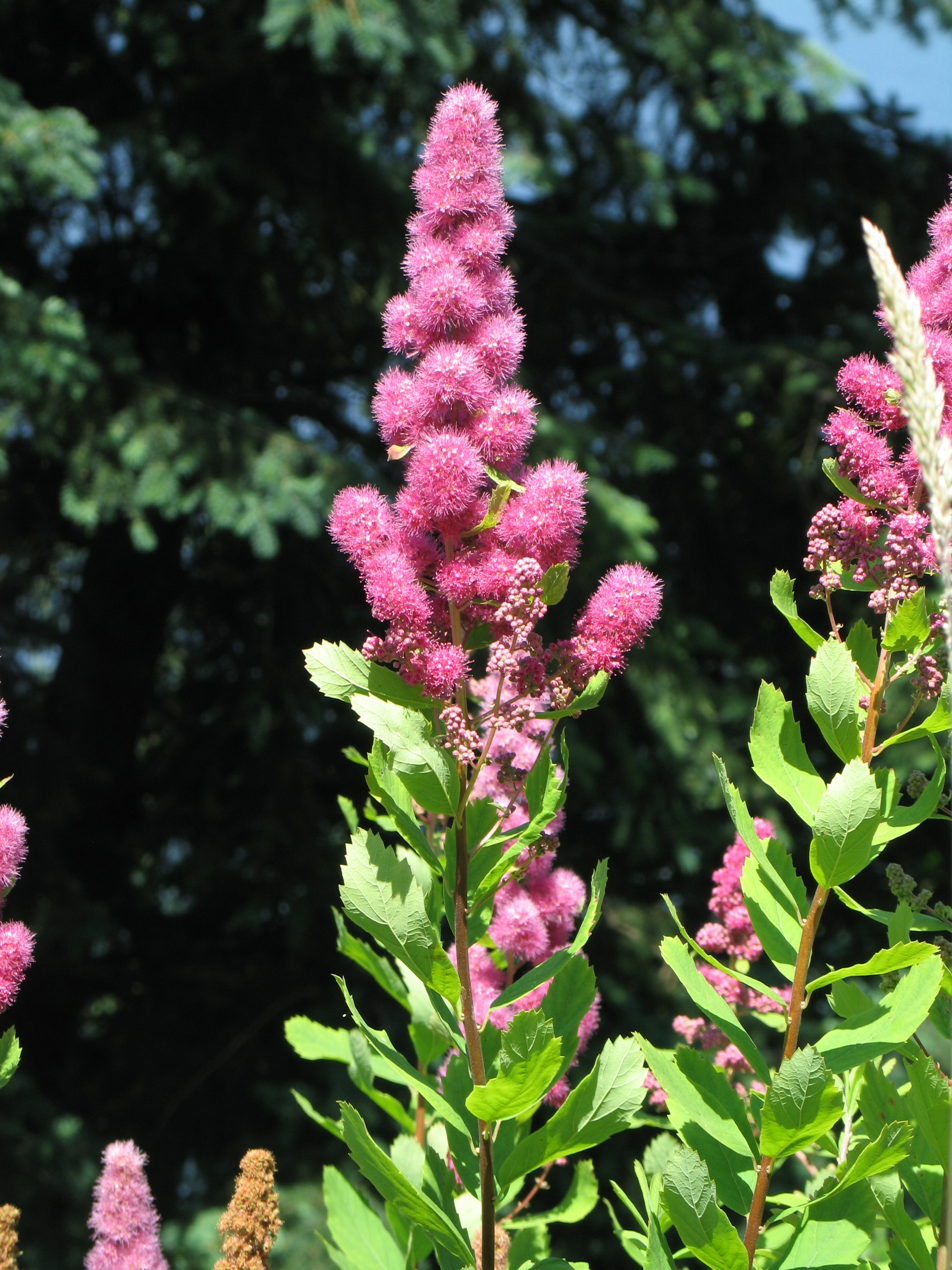
Canadian flower

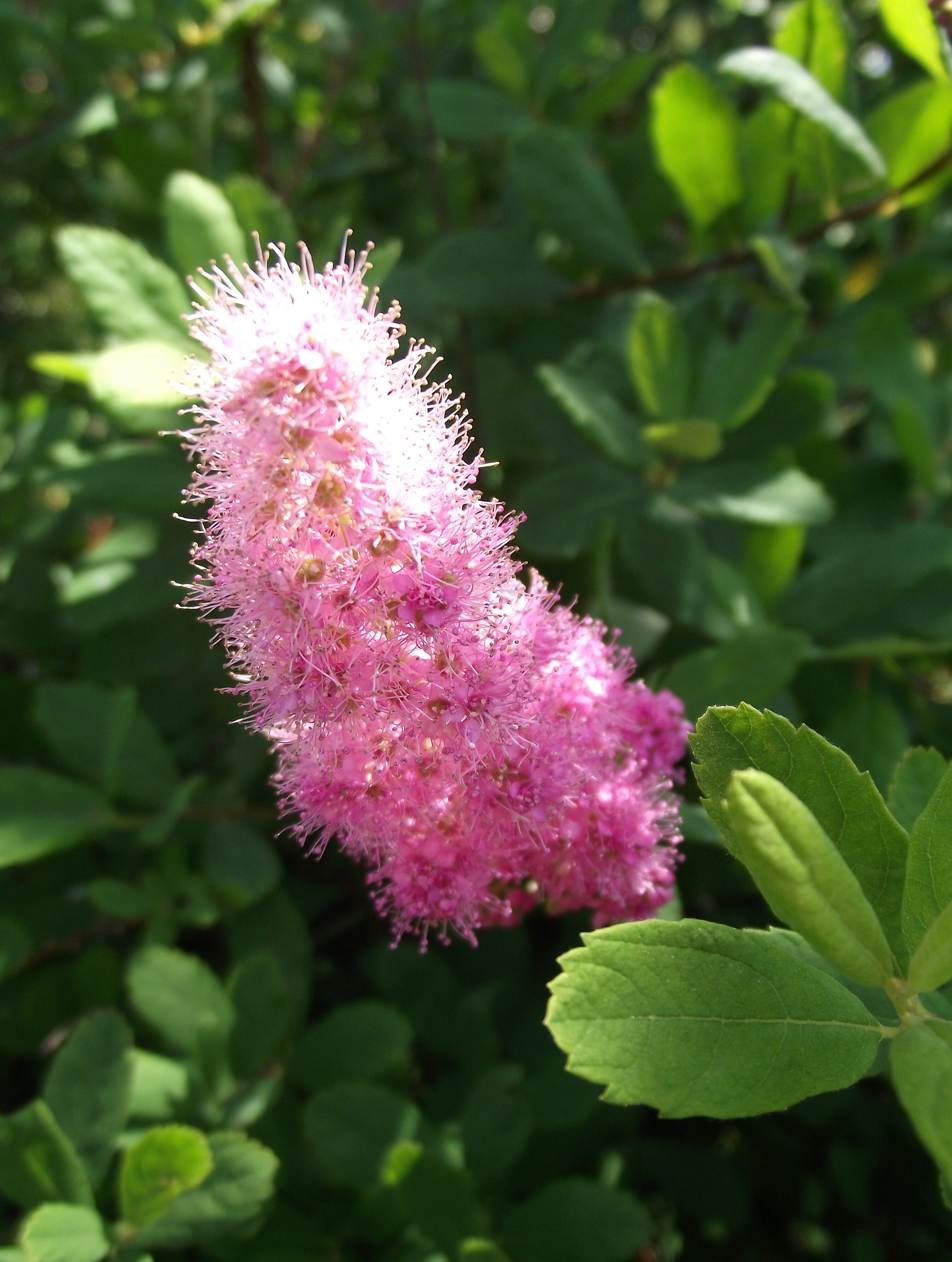
Californian close-up

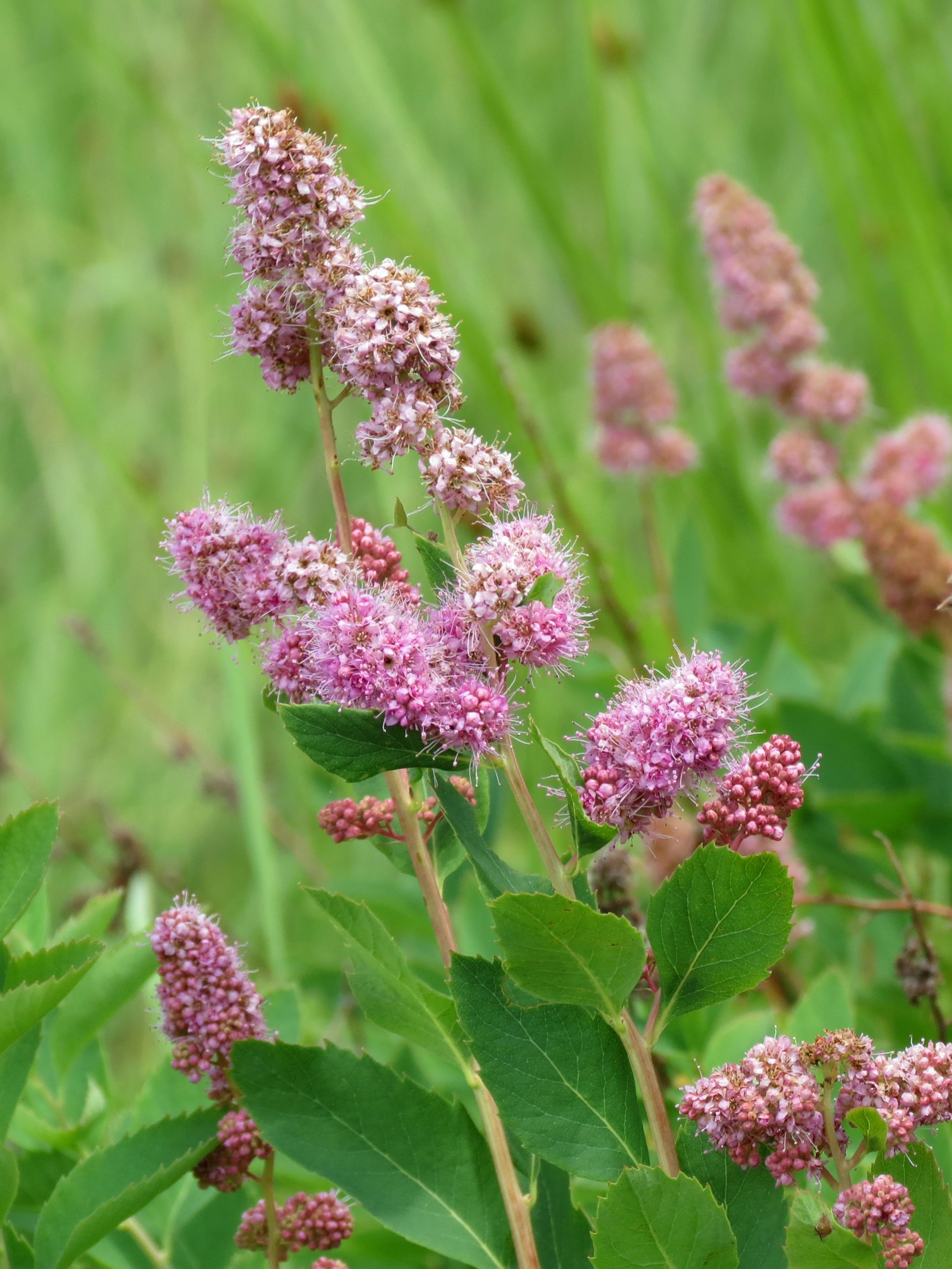
Late summer

== Distribution and habitat ==
The plant is native to western North America from Alaska to California. It has spread to many other places as an invasive species. It was introduced to Europe in 1803, and is especially invasive in Denmark and Latvia. It is also found in France, Ireland, Slovenia, Sweden, the United Kingdom, Belgium, Germany and Poland.

It occurs most often in riparian habitat types, such as swamps, streambanks, bogs and mudflats. It grows best on moist or semiwet soils with good drainage. It tolerates a variety of soil types as well as gravelly substrates.

Spirea is shade-intolerant, and therefore grows primarily in open marshes among sedges, horsetails, wild blueberries, and other swamp flora, as well as in seral communities.

== Ecology ==
The species is moderately fire-resistant, as many of the marshes across its native range would historically dry up by midsummer and be susceptible to fire. If the above-ground portion of the plant is killed, it can sprout from the stem base or rhizomes after a wildfire.

Spirea foliage is browsed by black-tailed deer but is not well liked by livestock, who only eat them occasionally. The flowers provide nectar for hummingbirds, and small birds eat the seeds which persist into the winter when food is less plentiful. The plant provides nesting habitat for birds like marsh wrens and is a component of grizzly bear habitat.

The species may hybridize with white spirea (S. betulifolia) to form pyramid spirea (S. x pyramidata Greene).

=== As an invasive species ===
Where it is invasive, S. douglasii decreases biodiversity, colonizing wetlands with dense monocultural thickets to the detriment of other plants.

== Uses ==
Indigenous peoples used the plant for making brooms and hanging seafood to cook.

The plant is used as an ornamental in landscaping, where it grows best in sunny, moist places. Spirea is recommended for riparian revegetation projects in the Pacific Northwest, as it is hardy and grows quickly.
