= Weathering rind =

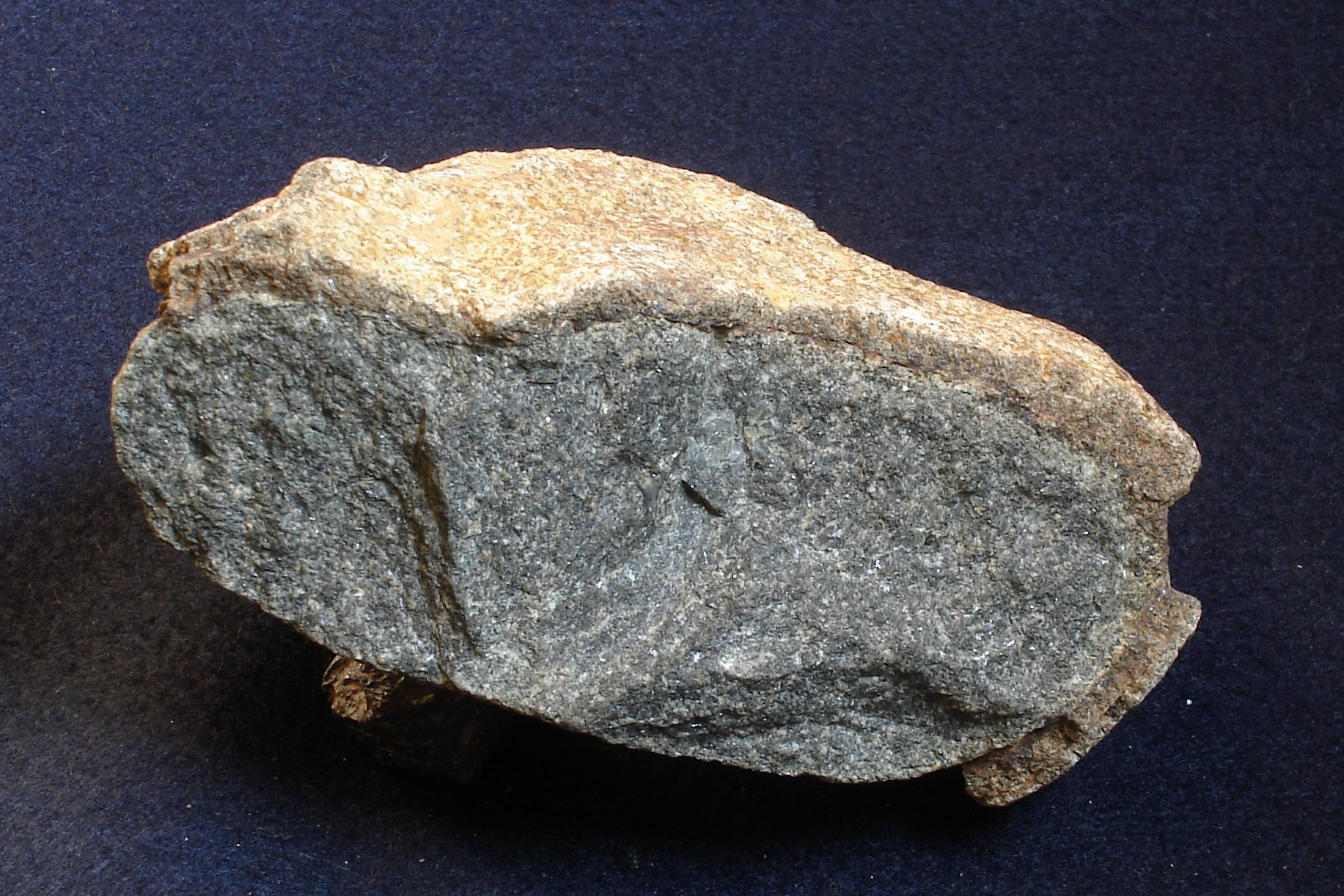
A broken basalt cobble (15 x 10 cm size) showing well-developed weathering rind from Brazil, where chemical weathering is quite active.

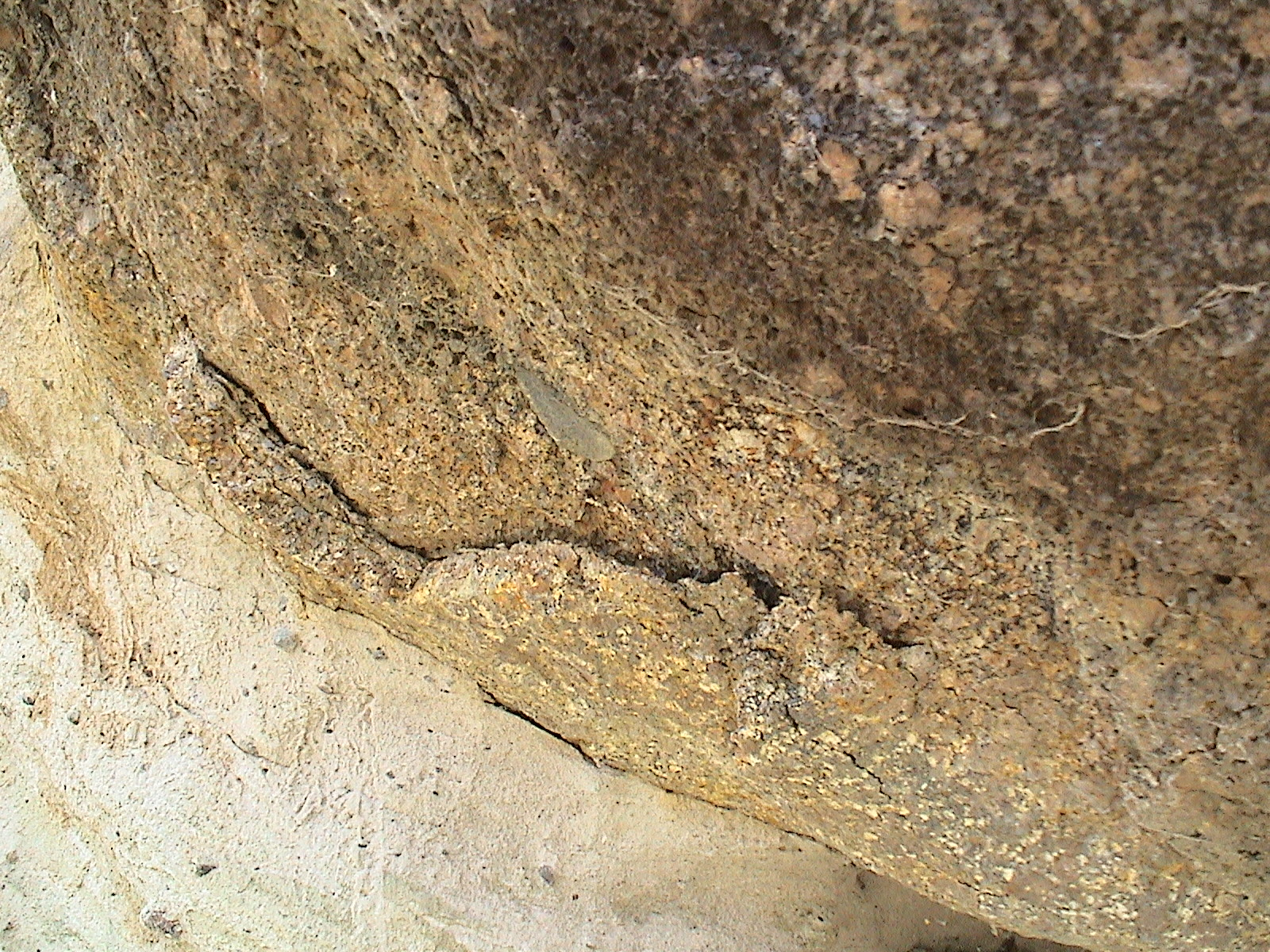
Weathering rind of a large granite glacial erratic eroding out of unconsolidated Permian till, Selwyn Rock, Inman Valley, South Australia

A weathering rind is a discolored, chemically altered, outer zone or layer of a discrete rock fragment formed by the processes of weathering. The inner boundary of a weathering rind approximately parallels the outer surface of the rock fragment in which it has developed. Rock fragments with weathering rinds normally are discrete clasts, ranging in size from pebbles to cobbles or boulders. They typically occur either lying on the surface of the ground or buried within sediments such as alluvium, colluvium, or glacial till. A weathering rind represents the alteration of the outer portion of a rock by exposure to air or near surface groundwater over a period of time. Typically, a weathering rind may be enriched with either iron or manganese (or both), and silica, and oxidized to a yellowish red to reddish color. Often a weathering rind exhibits multiple bands of differing colors.

Although sometimes confused with weathering rinds, spheroidal weathering is a different type of chemical weathering in which spherical layers of weathered material progressively develop in situ around blocks of jointed bedrock beneath the Earth's surface, rather than in reworked and transported clasts such as cobbles and boulders.

== Dating using weathering rinds ==
Weathering rinds have a long history of being used to determine the relative age of either Quaternary sediments or landforms. This is done by comparing the thickness of weathering rinds of gravel composed of similar rock types. Deposits containing gravel with thicker weathering rinds are interpreted to be older than deposits containing rocks with thinner weathering rinds. Sedimentary deposits containing gravel with weathering rinds of the same thickness are interpreted to be approximately contemporaneous in age. The use of weathering rinds in relative dating is widely used in Arctic, Antarctic, and alpine regions and in the correlation of glacial moraines and tills and fluvial sediments and terraces.

In addition, weathering rinds have been used to determine the absolute amount of time gravel-size rock has been exposed to the weathering processes. This technique was proposed by Cernohouz and Solc who first argued that the relationship between the thickness of a weathering-rind thickness and the time it took to form is expressed by a logarithmic function. This is done by determining the absolute age of sedimentary deposits containing either gravel-size rocks or artifacts using absolute dating methods such as C^{14} and measuring the weathering-rind thickness of rocks of similar lithology. The dates obtained from absolute dating techniques and measurements of weathering rind thicknesses are then used to construct an age versus thickness curve for dating rocks in other sedimentary deposits. This dating method has often been applied to glacial deposits in alpine regions.

=== Obsidian hydration ===
Obsidian hydration dating is a type of dating that uses the weathering rind that develops within artifacts or gravel that are composed of obsidian. When fresh obsidian is exposed to air it typically contains less than 1% water. Over time, a weathering rind, known as an obsidian hydration band and composed of hydrated glass forms, as water slowly diffuses from a broken surface, which is normally associated with manufacture of an artifact, into the obsidian. The thickness of this band can be seen, and measured, using various techniques such as a high-power microscope with 40-80 power magnification, depth profiling with SIMS (secondary ion mass spectrometry), and IR-PAS (infra red photoacoustic spectroscopy).

The determination of absolute age from the thickness of an obsidian hydration band is complicated and problematic. First, the rate at which the hydration of glass occurs varies significantly with temperature. The rate at which the obsidian hydration band forms increases with temperature. Second, the rate of hydration and obsidian hydration band formation varies with the geochemistry of the obsidian, including the intrinsic water content, seems to affect the rate of hydration. Finally, water vapor pressure may also affect the rate of obsidian hydration. If the rate of obsidian hydration band can be controlled for the obsidian's geochemistry (e.g., the "source"), temperature (usually approximated using an "effective hydration temperature" or EHT coefficient) and other factors, it might be possible to date an artifact using the obsidian hydration technique.

The presence or absence of an obsidian hydration band has been used to distinguish prehistoric obsidian debitage from obsidian debitage produced by modern flintknappers. This distinction can be made because it takes about 70 years for a band to enlarge sufficiently so that it is readily detectable on a freshly flaked surface of a piece of obsidian. For example, the basis of the lack of development of obsidian hydration bands, it was concluded that modern flintknappers brought specimens of obsidian to the Poverty Point Site in Louisiana.

== See also ==
- Liesegang rings
