= Metolius River =

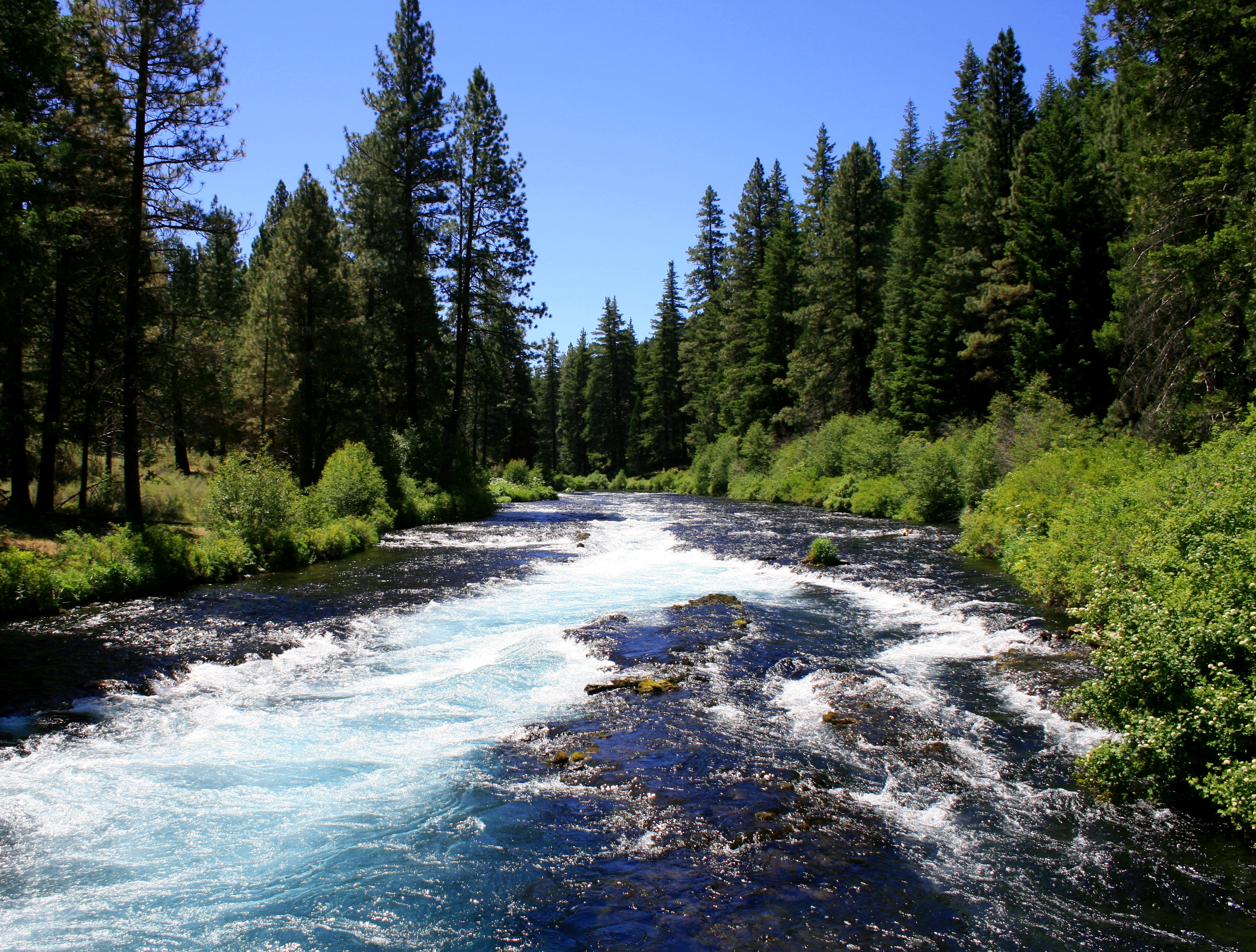
- Wizard Falls on the Metolius River, where the river drops over a ledge

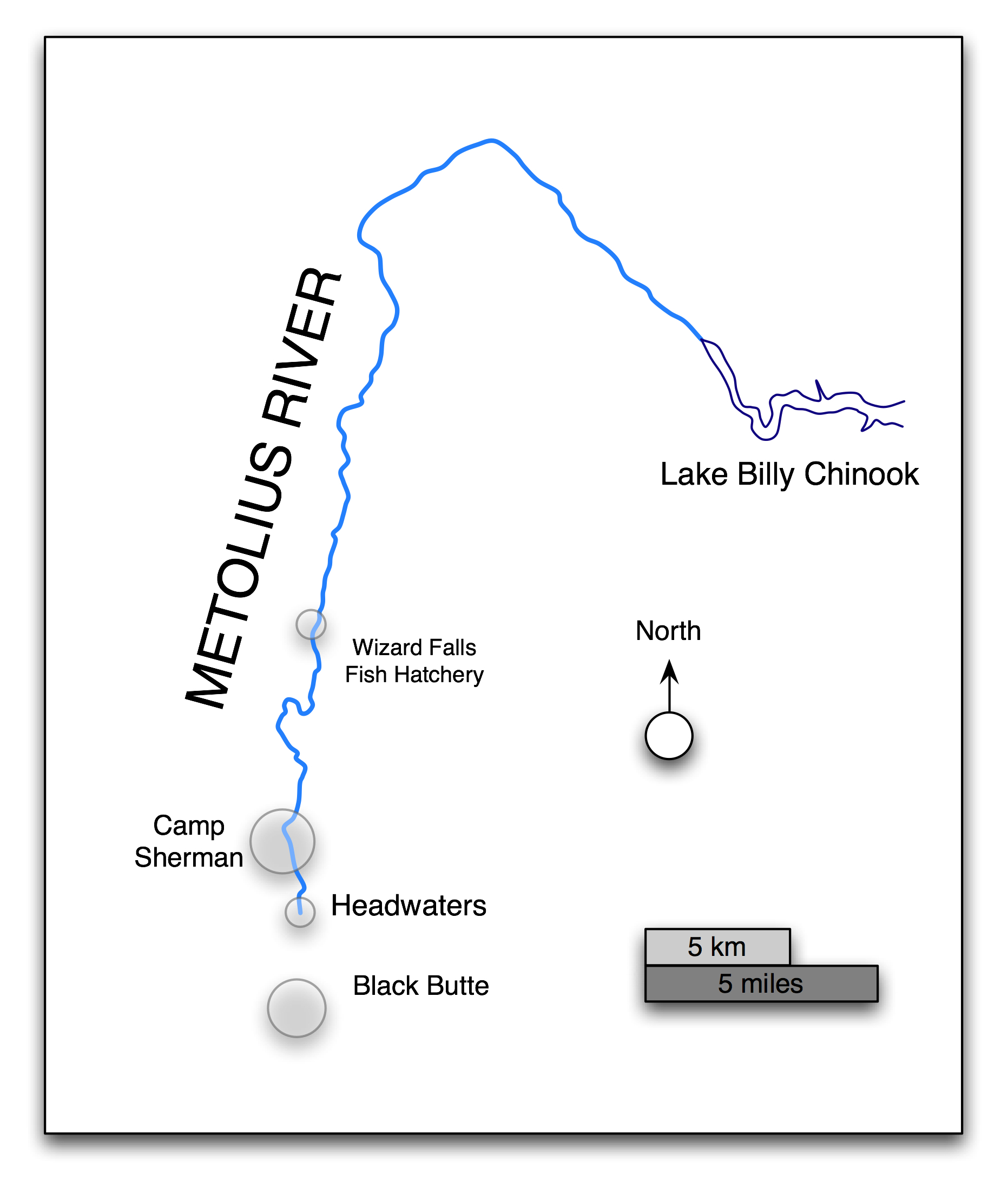
- Map of the river course

Physical characteristics
- Source
  - location: Metolius Springs
  - coordinates: 44.427617°N 121.635330°W
  - elevation: 3,000 ft (910 m)
- Mouth
  - location: Lake Billy Chinook
  - coordinates: 44.597619°N 121.286991°W
  - elevation: 1,945 ft (593 m)
- Length: 29 mi (47 km)
- Basin size: 315 sq mi (820 km^{2})
- Discharge
  - average: 1,497 cu ft/s (42.4 m^{3}/s)

National Wild and Scenic River
- Type: Scenic, Recreational
- Designated: October 28, 1988

The Metolius River (pronounced muh TOLL ee us) is a tributary of the Deschutes River in Central Oregon, United States. The river flows north from springs near Black Butte, then turns sharply east, descending through a series of gorges before ending in the western end of Lake Billy Chinook. The unincorporated community of Camp Sherman lies astride the southern end of the river. The name of the river comes from the Warm Springs or Sahaptin word mitula, meaning white salmon and referring to a light colored Chinook salmon and not a whitefish.

The river's drainage basin is 315 square miles (820 km^{2}) in area and, according to at least one estimate, contains 110 miles (180 km) of perennial streams, 324 miles (521 km) of intermittent streams, 42 lakes, and 121 ponds.

== Headwaters ==
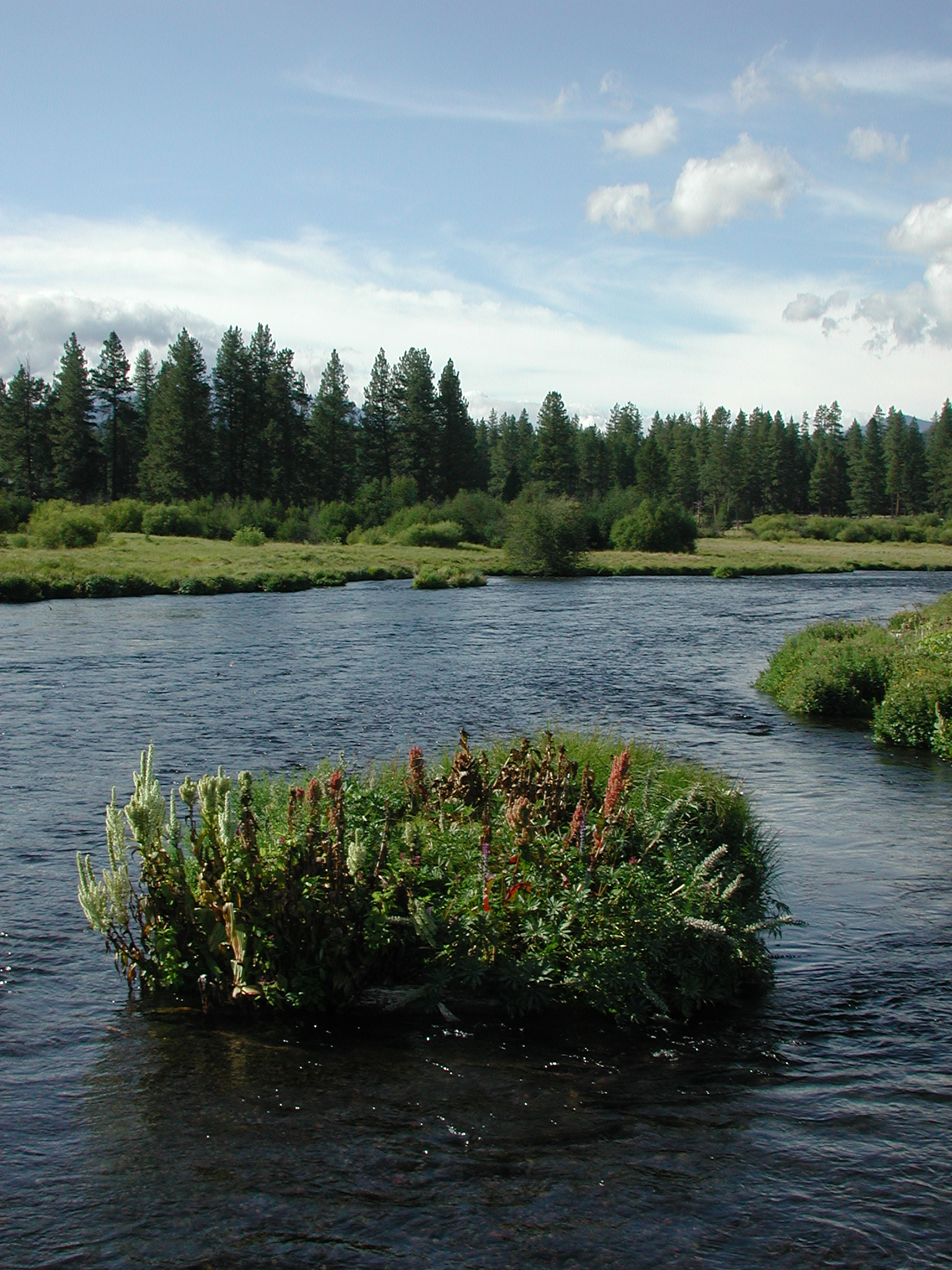
The Metolius River is fed by numerous springs and creeks along its route.

The headwaters of the river are at Metolius Springs, where the river emerges from two clusters of springs at the base of Black Butte. Water flows to these springs from the drainage basin around Black Butte Ranch, several miles to the south. The elevation of the drainage basin is 300 feet (91 m) above that of the springs, forming a natural standpipe that tends to stabilize the river's rate of flow.

As a consequence, the water level in the Metolius River is relatively constant. The rate of flow at the headwaters is approximately 190 cubic metres per minute (6,700 cu ft/min) or 50,000 gallons per minute), although it grows by an additional 2,300 cubic metres per minute (81,000 cu ft/min) or 600,000 gallons per minute) by the time the river reaches Lake Billy Chinook. Similarly, the water temperature is also stable; at the river source, the water temperature is a consistent 48 °F (8.9 °C).

== General ==
The Metolius River flows 28.6 miles (46.0 km) from Metolius Springs through the Deschutes National Forest, emptying into Lake Billy Chinook and ultimately the Deschutes River. The upper 11.5 miles (18.5 km) of the river are popular for catch-and-release fishing, whitewater rafting, picnicking, and camping. The lower 17 miles (27 km) are on the boundary of the Warm Springs Indian Reservation, and flow by "a primitive area where motorized vehicles are not allowed."

The Metolius River was officially designated a National Wild and Scenic River in 1988.

Many of the summer homes along the Metolius River are constructed on United States Forest Service land, under provisions of a 1915 act of Congress, and are generally required to be set back from the river at least 50 feet (15 m), allowing public access to the river.

In 2009, the Oregon legislature passed the Metolius Protection Act, designating 448 acres of the river basin as an "Area of Critical State Concern (ACSC)", preventing large-scale development on the land and protecting its wildlife.

== Wildlife ==
The Metolius River supports a broad cross-section of the wildlife present in the Central Oregon region. The river itself is home to several fish species, including rainbow trout, bull trout, kokanee salmon and mountain whitefish. Larger animals including river otters and beaver inhabit the areas in and immediately around the river, and larger land mammals, including mule deer, elk, black bear, and cougar range in the surrounding area. Migratory waterbirds such as the mallard and the Canada goose are common in the spring and summer, as are raptors such as the osprey and the red-tailed hawk. The white-headed woodpecker, generally rare and of interest to many birders, is quite common in several areas along the river.

== Recreation ==
Sport fishing for rainbow trout and bull trout is fly-fishing only on the upper Metolius—and catch-and-release, with barbless hooks. A number of small resorts and shops cater to fishermen and other visitors, principally in the community of Camp Sherman.

Hiking and horseback riding are popular activities in the area, particularly on the upper, southern portion of the river, with trails extending up and down the river and into the forests on both sides. There are also a number of developed campgrounds on the banks of the river. Fishing, rafting, hunting and cross-country skiing are all popular seasonal activities.

The Wizard Falls Fish Hatchery is about 10.6 miles (17.1 km) north of the headwaters. This hatchery raises rainbow trout, kokanee, and salmon. The hatchery is open to visitors, with various species of trout and other fish on display in ponds.

== Coordinates ==
Coordinates from GNIS list one point per 7.5 minute map. The source and mouth are not repeated here.

seq num	location	usgs map
2	44.591784°N 121.376161°W	Fly Creek
3	44.624839°N 121.480332°W	Metolius Bench
4	44.635394°N 121.501166°W	Shitike Butte
5	44.624283°N 121.600058°W	Prairie Farm Spring
6	44.540117°N 121.626723°W	Candle Creek

== See also ==
- List of National Wild and Scenic Rivers
- List of Oregon rivers
- The National Forest Foundation's Conservation Plan for the Metolius River
