= Black Butte Ranch, Oregon =

Unincorporated community in the state of Oregon, United States

- Census-designated place
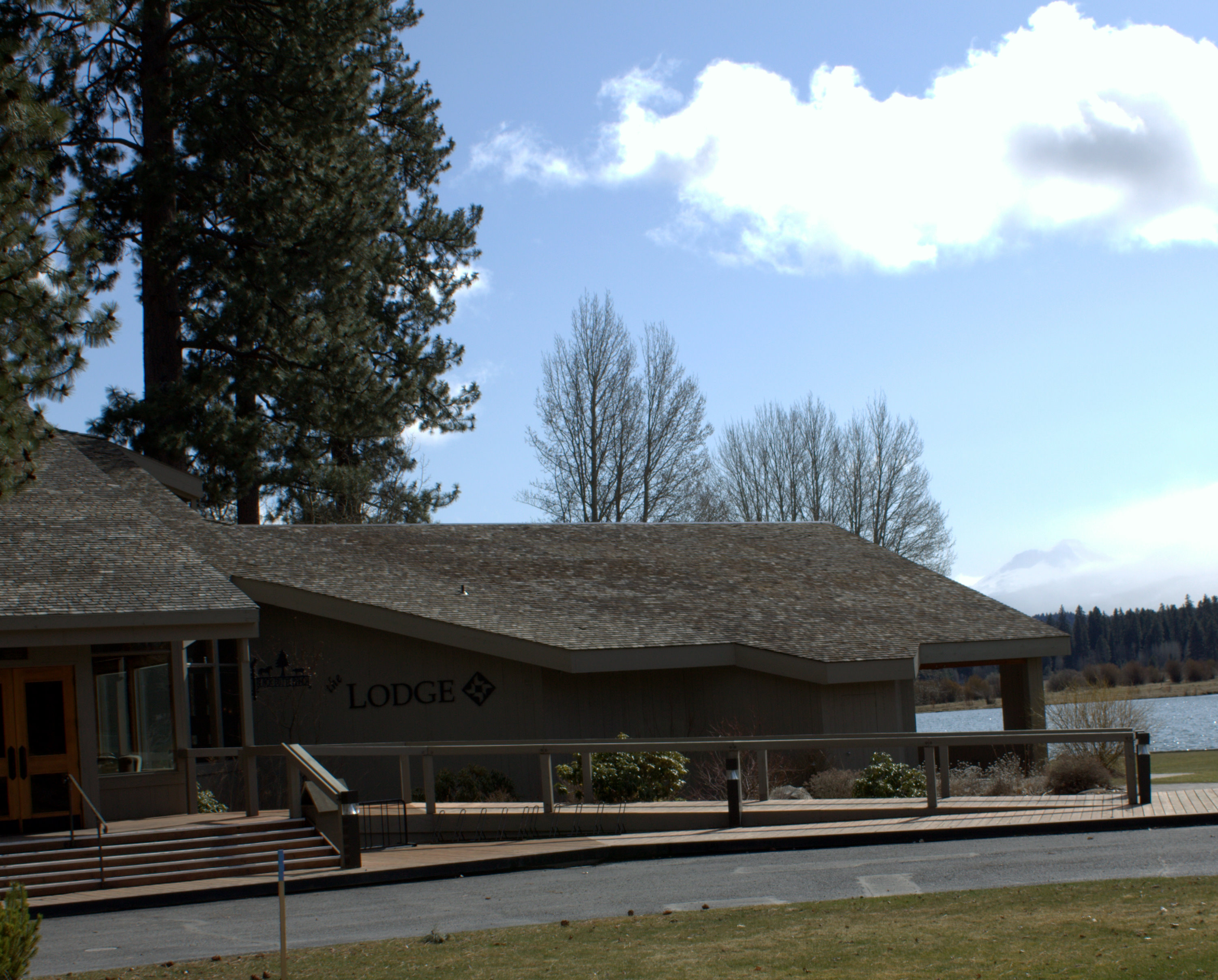
- Black Butte Ranch Lodge with South Sister in background
- Interactive map of Black Butte Ranch, Oregon
- Coordinates: 44°22′18″N 121°39′10″W
- Country: United States
- State: Oregon
- County: Deschutes

Area
  - Total: 8.22 sq mi (21.29 km^{2})
  - Land: 8.20 sq mi (21.23 km^{2})
  - Water: 0.023 sq mi (0.06 km^{2})
- Elevation: 3,376 ft (1,029 m)

Population (2020)
  - Total: 260
  - Density: 31.7/sq mi (12.25/km^{2})
- Time zone: UTC-8 (Pacific)
  - Summer (DST): UTC-7 (Pacific)
- ZIP code: 97759
- Area code: 541
- FIPS code: 41-06650
- GNIS feature ID: 2584407
- Website: www.blackbutteranch.com

Black Butte Ranch is a census-designated place (CDP) and unincorporated private resort community in Deschutes County, Oregon, United States. It is located in the Cascade Range, 8 miles (13 km) northwest of Sisters. As of the 2020 census, Black Butte Ranch had a population of 260. Black Butte Ranch allows public access to its restaurant, golf courses and horse stables, but is primarily oriented to its year-round residents and seasonal guests.

== History ==
The planned community of Black Butte Ranch was developed starting in 1970 by Brooks Resources, a subsidiary of Brooks-Scanlon Lumber Company on the site of the former Black Butte cattle ranch directly south of Black Butte. The first residents arrived in 1971 and Black Butte Ranch post office was established the same year.

== Geography ==
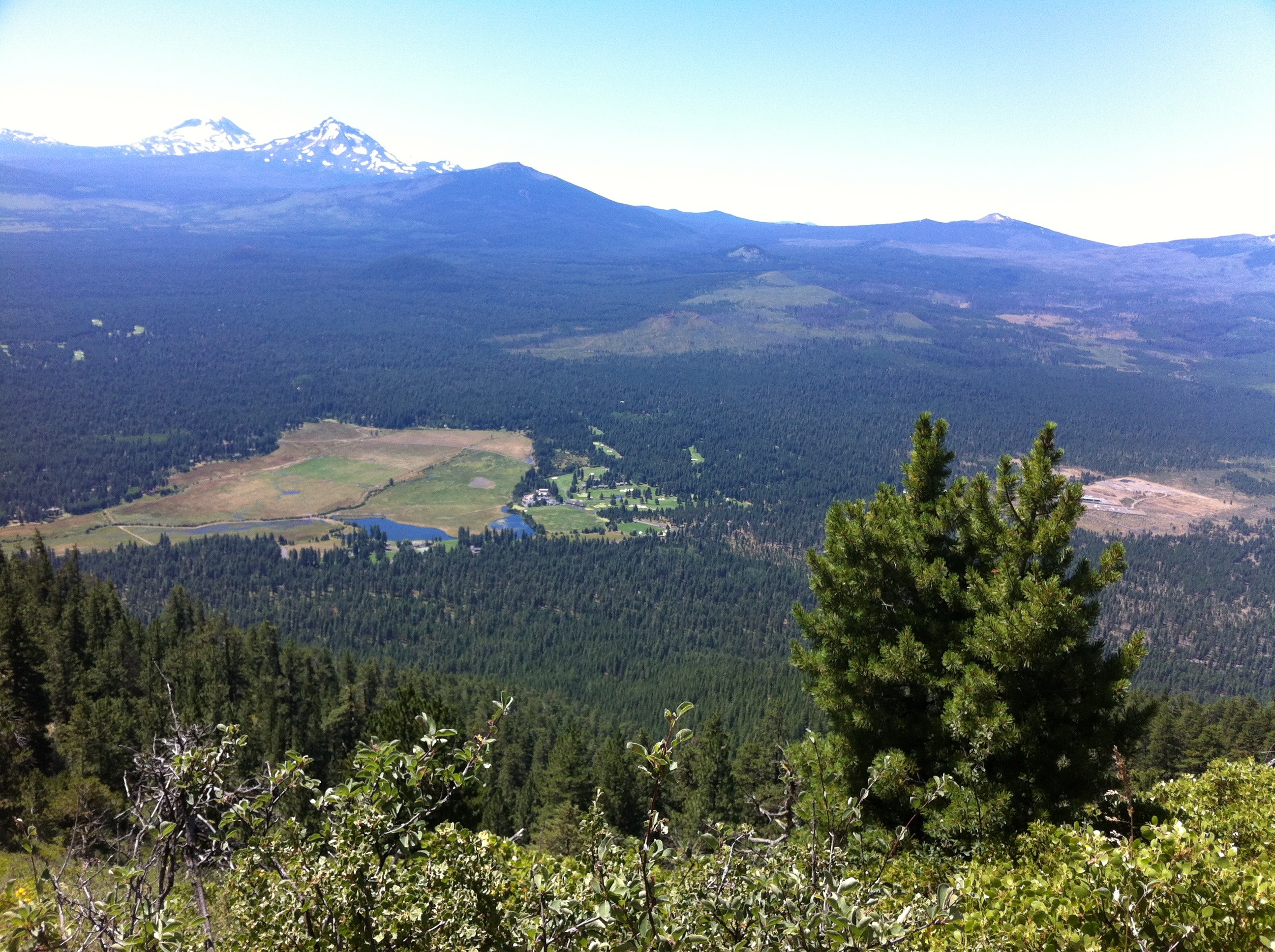
A view of the ranch from atop Black Butte

Black Butte Ranch is located in northwestern Deschutes County to the southwest of U.S. Route 20; it is surrounded by Deschutes National Forest. The 6,436-foot (1,962 m) summit of Black Butte overlooks the community to the northeast.

According to the United States Census Bureau, the CDP has a total area of 8.2 square miles (21.3 km^{2}), of which 0.02 square miles (0.06 km^{2}), or 0.29%, is water. The area drains east via Black Butte Swamp to Indian Ford Creek, then Whychus Creek, then to the Deschutes River, a north-flowing tributary of the Columbia River.

== Demographics ==
Historical population
| Census | Pop. | Note | %± |
|---|---|---|---|
| 2020 | 260 | | — |
U.S. Decennial Census

In 2001, the estimated population of full-time, year-round residents was 337. The population was 366 at the 2010 census. During the peak tourist season, the population, including guests who do not own property but are renting residences within the community, is estimated to rise to 5,000.

== Wildfire ==
Black Butte Ranch has been threatened by many wildfires, especially since 2002, when the Cache Mountain Fire burned two homes in the northwest corner of the ranch. Black Butte Ranch was once again threatened by the B&B Complex Fires in 2003, and in 2007 the GW Fire came within a quarter of a mile of some homes on the ranch.

== Education ==
It is in the Sisters School District 6.
