= Arnold Lava Tube System =

Cave system in Oregon, United States

Coordinates: 43.82°N 121.12°W

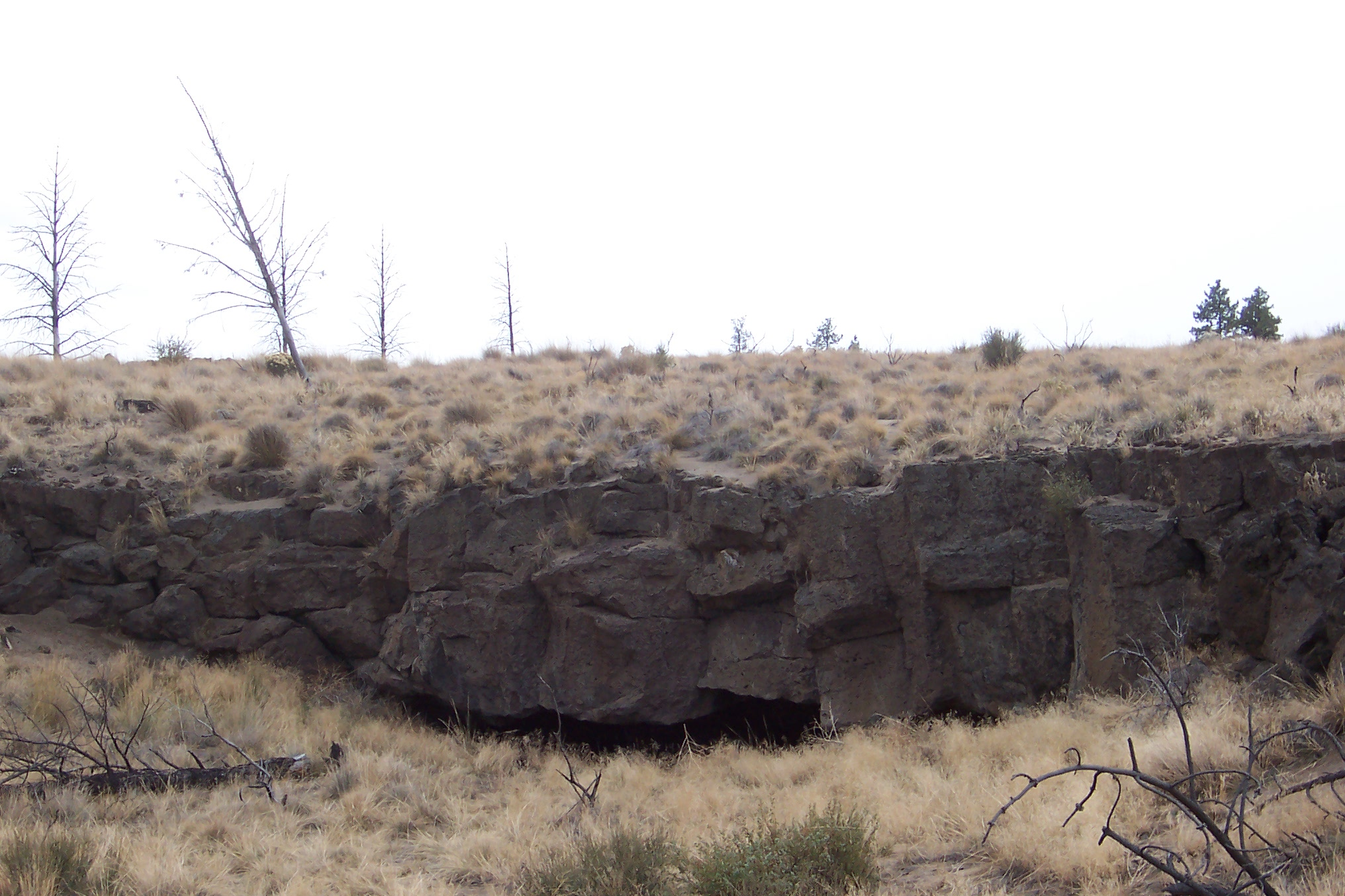
- Entrance to Backbone Cave
- Interactive map of Arnold Lava Tube System
- Location: Deschutes County, Oregon, United States
- Geology: Basalt of Lava Top Butte
- Difficulty: Easy to moderate
- Access: Varied
- Cave survey: Mostly complete

The Arnold Lava Tube System (or Arnold system) is series of lava tubes in Deschutes County, Oregon, in the United States. It is located several miles southeast of the city of Bend. The system starts in the Deschutes National Forest on the northern flank of Newberry Volcano, heads northeast onto BLM land before finally terminating on private property near Horse Ridge. The system acted as a conduit for the lavas from Lava Top Butte that later fed the Badlands rootless shield. The lava flow that created the Arnold system is also referred to as the basalt of Lava Top Butte and is related to the Horse Cave lobe which is a lava flow that created the Horse Lava Tube System. The lava flows of Lava Top Butte, the Badlands, the Horse system, and the Arnold system all have a geologic age around 80,000 years old.

== History ==
The system got its name from Ronald Greeley of NASA who named it during his study of lava tubes for the Oregon Department of Geology and Mineral Industries. He based it on one of the first discoveries in the system: Arnold Ice Cave. The cave was discovered by Americans as early as 1889 and referred to as the Crook County Ice Caves. Arnold Ice Cave was also the site of an early ice mining operation. The ice was sold to the city of Bend and relieved the ice market which was cornered by one of the early saloon keepers. At one time, a trench was chopped into the ice by Jim Anderson and Phil Coyner in the 1950s. They gained access to about a half mile of passage. Years later, after the ice mining had ceased, the cave filled back up with ice, and the inner passages in the cave proved to be inaccessible to exploration attempts. Many years later, in the early 1970s, Ronald Greeley, during his research on lava tubes, named one of the caves in the system. Deg Cave was named after the initials of Donald E. Gault, the Branch Chief for Planetology at NASA Ames Research Center.

Though Americans lay claim to the discovery of the caves, they had been known long before to Native Americans and as early as 1370 AD. This was determined from carbon dating nearby Charcoal Cave no. 1.

== Conservation ==
The lava tubes of the Arnold system have long been used by locals for varying purposes including recreational usage. Unfortunately, a major sector of the public remains uneducated and the caves repeatedly suffer from vandalism and human-induced degradation. The Central Oregon Conservation Task Force (COCTF), under the guidance of Larry King and Garry Petrie, documented the abuse of the caves. Rock climbing in and around the caves marred the natural beauty with that of climbing bolts and chalk residue. Reports of Native American rock art being ignored by rock climbers were commonplace. Rock climbers used climbing chalk in and around the sensitive rock art despite posted notice signs. In addition to this, sign defacement, illegal fire pits, and vegetation destruction also occurred. The 1997 year alone resulted in an estimated damage report of $71,000. Eventually, the COCTF removed the climbing bolts from several of the caves in an effort to partially restore the caves to their original state.

In the times past, other kinds of destructive behaviors affected the cave system. Bats were seen as target practice by those who entered the caves with guns. Sometimes bats were killed and their bodies left behind. The caves once used to be large bat habitats, especially for the nationally listed sensitive species, the Townsend's big-eared bat. The caves have been so severely impacted that bat populations in the majority of these caves have dwindled to very small amounts or being nonexistent.

In addition to the endangerment of the native bat species, defacement of the caves is also ubiquitous. One report by a mineral and gem collector notes the removal of rare lava stalagmites from inside Wind Cave in a chamber believed to have been previously unexplored. This same collector also made a habit of removing ancient artifacts from caves in the area. Artifacts from which mankind could have learned about its ancient past.

Today, many people still enjoy the lava tubes and respect their beauty and the creatures that make it their home. Yet, reports still persist of vandalism to the caves. Cave gates have been broken and made useless by those persisting to enter caves during seasonal bat closures. Parties continue to be a problem when individuals enter the caves and litter the ground with garbage, broken glass, and human feces.

Conservation and restoration efforts are ongoing. The United States Forest Service and the Bureau of Land Management, in collaboration with the Oregon High Desert Grotto, maintain the cave system. The goal is to preserve the natural state of caves for bat use and for safe recreational use. The Oregon High Desert Grotto is an affiliate of the National Speleological Society which shares the values of preserving these unique resources. Resources of geological, biological, archaeological, and ecological value.

== Bat closures ==
The caves of the Arnold system are closed during the hibernation period of the bats. The closure for hibernation is from November 1 to April 15. Recently, gates have been installed on many of the caves in an effort to restore the bat habitats, including Bat Cave no. 1.

Bat maternity colonies also exist in a few of the caves, though to what extent they still flourish is not determined. Closures for those caves with maternity colonies is between April 16 and September 30. Maternity colonies have been noted in the past in Wind Cave, Bat Cave, Deg Cave, and Charlie-the-Cave.

== Caves ==
There are 20 caves in the Arnold system. Out of those 20, only 8 are longer than two to three hundred feet.

=== Lava tube caves ===
The major caves of the Arnold system are in this category. Wind Cave is the longest and most difficult to traverse at 3,839 feet in slope length.

Caves include:

- Hidden Forest
- HFBD
- Charcoal Cave no. 1
- Neighboring Cave
- Arnold Ice
- Boulder
- Baker's Bin
- Osseo
- Charlie-the-Cave
- Unnamed
- Backbone
- Deg
- Bat Cave no. 1
- Upwind
- Wind
- Hyphenated
- Pictograph
- Charcoal Cave no. 2
- Stookey Ranch

=== Miscellaneous caves ===
A few other caves exist in the system. They are mostly very small talus caves along the collapse trench walls. One other, Woolhiser Cave, appears to be a rather large surface tube and is offset from the main lava tubes.

== See also ==
- Horse Lava Tube System
- Redmond Caves
- Oregon High Desert Grotto
