= Horse Lava Tube System =

Lava tube system located near Bend, Oregon

Coordinates: 44.1°N 121.2°W

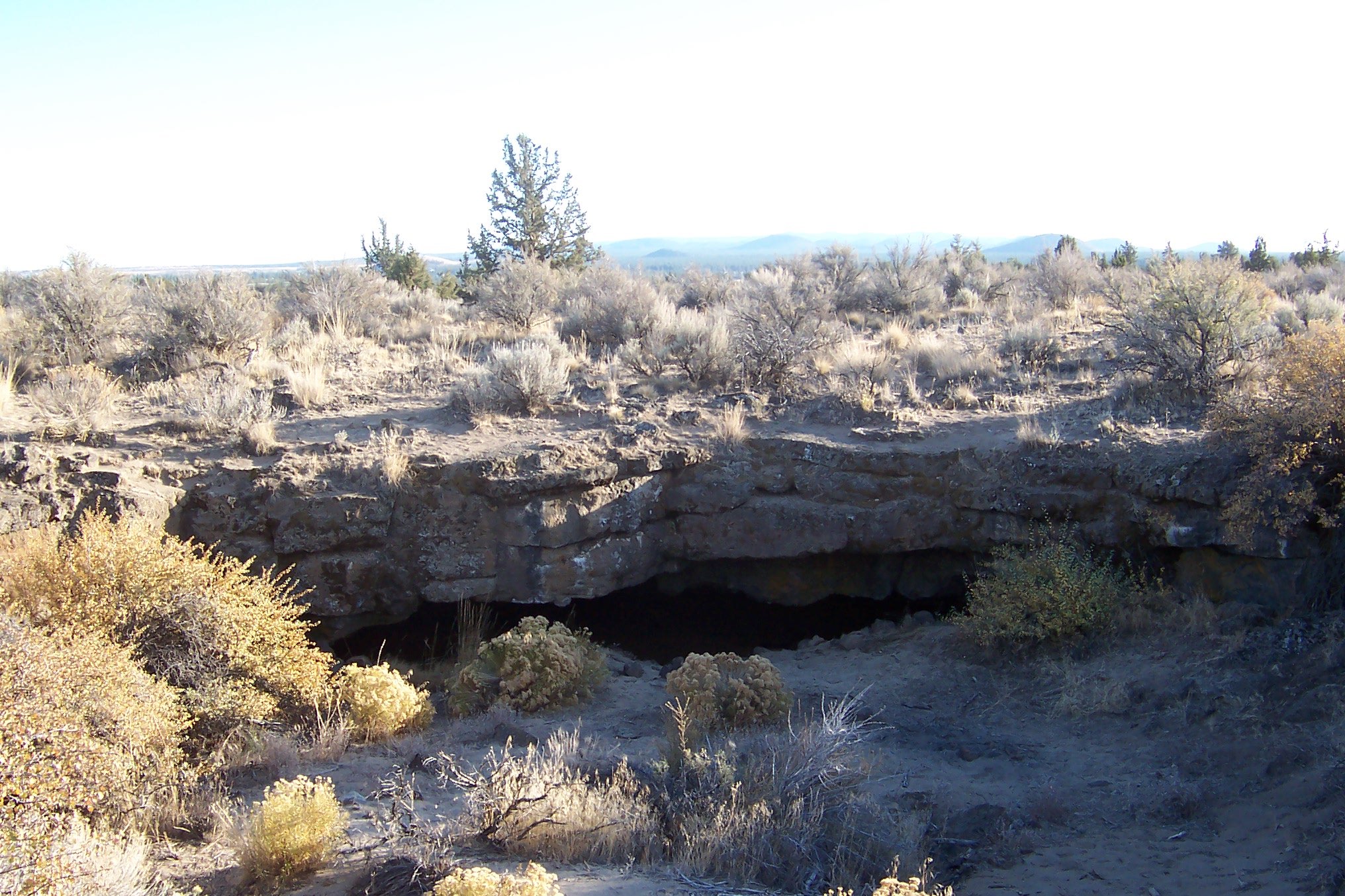
- Vulture Cave of the Horse Lava Tube System
- Interactive map of Horse Lava Tube System
- Location: Deschutes County, Oregon, United States
- Geology: Horse Cave lobe; basalt of Lava Top Butte
- Difficulty: Easy to Moderate
- Access: Varied
- Cave survey: Ongoing

The Horse Lava Tube System (or Horse system) is a series of lava tubes within Deschutes County, Oregon, of the United States. The system starts within the Deschutes National Forest on the northern flank of Newberry Volcano and heads north into and near the city of Bend. The system continues north to Redmond and includes the Redmond Caves. The flow diverts into the Redmond Dry Canyon, where the last known segment is known to exist; however, the basalt flow that created the system goes beyond to Crooked River Ranch and terminates just short of the Crooked River Gorge. The lava flow that created the Horse system is also referred to as the Horse Cave lobe and it filled the ancient channel of the Deschutes River which at that time flowed around the east side of Pilot Butte. The Horse Cave lobe is a part of the basalt of Lava Top Butte which also consists of the Arnold Lava Tube System, the Badlands rootless shield, and the Lava Top butte basalt. All have a geologic age around 80,000 years old.

== History ==
The system got its name from Ronald Greeley of NASA who named it during his study of lava tubes for the Oregon Department of Geology and Mineral Industries. He based it on the first well known cave in the system: Horse Cave. Horse Cave was discovered in the early 1900s by a group of cowboys who, while tracking down some of their lost cattle, found the cave. In the process, the cowboys spooked a few horses who were taking shelter just inside the cave entrance. However, the first known caves in the area may have actually been the Redmond Caves. During the 1870s an old stage road passed by their area. Undoubtedly, though, many of the caves in the system were already known to prehistoric Native Americans, as attributed by archeological artifacts found within.

In modern times, the caves of the system have been affected in different ways. Some caves are privately held, while others are under the jurisdiction of the city of Bend. The city of Bend holds 7 caves on their property, one of which was the Oregon Moonbase. The Oregon Moonbase was a lunar base analogue site and took place in Youngs Cave circa 1990. The Department of State Lands holds 8 caves within their jurisdiction. In Redmond, the Bureau of Land Management, in conjunction with the city of Redmond, manages 5 caves. The Deschutes National Forest holds the spatter cone caves. With so many land owners, the caves see different impacts. Some examples would be: some have been filled in and paved over, a couple have been incorporated into parts of private homes, still others are seeing increased amounts of vandalism and defacement.

== Conservation ==
The major threat to the caves of the Horse system is development. The expanding city of Bend threatens their existence as the city's Urban Growth Boundary envelops the caves. Once in the hands of private developers, the caves' continued presence cannot be guaranteed.

In an effort to work with private owners and state regulators, the Oregon High Desert Grotto has worked to help ensure their survival. In 1995, the Grotto participated in a cave restoration project of the Horse Caves. They removed garbage from the caves only to learn that two years later an equal amount of garbage had been redeposited back into the caves. In 1997 the Grotto did two additional cleanups in conjunction with Z21 News, Off the Map Caving Society, Youth Challenge Program of the Oregon National Guard, students from Bend and Mountain View high schools, and the owner of the cave. The collaboration was able to achieve the removal of garbage and the scrubbing of graffiti from the walls.

Recently, in 2006 to 2007 members of the Grotto worked in conjunction with the Department of State Lands. The Grotto surveyed and drafted maps of the 8 caves on the State's land. They also consulted in the management of the caves as well as the bats known to use the sites. In 2008, the Grotto received a participation award from State leaders for their volunteer work with the state.

== Caves of the Horse Lava Tube System ==
There are 122 known caves in the system, varying from the very small spatter cone and rootless vent caves (59), to the very large and multi-lateral lava tubes (63). Length of the total traversable passage within the system is in excess of 22,000 feet. Generally, only a few caves within the system are known to the public because the majority lie on private property. Over time, the popularity of the caves wax and wane, but a few seem to always remain in the local press. These include: The Horse Caves, The Redmond Caves, Stevens Cave, Lewis Farm Cave no. 1, and Youngs Cave.

=== Spatter Cone Caves ===
The spatter cone caves are located at the vent for the Horse system. Characterized by small and short surface tubes or blister cavities. Most of the spatter cone caves are within a foot or two of the surface, and lie in or adjacent to the spatter cones of the vent area. There are roughly 40 of these small spatter cone caves in the vent area.

=== Rootless Vent Caves ===
A small collection of caves similar to the spatter cone caves are located just north of the spatter cone area. They are called rootless vent caves because they are not sitting directly on the vent such as the spatter cone caves are. Their morphology is otherwise identical to the spatter cone caves. The rootless vent caves are also separated from the spatter cone caves by a younger lava flow associated with Klawhop Butte. There are about 19 rootless vent caves in the Horse system.

=== Lava Tube Caves ===
The major caves of the Horse system are lava tubes. About 63 lava tubes are presently known. Some are really short at about 20 feet in length, while the longest has three paralleling passages and totals almost 4,000 feet in length. More probably exist as some may not have natural entrances, and some may have had entrances that have been filled in over the last 100 years.

=== Miscellaneous Caves ===
A few other caves exist in the system. These are mostly surface tubes, though a couple are shelters or talus caves.

== See also ==
- Redmond Caves
- Arnold Lava Tube System
- Oregon High Desert Grotto
