= Pressure ridge =

A pressure ridge may refer to:

- Pressure ridge (ice), between ice floes
- Pressure ridge (lava), in a lava flow
- Pressure ridge (seismic), in a fault zone

== See also ==
- Ridge (meteorology), an elongated area of relatively high atmospheric pressure
