= Wilson Butte Cave =

- U.S. National Register of Historic Places
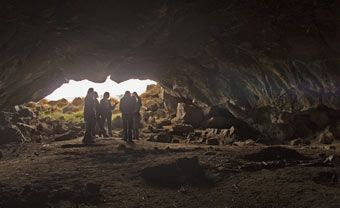
- Wilson Butte Cave appears in a tumulus

- Location within Idaho Location within the United States
- Interactive map showing the location of Wilson Butte Cave
- Nearest city: Hunt, Idaho in Jerome County
- Coordinates: 42°47′06″N 114°12′51″W
- NRHP reference No.: 74000741
- Added to NRHP: November 21, 1974

Wilson Butte Cave is located on the Snake River plain in Jerome County, northeast of Twin Falls and southeast of Shoshone, Idaho. It is an archeological site listed on the National Register of Historic Places and maintained by the Bureau of Land Management (BLM).

A round bubble in appearance, it pops up from a flat, wide bed of ancient basalt lava. An inflationary or uplift cave is inside the bubble. While archeologists are uncertain of the exact dates prior to 10,000 years ago, evidence has been found that native peoples lived at Wilson Butte Cave at least 10,000 years ago. Artifacts found here provide the oldest evidence of human presence on the Snake River Plain and are among the oldest evidence in North America. Archeologists are fairly certain that the cave was settled so early because it was used as a base to hunt bison. Strong connections have been found between the Fremont culture and the Shoshone people, who lived there after the Fremont peoples. Vegetation in the region was very similar to modern times. Camels and giant ground sloths once roamed this region. Deposits here are believed to have been undisturbed until amateurs discovered them in 1958. Two of the major excavations of the cave were conducted by teams led by Ruth Gruhn: one in 1959–1960 and one in 1988–1989. Gruhn dates the site's earliest occupation to 14,000–15,000 years ago.

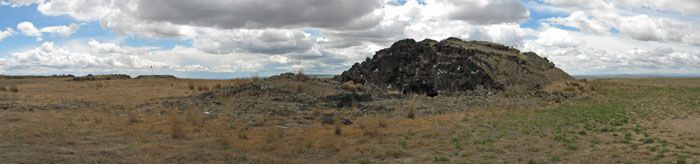
Wilson Butte Cave protrudes like a rocky bubble on a vast, level sea of ancient lava

The lava of the area is a dark gray to black fine-grained basalt. The cave is a lava tube developed in a pressure ridge in the flowing lava. The source of the lava is Wilson's Butte, which is about one half mile southeast of the cave. The lava is more than 15,000 years old, as determined by radiocarbon dating of a camel bone from within a lava tube cave. The bone had tool markings indicating working by humans.

== See also ==
- National Register of Historic Places listings in Jerome County, Idaho
