= Oregon Desert Trail =

American network of trails across Oregon High Desert

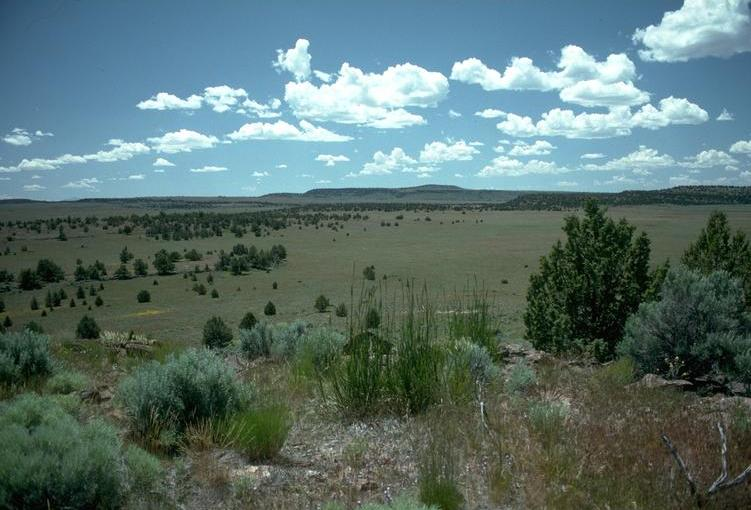
Oregon High Desert near Frenchglen, about four miles north of the trail

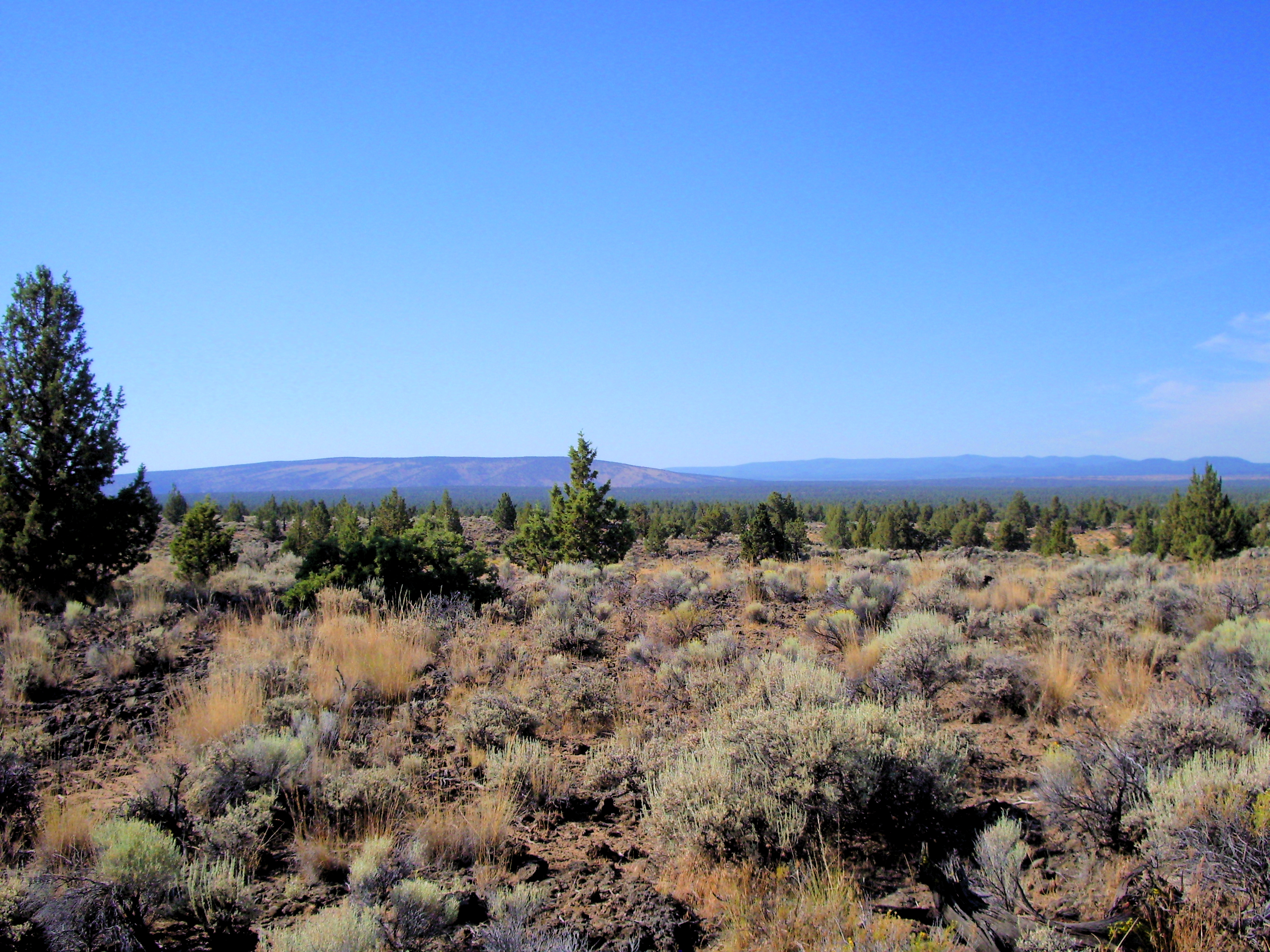
Oregon Badlands near the west end of the trail with a mixture of sage, pine, tumulus, and ash-like soil

The Oregon Desert Trail is a network of trails, cross country travel and two-track dirt roads across the Oregon High Desert. The trail is approximately 750 miles long, with termini located near Bend, Oregon, and near the Idaho border at Lake Owyhee State Park.

The route is on existing trails and across tracts of public land—mostly Bureau of Land Management, much of it wilderness study area. The west end of the trail is on the northern border of Oregon Badlands Wilderness and heads south. It meanders widely to take in public land throughout southeastern Oregon: Diablo Peak, Fremont National Forest, Hart Mountain National Antelope Refuge, Steens Mountain, the Pueblo Mountains, the Trout Creek Mountains, and the Owyhee River Wilderness. It passes through the tiny cities of Christmas Valley, Paisley, Plush, Frenchglen, Fields, McDermitt, Rome, and Adrian. The trail runs South East from Central Oregon, towards Lakeview. It touches on the Oregon-Nevada border at Denio, Nevada and again at McDermitt, Nevada. The route zigzags eastward to within 15 miles (24 km) of the southeastern state corner while following the West Little Owyhee River downstream and then turns northward as it merges to form the Owyhee River. The trail's ends are west-northwest to east-southeast (96° true) of each other by 195 miles (314 km). The route was developed by the Oregon Natural Desert Association (ONDA).

The Oregon Desert Trail is set apart from other similar trails, such as the Pacific Crest Trail, in that it: offers more solitude - there is little to no traffic on the route, one must rely on their own navigational skills - there is no dedicated signage, and it is a very dry trail with extended water carries and water caches necessary. This trail is not recommended for beginners, as it is difficult and requires extensive planning, has limited access to water, limited resupply locations, and requires hikers to rely on their navigational skills.

Bikes are allowed on parts of the trail, but are not practical in some areas and are not allowed in wilderness areas. Sections can be paddled, explored on skis, horseback, or biked.

== History ==
The Oregon Desert Trail was envisioned by the nonprofit organization, Oregon Natural Desert Association (ONDA), as a way for people to connect to the landscape. The first thru-hike was made in the summer of 2013 by 33-year-old Bend resident Sage Clegg and took just under six weeks. During her hike Clegg reported trail conditions to ONDA, and gathered information to help make the route traversable for other trail users.

== Route ==
The ODT is divided into four geographical regions as defined by ONDA's ODT guide: Central Oregon Volcanic (101 miles), West Basin and Range (269 miles), East Basin and Range (163 miles), and Owyhee Canyonlands (213 miles), and is marked with GPS waypoints. There are two termini of the trail; the west terminus in the Badlands, and the East terminus in the Owyhee Canyonlands, in Lake Owyhee State Park. The trail can be hiked in either direction. It passes through few towns that include: Paisley, Plush, French Glen, Fields, and Rome.

Point	Location
Oregon Badlands	44.04554°N 121.03805°W
Fort Rock	43.35667°N 121.05278°W
Christmas Valley	43.23625°N 120.63693°W
Paisley	42.69376°N 120.54608°W
Plush	42.41153°N 119.90316°W
Frenchglen	42.82797°N 118.91522°W
Fields	42.26434°N 118.67518°W
Denio	41.98990°N 118.63434°W
McDermitt	41.99730°N 117.71900°W
Rome	42.84641°N 117.63580°W
Adrian	43.74072°N 117.07183°W
Lake Owyhee State Park	43.6277°N 117.2327°W
