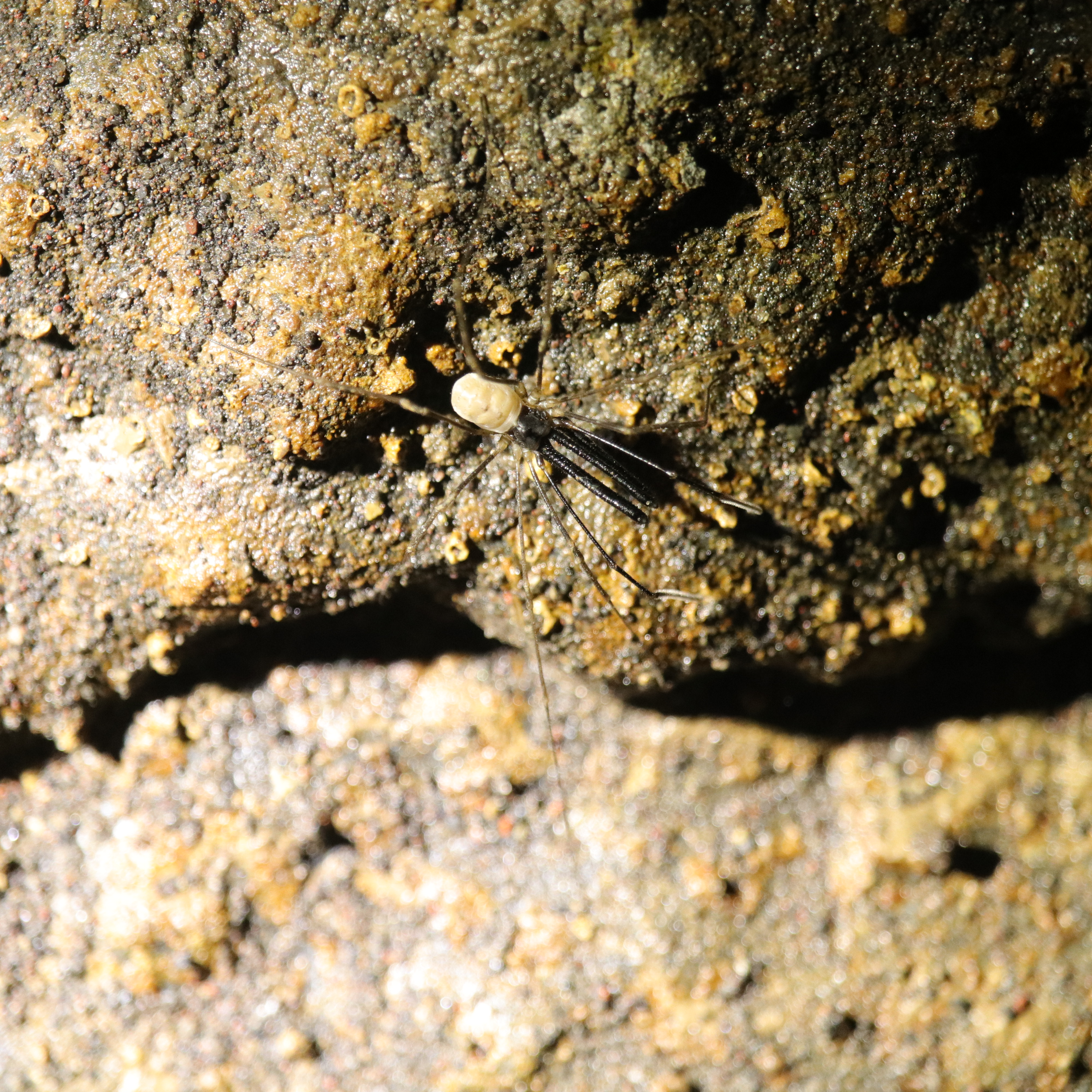
- An adult T. marchingtoni clinging to a wall inside Lava River Cave.

Scientific classification
- Kingdom: Animalia
- Phylum: Arthropoda
- Subphylum: Chelicerata
- Class: Arachnida
- Order: Opiliones
- Family: Taracidae
- Genus: Taracus
- Species: T. marchingtoni

Binomial name
- Taracus marchingtoni Shear, 2016

= Taracus marchingtoni =

Genus of arachnid

Taracus marchingtoni is a genus of harvestman found in the lava caves of semi-arid and arid regions of central Oregon. It belongs to the family Taracidae and was first collected by Jean and Wilton Ivie in 1965 in Lava River Cave but not identified as a new species until collected by Neil Marchington of the Oregon High Desert Grotto in 2008. Its range is suspected to be the surrounding areas of Newberry Volcano. It has enlarged but thin chelicerae, typically equal to or longer than the entire length of the body, and in small-bodied males nearly three times as long. The harvestman is troglobiotic and has a predominantly white abdomen, black chelicerae, and highly reduced eye size. T. marchingtoni has been observed feeding on small troglophilic millipedes identified as Plumatyla humerosa of the Conotylidae family.

== See also ==
- Trogloraptor - a cave-dwelling spider of southern Oregon
