= George Millican =

George Millican may refer to:

- George Millican, namesake of Millican, Oregon
- George Millican, character in Humans (TV series)
