= Walterville, Oregon =

Unincorporated community in the state of Oregon, United States

- Unincorporated community
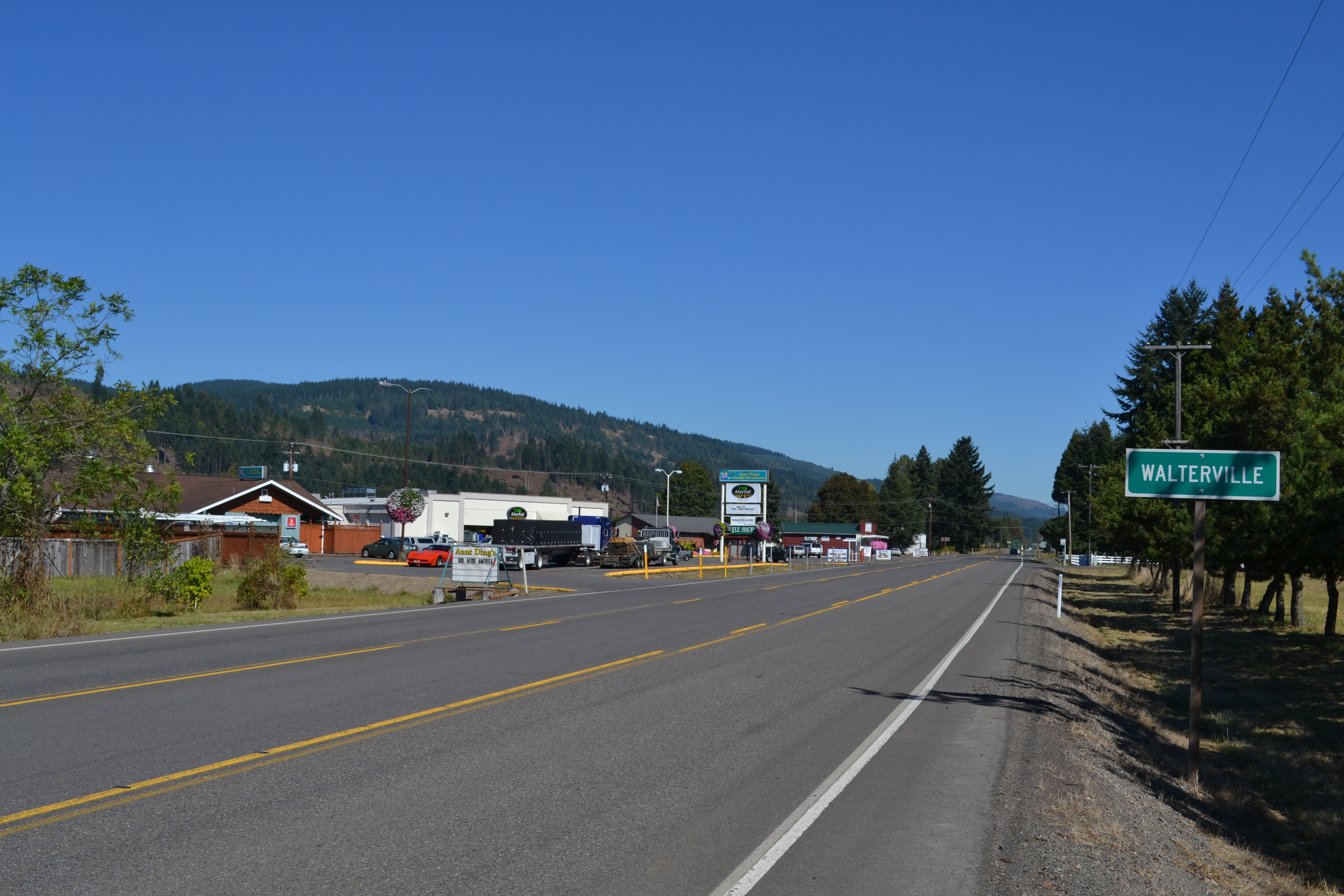
- Walterville on Oregon Route 126

- Location within Oregon Location within the United States
- Coordinates: 44°04′07″N 122°48′14″W
- Country: United States
- State: Oregon
- County: Lane
- Elevation: 607 ft (185 m)
- Time zone: UTC-8 (Pacific (PST))
  - Summer (DST): UTC-7 (PDT)
- ZIP code: 97489
- Area codes: 458 and 541
- GNIS feature ID: 1128620

Walterville is an unincorporated community in Lane County, Oregon, United States. It is located six miles (9.7 km) east of Springfield on Oregon Route 126 near the McKenzie River.

Walterville post office was established in 1875 and named by the first postmaster and prominent Central Oregon rancher, George Millican, for his son Walter. The town of Millican in Deschutes County was named for George Millican. Members of the Millican family have lived in the area since the 1860s and the Millican Century Farm is still in operation.

Walterville Pond, on Eugene Water & Electric Board's (EWEB) Walterville Canal, is a 70-acre (280,000 m^{2}) water storage pond that is also used for fishing and birdwatching. Walterville Canal was built by EWEB in 1911 to provide hydropower to pump McKenzie River water to Eugene for use as drinking water.

Walterville Elementary School is part of the Springfield School District.

== Climate ==
This region experiences warm (but not hot) and dry summers, with no average monthly temperatures above 71.6 °F. According to the Köppen Climate Classification system, Walterville has a warm-summer Mediterranean climate, abbreviated "Csb" on climate maps.
