= Sandy Glacier Caves =

Glacier caves in Oregon, United States

Coordinates: 45.385°N 121.718°W

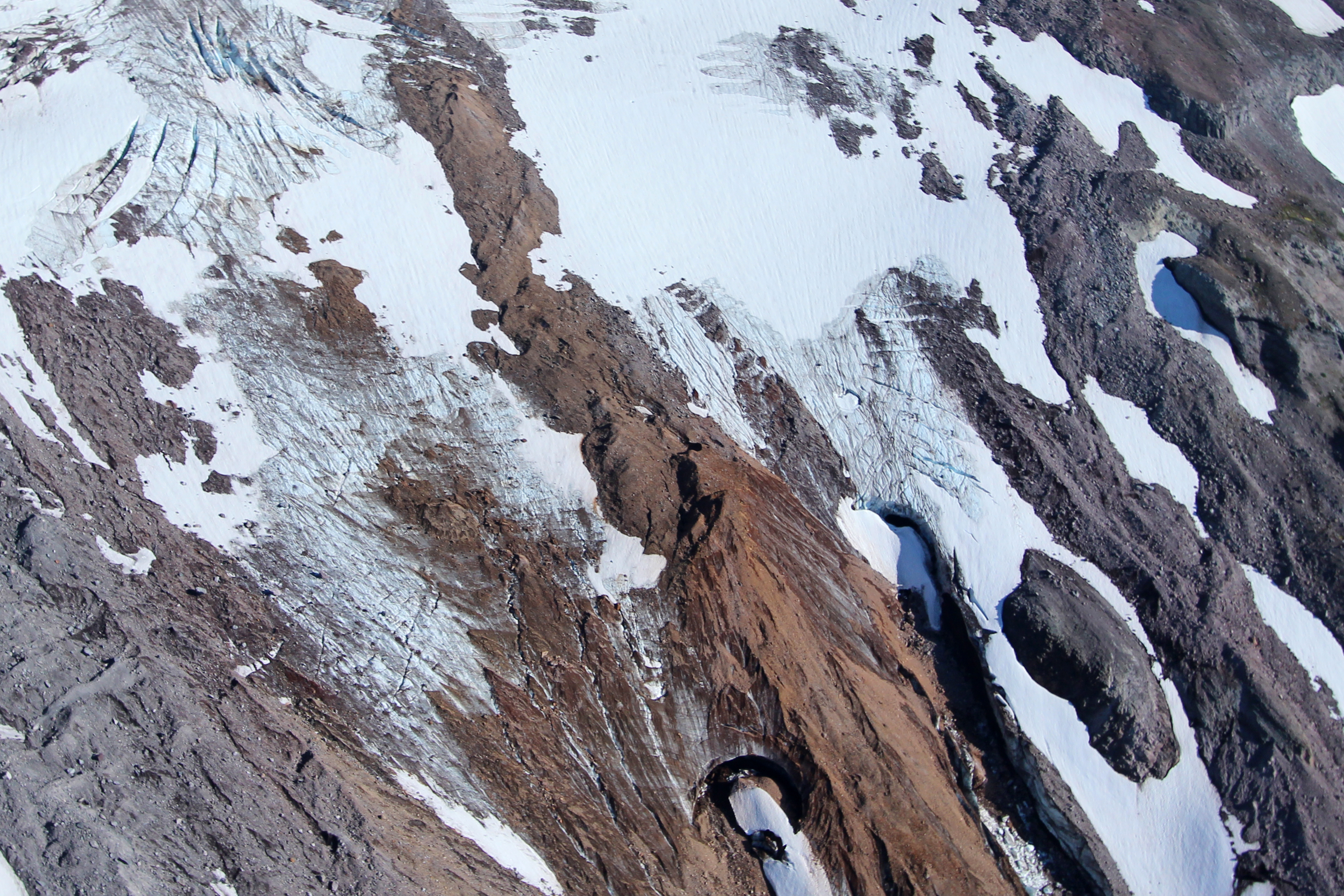
- An aerial view of the collapsed "Snow Dragon" and the nearby "Pure Imagination" ice caves taken August 29, 2016.
- Interactive map of Sandy Glacier Caves
- Location: Clackamas County, Oregon, U.S.
- Length: >1 mile
- Geology: cavern in glacial ice
- Difficulty: Difficult
- Hazards: Exposure, hypothermia, structure collapse
- Access: Public

The Sandy Glacier Caves are a system of glacier caves within the ice of Sandy Glacier on Mount Hood, Oregon. They are thought to be the largest glacier caves in the lower 48 states of the United States. Surveys done in 2011 and 2012 have measured the system at over 1 mile in length or about 7,000 feet. The caves formed from internal glacial melting at what are the headwaters of the Muddy Fork river. As melting continues, the caves grow larger with their entrances melting their way up the glacier's slope. Eventually it is predicted the caves will be completely gone within 7 to 10 years once the interior melting has reached the surface of the glacier.

During early summer, all three surveyed caves within the glacier are connected through perennial ice and are called the Snow Dragon Glacier Cave System. By late summer, the perennial ice melts away leaving only the disconnected glacier caves that have been individually named Snow Dragon, Pure Imagination, and Frozen Minotaur Caves. In 2013, a fourth glacier cave was discovered on the Sandy Glacier, but so far it has not been explored.

== Exploration ==
The caves were first brought to the attention of Brent McGregor and Eddy Cartaya, both members of the Oregon High Desert Grotto, when a video was posted on YouTube showing individuals at the entrance to a new glacier cave. Being ill-equipped, no exploration was done until McGregor and Cartaya explored the cave shortly thereafter with Scott Linn, and then returning to survey the cave which they coined Snow Dragon. Return trips led to the discovery of Pure Imagination Cave and then Frozen Minotaur. In 2012, the Oregon High Desert Grotto and other NSS members surveyed the entire system. In 2013, after numerous trips to the cave, OPB's Oregon Field Guide lead their most complex shoot to document the caves being studied by the grotto and scientists. As of October 2013, McGregor and Cartaya spent more than 300 hours mapping more than a mile of caves within the glacier. In 2016 it was reported that since 2014, McGregor's team the Glacier Cave Explorers has completed three expeditions to the glacier to map, photograph, and record environmental data. Their work in the caves discovered fir tree seedlings, duck feathers, and extremophiles. The team has brought glaciologists with them including Andrew Fountain, Jason Gulley and Gunnar Johnson.

== History and science ==
The Sandy Glacier has lost about 40%, or almost half, of its ice between 1907 and 2004. The expeditions led by Cartaya and McGregor included Andrew Fountain to determine how much ice the glacier was losing per year by placing stakes on the surface. Internal temperatures in Snow Dragon Cave were measured at above 40 degrees Fahrenheit. Andrew Fountain believed the melting of the glacier is a sign that it was dying and in 5 to 10 years the caves would be entirely gone. In 2015 it was observed that a major portion of Snow Dragon had collapsed. The collapse of the caves continued with the majority of the caves being reported as entirely gone in 2016. The initial reason for their demise was reported as climate change, however other factors seemed to be contributing such as geothermal activity.
