= Horse Ridge =

Series of volcanic ridges in Deschutes County, Oregon, United States

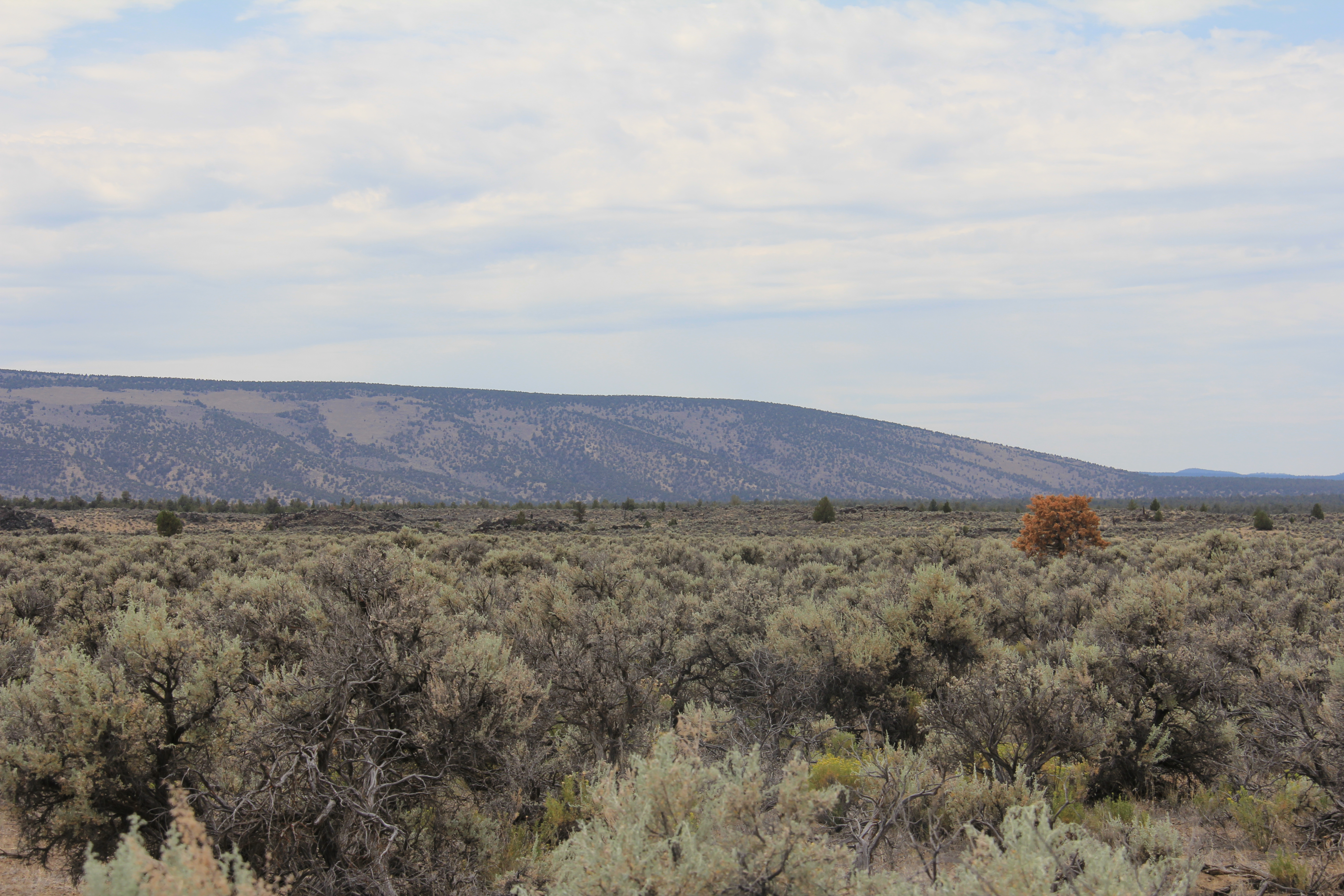
- Horse Ridge seen behind the Oregon Badlands Wilderness

Geography
- Location: Deschutes County, Oregon, U.S.
- Range coordinates: 43.910°N 121.066°W

Geology
- Volcanic arc: Yellowstone Hotspot, Ochoco Mountains

Horse Ridge is series of volcanic ridges in eastern Deschutes County, Oregon, United States. It is located south of Highway 20, west of the Millican community, and south of the Oregon Badlands Wilderness. The Horse Ridge Research Natural Area occupies predominantly north and northeast facing slopes of the ridges. It was established in 1967. The Brothers Fault Zone bisects the ridges and exposed mafic lava rock has been dated to 7.5 ma.

Horse Ridge is a winter mountain biking recreation area with about 30 miles (48 km) of trails.
