= Redmond Caves =

Cave system in Oregon, U.S.

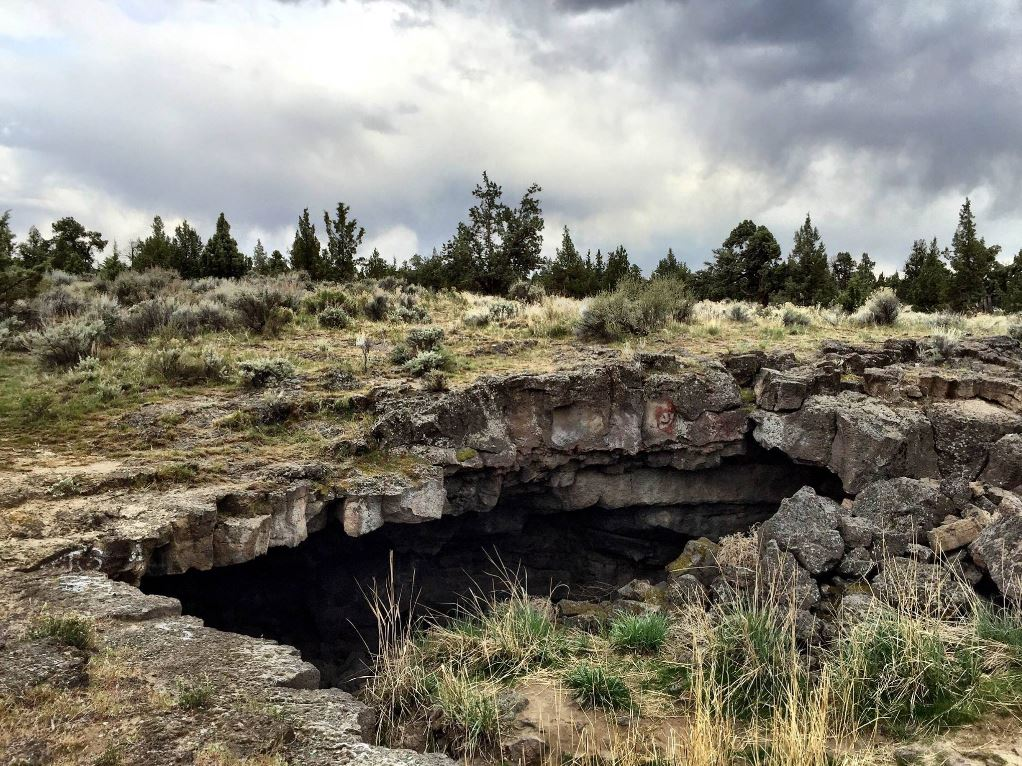
- Entrance to Redmond Cave no. 1
- Interactive map of Redmond Caves
- Location: Deschutes County, Oregon, U.S.
- Coordinates: 44.24741373026158°N 121.17770003398299°W
- Geology: Horse Cave lobe; basalt of Lava Top Butte
- Entrances: 6
- Entrances list: Each cave has one entrance, except Cave Next Door has two
- Difficulty: Easy to Moderate
- Access: Public
- Cave survey: 1997-06-07; 1980-11-??; 1969-03-28

The Redmond Caves are a group of six lava tubes in Deschutes County, Oregon, United States. The caves are located in the city of Redmond and are jointly managed by the city and the Bureau of Land Management (BLM). Five of the caves are in the Redmond Caves Park and have been known locally for over 100 years. The caves are part of the Horse Lava Tube System and the farthest northern extent of the system. The lava flow that created both the Horse system and the Redmond Caves continued into the Redmond Dry Canyon and terminated near Crooked River Ranch. The caves have a geologic age of about 80,000 years.

== History ==
Many of the caves in the system were known by prehistoric Native Americans, indicated by archaeological artifacts found therein. The first known caves of Central Oregon by Euro-Americans, may have been the Redmond Caves. During the 1870s an old stage road passed by their area.

Since their discovery by settlers, various uses for the caves have been recommended. One report mentions they were considered for potato storage as early as the 1910s. There was also a proposal from a Madras resident who wanted to use them for growing mushrooms. On one occasion, the Deschutes Historical Society was notified about using the site as their museum.

In 1954, the Lions Club of Redmond opened up an entrance to a previously inaccessible cave. After finally gaining entry into the cave, they discovered footprints of modern shoes in the dusty floor. Later, two boys admitted to squeezing into the cave the night before. The newly opened cave turned out to be the longest on site and Y-shaped. Later, the cave was fully explored by two boys searching for relics. They discovered the Y-shaped passage was instead a loop.

After the discovery of the new cave, John Berning of the Lions Club showed a few artifacts to Dick Nooe and Harry Sly (then small boys). The artifacts had come from within the caves. Later, the boys would go back several times to sift through the dirt and pumice and found a wide assortment of ancient artifacts. After the boys were notified they were violating the Preservation of American Antiquities Act, they donated their collections to the University of Oregon.

During the 1960s, the caves were considered as fallout shelters by the Office of Civil Defense. The three largest caves were reviewed and noted to have a capacity up to 450 individuals. In the early 1970s, packets were mailed to residents of Bend and Redmond showing directions on how to get to their nearest fallout shelter. The caves were to be used in the event of an atomic attack, volcanic eruption, or earthquake.

Since the 1970s, the caves were constantly being proposed as a city park site. After 2005, the caves saw significant progress for incorporation into a park. Before improving the site, archaeological field studies examined the caves and their contents. In the meantime, the caves have suffered from recurring vandalism and defacement.

== Conservation ==
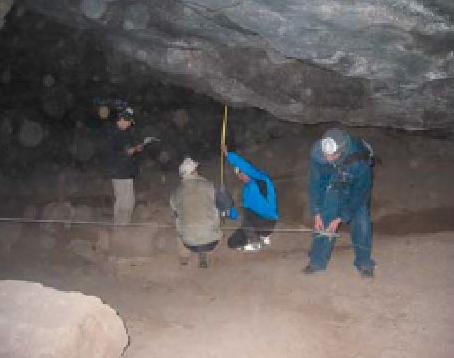
University of Oregon students mapping the caves

The caves have been the center of cleanups over the years. After repeated vandalism and defacement of the caves, projects were created to help maintain them. In 1997, the Oregon High Desert Grotto participated in the survey and mapping of all five caves on the site. By 2002, the BLM held a cleanup event at the Redmond Caves. Together they extracted 300 tires in addition to a car at the park site. In 2006 the BLM organized another cleanup. It took place on National Public Lands Day and received help from the Oregon High Desert Grotto and the Willamette Valley Grotto. They removed graffiti and trash, in addition to other projects.

Bat usage of the caves has been documented at various times. It has been suggested that prior to frequent human use, the caves held many bats. On a visit in early 1986 by Mark Perkins, a bat biologist, however, he reported seeing only one hibernating big-eared bat. During a summer search, Perkins again noted only one big-eared bat using the caves as a night roost. During the same survey, Perkins also documented the usage of the caves by two bats previously unknown to have used the caves. They were the big brown bat and the Western Small-footed Myotis; all were male bats. The BLM drafted a Record of Decision on management of various resources. Among the considerations was the restoration of suitable bat habitat in a portion of the Redmond Caves.

== The caves ==
The park currently holds five caves; in the past, however, more caves around the site were known.

A very small cave is located on the adjacent airport property. Airport Cave is a very small cave only 12 feet in length.

One cave was known to exist at the site of a former lumber mill nearby. Dick Nooe recalled tunneling westward whereupon he heard a thundering sound overhead. It turned out to be a train on the surface. This cave is known as Redmond Railroad Cave and was closed up years later by the lumber mill. It is located on the property of Brad's Auto Parts.

On a similar note, a cave west of the Redmond Railroad Cave was accidentally breached. This cave had no known natural entrance prior to the breach. It was opened up during the construction of a parking lot. It was estimated to be 100 feet long and headed westward and the floor was covered in gypsum deposits. The cave was closed back up during the construction. The cave was originally discovered when a bank resided on the property, but today it is a Dairy Queen.

Lions Cave was opened up by the Redmond Lions Club in 1954 and named after them by an editor of The Redmond Spokesman.

A lava tube was detected at the north end of the Redmond Canyon during an expansion of the water treatment plant. Before installing a new clarifier, seismic refraction detected a cavity between 40 and 50 feet below the surface. It would make it the northernmost lava tube known in the Horse Lava Tube System to date.

The six existing caves have two sets of names. Numbers have been designated by the BLM, and those previously without names, were coined by the caving clubs of Oregon or the local newspaper.

- Airport Cave (Redmond Cave no. 6)
- Lions Cave (Redmond Cave no. 4)
- Insignificant Redmond Cave (Redmond Cave no. 5)
- Cave Next Door (Redmond Cave no. 3)
- Redmond Cave (Redmond Cave no. 1)
- No Account Redmond Cave (Redmond Cave no. 2)

Buried caves include:

- Redmond Railroad Cave
- Bank Cave

== See also ==
- Horse Lava Tube System
- Oregon High Desert Grotto
