= Oregon Badlands Wilderness =

Wilderness area in Oregon, United States

- IUCN category Ib (wilderness area)
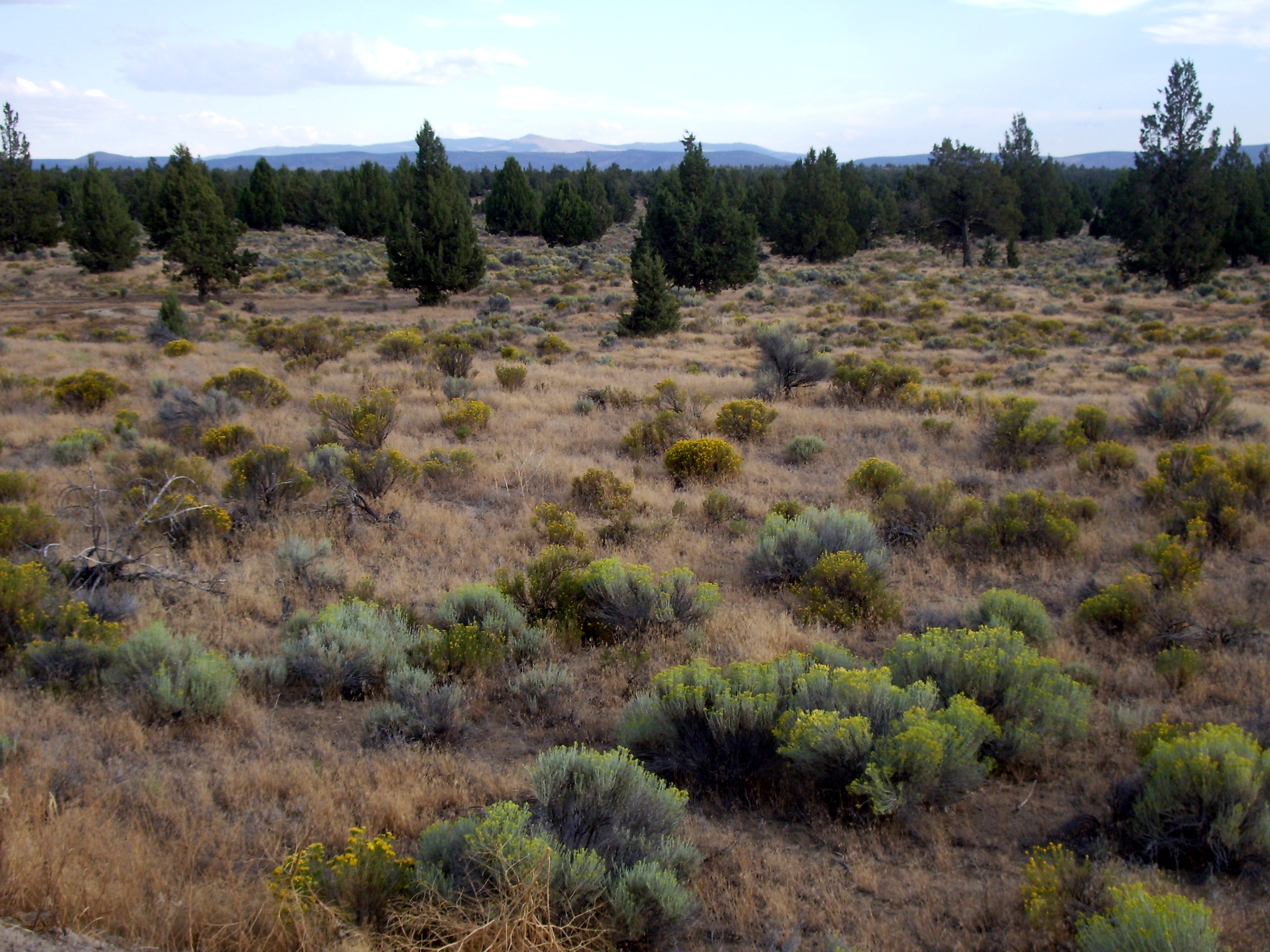
- Oregon Badlands with sagebrush in bloom, Juniper trees, and proximity to Oregon Cascades

- Location within the United States
- Location: Deschutes / Crook counties, Oregon, United States
- Nearest city: Bend, Oregon
- Coordinates: 44°00′N 121°02′W
- Area: 29,301 acres (11,858 ha)
- Established: United States Bureau of Land Management

The Oregon Badlands Wilderness is a 29,301-acre (11,858 ha) wilderness area located east of Bend in Deschutes and Crook counties in the U.S. state of Oregon. The wilderness is managed by the Bureau of Land Management as part of the National Landscape Conservation System and was created by the Omnibus Public Land Management Act of 2009, which was signed into law by President Barack Obama on 30 March 2009.

The area is known for igneous castle-like rock formations, harsh terrain, ancient Juniper trees, sagebrush, and extensive arid land. Desert wildflowers, dry river canyons, and Native American pictographs can be found. The blind iditarod racer Rachel Scdoris trained in the area, and the wilderness is home to the western terminus of the Oregon Desert Trail.

== Geology ==
The wilderness is situated on high desert terrain and is associated with a volcanic rootless shield. This broad 10-to-12-kilometre (6.2 to 7.5 mi) volcanic shield issued lava from a rootless vent. The lava flow dates to about 80,000 years old and comes from a main vent further up the slopes of Newberry Volcano. This main vent was located near Lava Top Butte and the lava that came out of this vent travelled through the Arnold Lava Tube System to arrive at the current location of the Badlands. An irregularly-shaped pit crater at the top of the shield marks the site where lava flowed in all directions to create the Badlands. Lava tubes acted as conduits for the lava in some instances and are evidenced on the surface by tumuli, also known as pressure ridges. Soils in the Badlands were largely formed from ash associated with the eruption of Mount Mazama some 7,700 years ago.

It is the northwesternmost part of the Northern Basin and Range ecoregion, described as Pluvial Lake Basin, and shares many characteristics of the Great Basin.

== Ecology ==
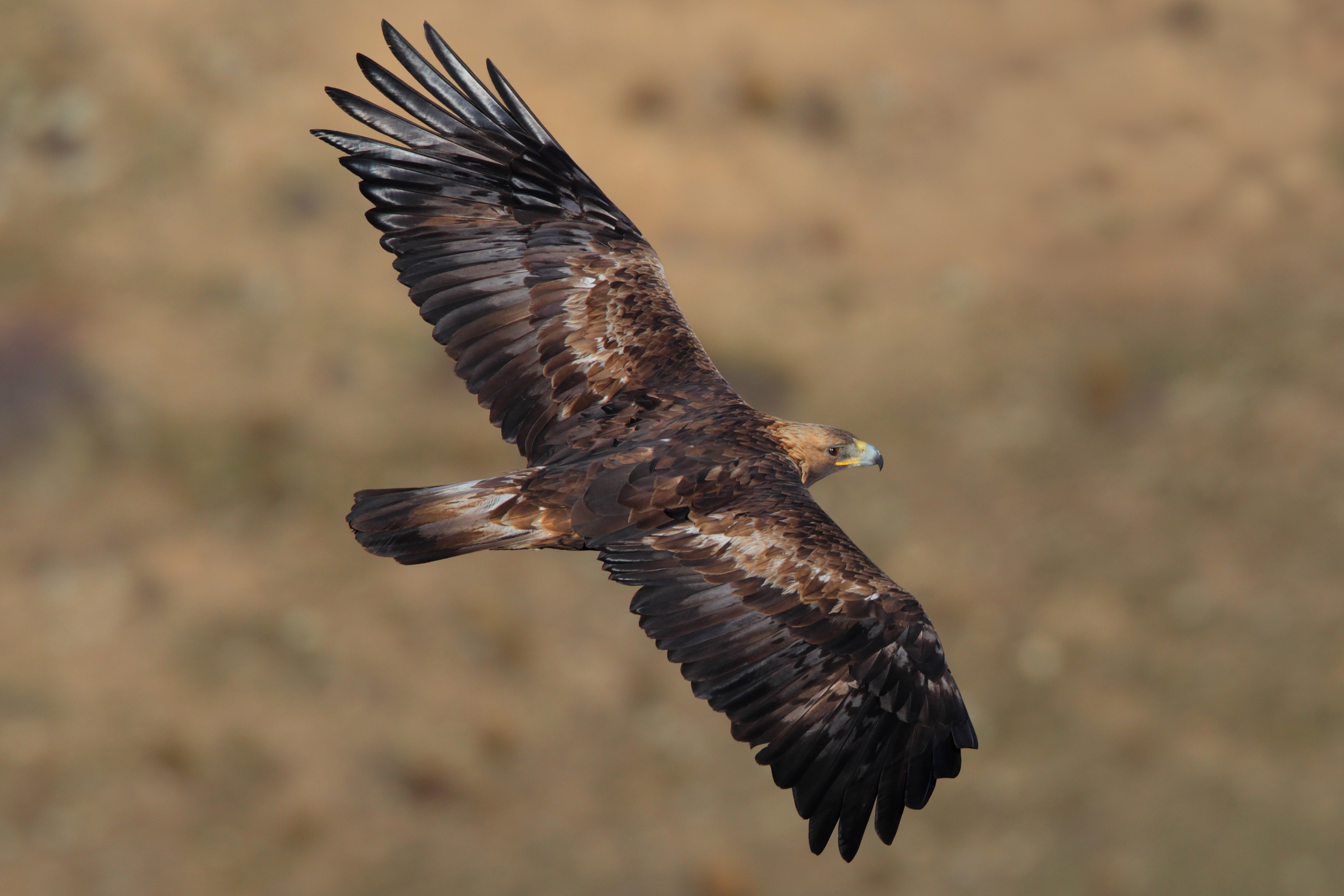
Golden eagle

Native vegetation in the Oregon Badlands Wilderness have adapted to the less than 12 inches (30 cm) of annual rainfall. Western juniper can live to be over 1,000 years old in the region. The oldest dated tree in Oregon – estimated to be over 1,600 years old – grows near the wilderness.

Other common plants found in the Badlands wilderness include big sagebrush, rabbitbrush, and various bunchgrasses, including Idaho fescue and bluebunch wheatgrass. In the spring, the area blooms with a variety of wildflowers, including Oregon sunshine, dwarf monkeyflower, sulfur buckwheat, Indian paintbrush, and mariposa lily.

The wilderness is home to a variety of wildlife, including black-tailed jackrabbit, mule deer, elk, pronghorn, cottontail rabbit, coyote, bats and six species of lizard. More than 100 species of bird live in the area, including golden eagle, sage grouse, and prairie falcon.

== Administration and stewardship ==
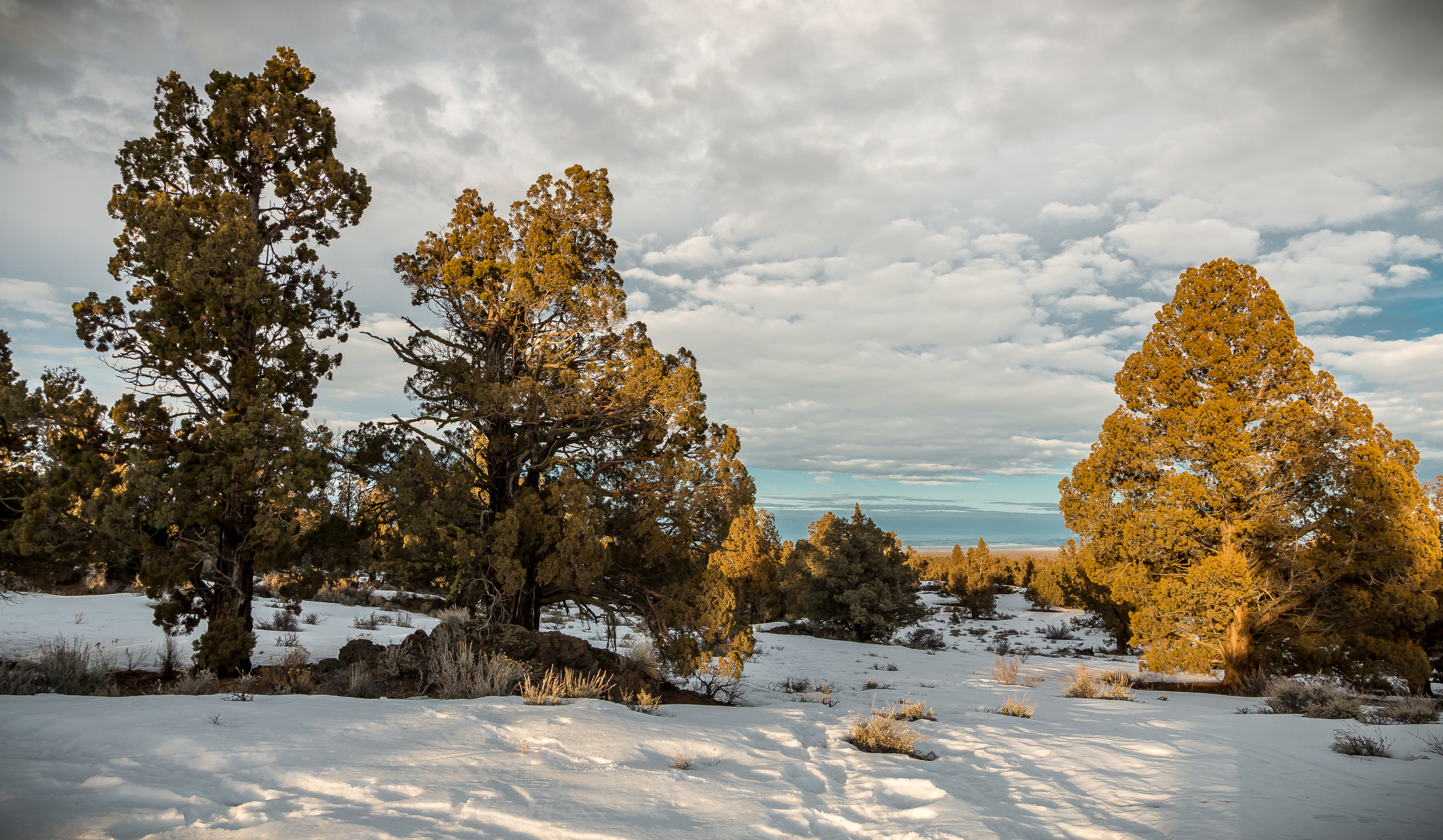
View along the Flatiron Trail, Oregon Badlands Wilderness, January 30, 2017. Photo by Greg Shine, BLM.

The Oregon Badlands Wilderness is administered by the Bureau of Land Management, and is situated within the agency's Prineville District. Before the wilderness designation, the Prineville District's BLM Liaison partnered with outside volunteers to develop physical restoration projects. These volunteers later incorporated as Friends of Oregon Badlands Wilderness after having donated over 1,200 hours of work mapping the area, repairing trailheads, installing kiosks and signs, and removing obsolete fencing that was a hazard to wildlife. As of 2010, Friends of the Oregon Badlands Wilderness had used social media tools to organize over 200 Bend-area residents to execute these projects.

In 2010, the BLM approved the retirement of a grazing permit called the Lynch Allotment, which allowed cattle grazing on a 2,971-acre (1,202 ha) parcel adjoining the wilderness. The parcel is part of a region called the Juniper Woodlands Special Management Area, and contains old-growth juniper home to deer and elk. The Oregon Natural Desert Foundation paid the value of the permit, roughly $10,000, to the compensate the rancher who previously grazed the parcel. The move was supported by adjoining landowners and the unanimous Deschutes County Commission. Because the grazing permit had limited demand and presented significant social and environmental conflicts, the Upper Deschutes Resource Management Plan did not require the BLM to initiate a burdensome retirement process. According to ONDA, conflicts with hikers and equestrians contributed to the ranchers interest in retiring the permit.

The Prineville District of the Bureau of Land Management is currently developing a management plan for the area. The plan is intended to provide guidance for "preserving and enhancing wilderness values while offering opportunities for solitude and primitive recreation, as well as managing other land uses and activities".

== Wilderness designation ==
The BLM designated the Oregon Badlands a wilderness study area in 1980, and proposed federal wilderness designation for the Oregon Badlands in 1989. Although there was popular local support for wilderness status in the years that followed, issues such as grazing rights and off-highway vehicle (OHV) access were subjects of contention.

Wilderness designation was opposed by the Oregon Cattleman's Association and a non-profit group devoted to trail access for OHVs. Among the groups that supported wilderness designation were the Oregon Natural Desert Association (ONDA), the Bend city commissioners, and a rancher named Ray Clarno, who held a grazing permit within the proposed wilderness area. Clarno, alleging that off-road riders cut his fences and left cattle gates open, promised to retire his grazing rights if OHVs were barred from the area. He followed through on this promise in 2005, when the BLM banned OHVs from the Badlands. ONDA estimated the cost of buying out grazing permits from a total of four affected ranchers at about $100,000.

The proposed and final legislation designating the wilderness area included provisions for land swaps between private and public holders. The Central Oregon Irrigation District, which was neutral on the matter of the wilderness itself, supported the proposed legislation because it would benefit from the land swap.

As of 1999, Oregon Senator Ron Wyden supported wilderness designation, and Oregon Senator Gordon H. Smith opposed it. Because the Deschutes County commissioners disagreed about wilderness designation, the Deschutes County Commission ultimately took no official position on the issue. The County Commission received 1,572 comments on the subject, with 75% of them favoring wilderness designation.

Polls of Deschutes County residents conducted in 2002 and 2004 showed an increasing majority support for wilderness designation. In the 2004 poll, 57% of respondents favored the creation of a wilderness area, and 28% were opposed. Wilderness designation was officially granted on 30 March 2009, with the passage of the Omnibus Public Land Management Act of 2009.

== See also ==
- List of Oregon Wildernesses
- List of U.S. Wilderness Areas
