= Lake Owyhee State Park =

State park in Oregon, United States

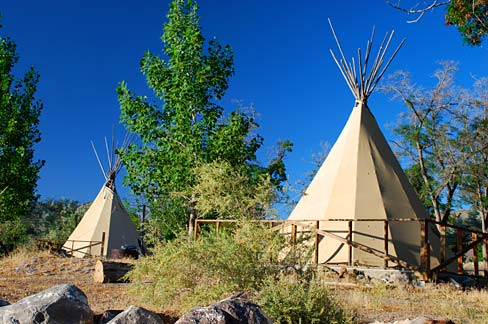
- Teepees at Lake Owyhee State Park

- Location within Oregon Location within the United States
- Type: Public, state
- Location: Malheur County, Oregon
- Nearest city: Caldwell, Idaho
- Coordinates: 43°37′12″N 117°14′15″W
- Operator: Oregon Parks and Recreation Department

Lake Owyhee State Park is a state park in the U.S. state of Oregon, administered by the Oregon Parks and Recreation Department. The park lies on the north-eastern end of the Owhyee reservoir. Bighorn sheep can be found here.

== See also ==
- List of Oregon state parks
