= Millican, Oregon =

Unincorporated community in the state of Oregon, United States

- Unincorporated area
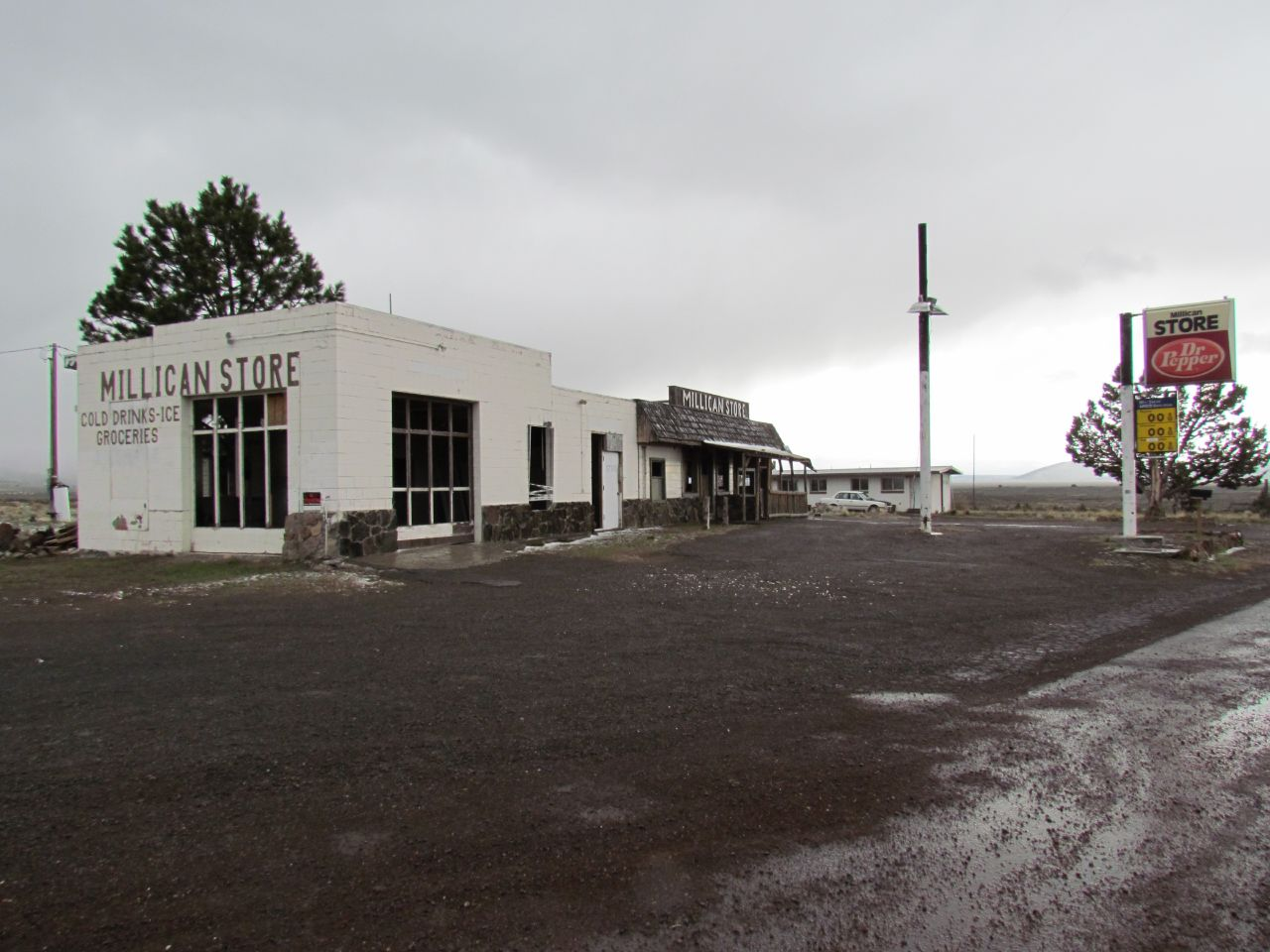
- Millican store and gas station

- Location in Oregon
- Coordinates: 43.879°N 120.920°W
- Country: United States
- State: Oregon
- County: Deschutes

Area
  - Land: 100,000 acres (40,000 ha)
- Elevation: 4,330 ft (1,320 m)

Population (2021)
  - Total: 150
- Time zone: Pacific
- Area code: 97701

Millican is an unincorporated community in Deschutes County, Oregon, United States on U.S. Route 20. It is just east of Horse Ridge and approximately 25 miles (40 km) east of Bend and is part of the Bend, Oregon Metropolitan Statistical Area. Its elevation is 4,304 feet (1,312 m) above sea level. As of February 2021, the population is approximately 150.

== History ==
In the late 1880s, George Millican established a ranch in the area. Millican's wife suggested that the town be named after him, and Millican post office was established in 1913. George Millican sold his ranch in 1916. In the early 20th century Millican's population was 60.

In 1930, U.S. 20 was built north of the community, so Millican was moved to be next to the highway. By this time, the town's population was one—the postmaster, Billy Rahn, who lived there from about 1922 to 1945. When Rahn retired in 1942, the post office was closed.

In 1946, Bill Mellin bought Millican and ran the gas station, store and post office. The post office closed for good in 1953, but the store and gas station remained open for 35 more years. In 1985, Mellin put the community up for sale. In 1988, Mellin was robbed and murdered by a parolee from the Oregon State Penitentiary who worked for him in the store, making the town's population zero. Mellin's wife and two children had died before him, the children in a car accident and a plane crash, and his wife, Helen, of a heart attack. Mellin's granddaughter took over the store for a few years.

Later Eric Cooper bought Mellin's estate. In 1999, Bruce and Tracy Resnick bought Millican with plans to donate the land to the Animal Rescue League, but they put the town up for sale in 2000. The Murray family moved to Millican in 2002, bringing the town's population up to seven. The Murrays rented the townsite and ran the store. The Millican Store closed again in 2005 when the Murrays moved on to run the cafe and gas station in Hampton, Oregon, further east. In February 2009, the 75 acres (300,000 m^{2}) on which Millican is located was for sale by the Resnicks, and had been since August 2008. The townsite and store were purchased in the spring of 2010 and a caretaker now lives on site.

== See also ==
- Walterville, Oregon
