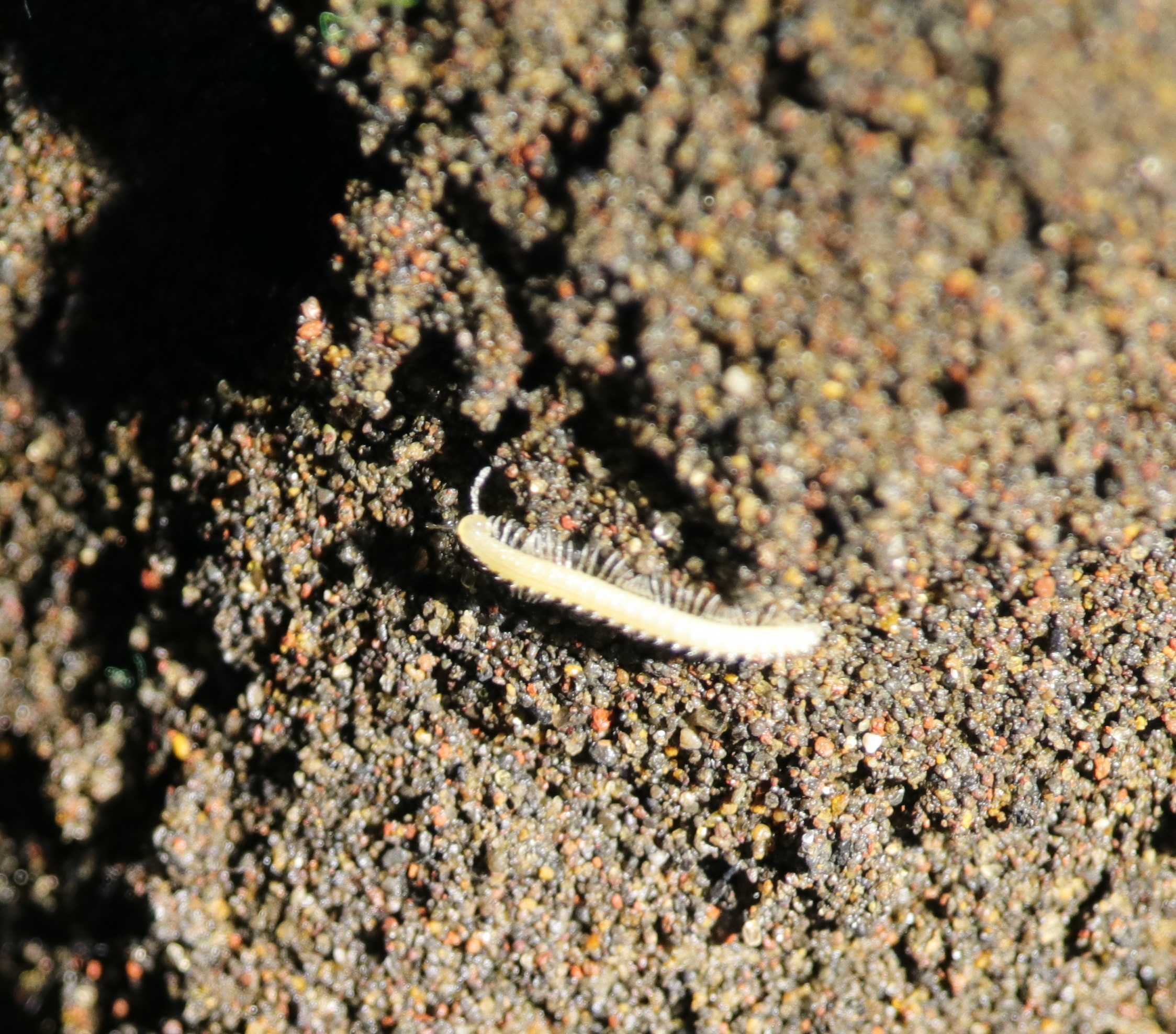
- A white Plumatyla humerosa millipede crawls on the floor of Lava River Cave

Scientific classification
- Kingdom: Animalia
- Phylum: Arthropoda
- Subphylum: Myriapoda
- Class: Diplopoda
- Order: Chordeumatida
- Family: Conotylidae
- Genus: Plumatyla
- Species: P. humerosa

Binomial name
- Plumatyla humerosa (Loomis, 1943)

= Plumatyla humerosa =

Genus of millipede

Plumatyla humerosa is a millipede species found in mines, as well as lava tube and limestone caves of northern California and south-central Oregon. It belongs to the family Conotylidae. The millipede is likely a troglophile with a white carapace and observed in lava caves though it may inhabit crevices as well. P. humerosa is observed frequenting areas with mold or bat feces on the cave floors. Taracus marchingtoni has been observed feeding on P. humerosa within cave habitat.

== See also ==
- Trogloraptor - a cave-dwelling spider of southern Oregon
