= Pressure ridge (seismic) =

Type of seismic fault

In seismology, a pressure ridge is a fault zone produced by compression.

A pressure ridge can range in size from a few-metres-long mound, to a kilometres-long lateral ridge. It is the result of one or several earthquakes occurring on certain types of fault geometries, such as compressional bends or stepovers along strike-slip faults. A pressure ridge can for instance be the result of a deep-set obstruction on the fault plane, which leads to material being pushed up during earthquakes.

== Mechanisms of formation ==
At depth, the compressional forces that produce a pressure ridge are accommodated by a positive flower structure, where upward-diverging fault strands splay from a deep master strike-slip fault and reverse-slip separations uplift the central block.

The Dragon's Back pressure ridge is formed by transpression as Pacific plate material is translated into a localized fault step on the North American plate, and high-resolution topographic studies show how its drainage basins and channels respond to the initiation and cessation of tectonic uplift.

== See also ==
- Pressure ridge (lava), in a lava flow
