= Oregon High Desert Grotto =

American caving club

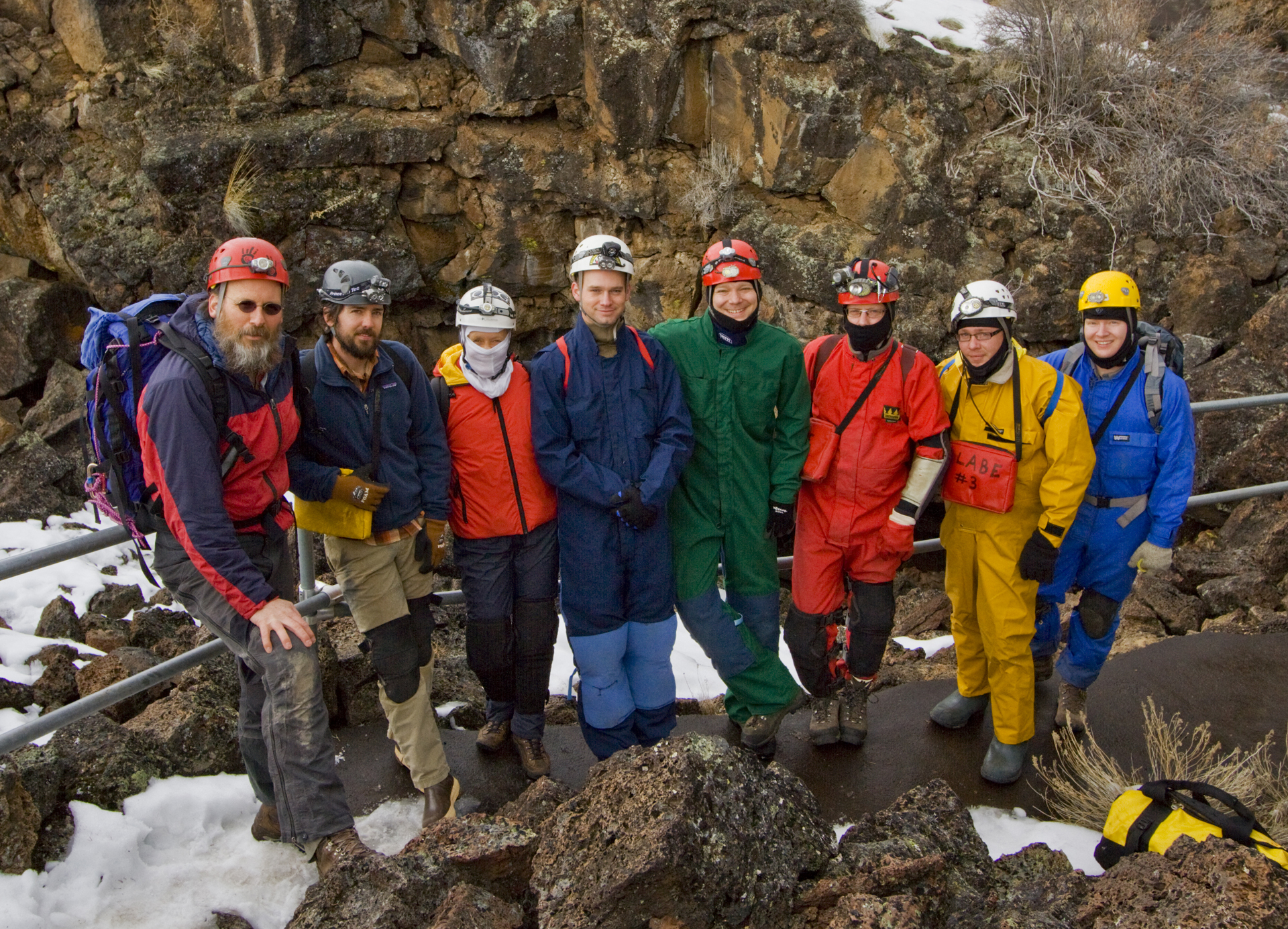
- Some members of the Grotto circa 2011
- Abbreviation: OHDG
- Formation: 1989
- Purpose: Cave exploration and protection
- Location: Central Oregon
- Main organ: Oregon Underground
- Parent organization: National Speleological Society
- Website: Oregon High Desert Grotto

The Oregon High Desert Grotto (or OHDG) is an American caving club, known as a Grotto. It is affiliated with the National Speleological Society.

OHDG is involved with caving and conservation efforts in central Oregon and beyond, including the Oregon Caves National Monument, the Lava Beds National Monument in northern California, and caves in western Idaho and southern Washington. Members of the Grotto have worked with the Department of State Lands and received a participation award from state leaders for their volunteer work. In 2013, the Grotto was recognized by Region 6 of the United States Forest Service for various volunteer hours working with caves and bats. They received the R6 Volunteers and Service and Program Award.

== History ==
The Oregon High Desert Grotto was first created in 1989 by Dan Best. It lasted only a year before complications terminated the Grotto. In June1995, the OHDG was reactivated by the new founding members Jeff Sims and Ric Carlson, who were at the time an employees of the United States Forest Service. The new officers were Jeff Sims, Chair, Ric Carlson, Vice Chair, Ryan Shuler, Secretary and Treasurer, Sarah Nichols. By 1997, the Grotto had over 30 members, a newsletter publication, and a growing knowledge of caves in the Central Oregon area and beyond. As of 2012, the OHDG continues to find new caves. Grotto member Matt Skeels has found over 100 new caves. Today, the Grotto is actively involved with caving in most of Oregon and the adjacent states.

== Exploration ==
Members of the Oregon High Desert Grotto understand that caves are a fragile resource. They are dedicated to preserving these special underground spaces. Each year, the group organizes a number exploration trips, study efforts, and preservation projects. The group’s exploration work includes caving adventures, cave surveys, and photographic documentation of cave resources.

While members of the Oregon High Desert Grotto have explored caves all over the western United States, the group’s focus is on Central Oregon. Most of the known caves in Central Oregon are in Deschutes County, the group's home area. The Oregon High Desert Grotto has identified 813 caves in Deschutes County, 660 of these are lava tubes. Of the remaining caves, the majority are also lava-related formations including vertical conduits, fissures, bubbles, and lava molds. Of the 813 caves, there are only 52 that were not created by lava flows. Many of these are rift or fissure caves, some up to 150 feet (46 m) deep. There are also a number of rock shelters, large rock overhangs created by water or wind erosion. These caves occur throughout Central Oregon, usually in rim rock areas. Finally, there are a few talus caves. Talus caves are found in cracks and open spaces between boulders along faults and in rock fall areas.

and mapping of the glacier-fumarole cave system at the summit of Mount Rainier in Washington. Some Central Oregon caves are easy to explore, especially the larger lava tubes. However, other caves require significant planning in order to be explored safely. Many require a strenuous hike just to get to the cave; and while underground, dark spaces and tight passages can be dangerous for anyone who is not prepared. As a result, members of the Oregon High Desert Grotto are careful to bring along the proper equipment for each caving trip. Explorers always wear helmets to protect their heads. Each person brings three sources of light, and members never go caving alone.

Members of the Oregon High Desert Grotto are always careful to protect wildlife. During the winter, grotto members avoid caves with hibernating bats. Waking a bat from hibernation is extremely stressful, and may cause the bat to expend its fat reserves prematurely which can lead to death later that winter or early spring. The group also avoids caves with bat maternity colonies during the summer months.

Over the last few years, the Grotto has been involved in the study and mapping of the Sandy Glacier Caves on Mount Hood in Oregon. Their efforts were recorded by Oregon Field Guide in 2013 and aired on OPB in October of that year.

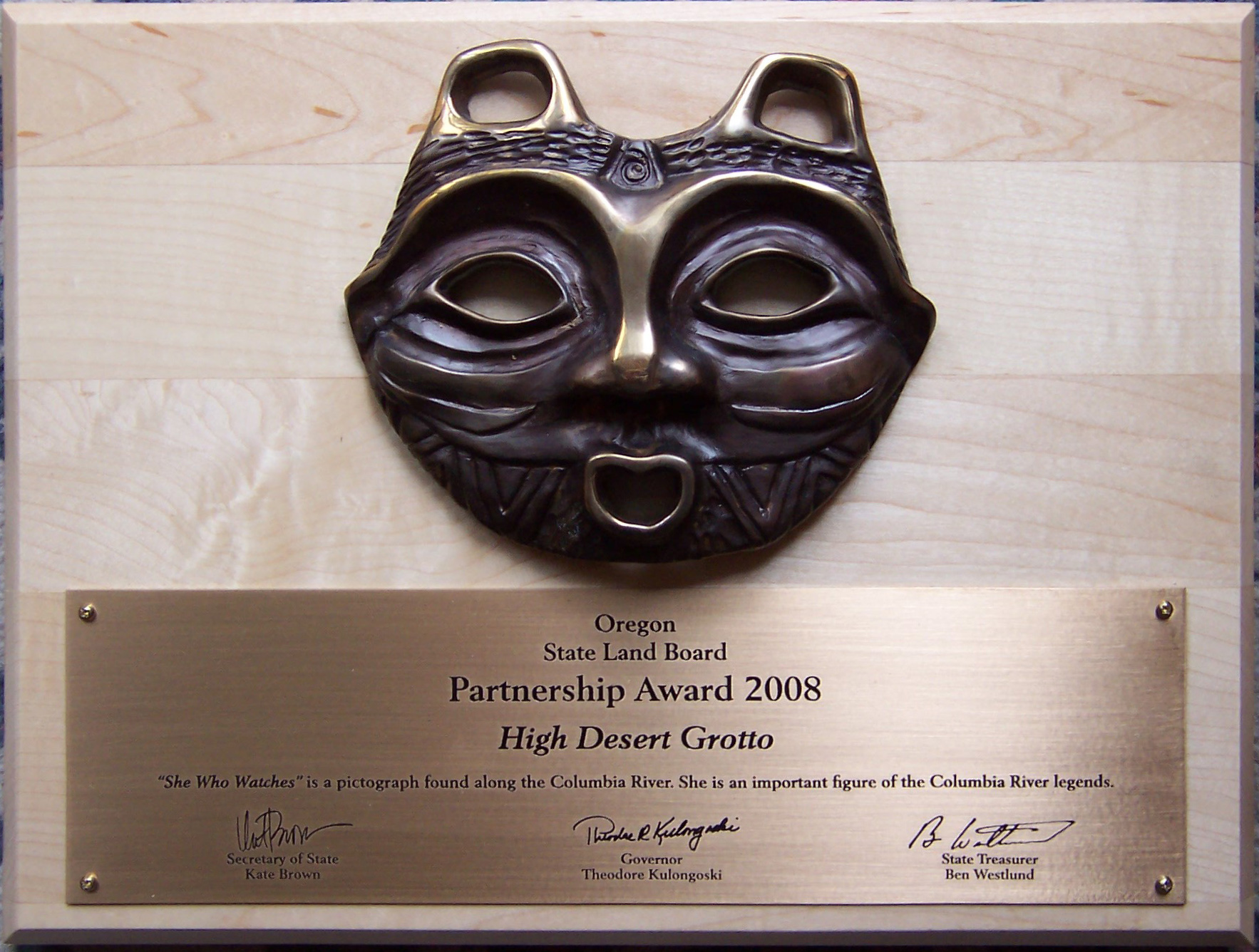
Partnership Award 2008 given to the Oregon High Desert Grotto for their work at the Stevens Land Tract in Bend, Oregon. Art by Linda Pitt.

The Grotto was also involved in the exploration.

== Conservation ==
The OHDG is an avid participant in conserving and restoring caves since many of the caves have been damaged from increased recreational activities, including rock climbing. The Grotto often partners with the United States Forest Service (USFS) to help manage the caves of the Deschutes National Forest. Cooperation with private owners of caves has also been done. On National Public Lands Day in September 2000, the Grotto participated in the gating of Stookey Ranch Cave. Cleanup trips to caves in the area are common and are synonymous with the caving motto: "Take nothing but pictures, leave nothing but footprints, kill nothing but time." In late 2010, missing lavacicles from Lavacicle Cave were reacquired by Grotto member Eddy Cartaya while working for the USFS. The lavacicles will be used as educational tools at Lava Lands Visitor Center.

The Grotto is involved with caving and conservation efforts beyond its local area of central Oregon. Grotto member Brent McGregor produced a video for the Oregon Caves National Monument promoting safe caving to conserve the off-trail parts of the cave. Other efforts have been done with Lava Beds National Monument in northern California, western Idaho, and Nevada. Ken Siegrist, of the Grotto and former employee of the Bureau of Land Management, has worked to protect many caves, including those of eastern and southern Oregon. Members of the Grotto have also worked in conjunction with the Department of State Lands and received a participation award from State leaders for their volunteer work with the state. Additionally, the Grotto along with land management agencies, has helped collect and discover millipedes, campodeans, arachnids, and the Taracus marchingtoni, some new to science. Neil Marchington has helped discover the Trogloraptor marchingtoni of southwest Oregon.
