= Pressure ridge (lava) =

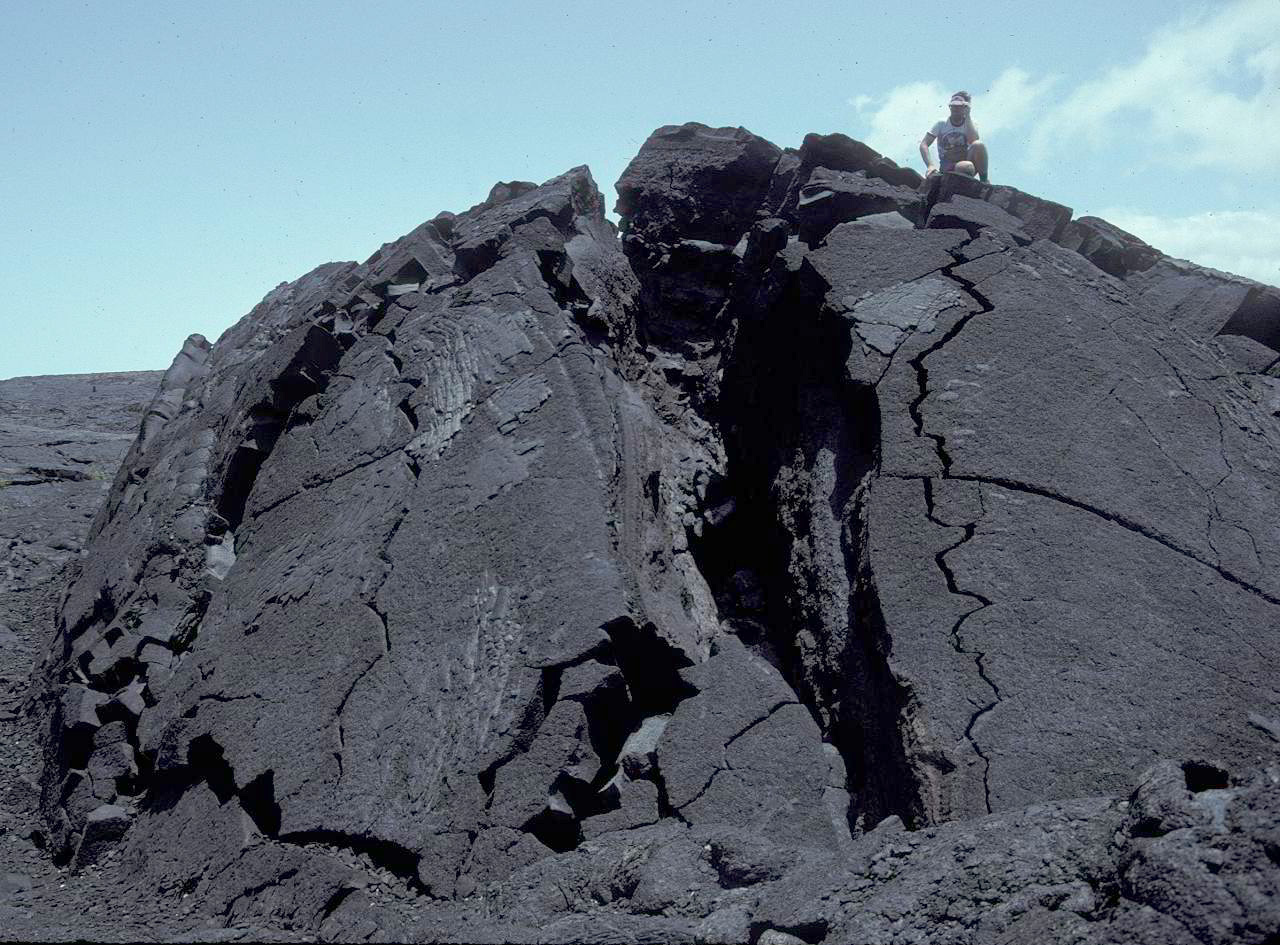
Pressure ridge

In volcanology, a pressure ridge or a tumulus (plural: tumuli), and rarely referred to as a schollendome, is sometimes created in an active lava flow.

== Formation ==
Formation occurs when the outer edges and surfaces of the lava flow begin to harden. If the advancing lava underneath becomes restricted it may push up on the hardened crust, tilting it outward. Inflation also takes place and is a process where the plastic layer of lava underneath expands as it cools and small crystals form. The result is a raised mound of hardened lava rock, usually a relatively narrow but long ridge. Tension cracks form on the surface of pressure ridges and run along the axis of elongated ridges, and at both edges of broader ridges, sometimes referred to as pressure plateaus. Along the edges of a pressure ridge, if the tension crack is large enough it will create a liftup cave. Other caves can form inside pressure ridges in which conditions arose for the ridge to form and but the lava that created the internal pressure quickly drained leaving an inflationary cave.

Pressure ridges may reach heights of 15 meters or more and lengths range more than 500 meters but most are less than 100 meters.

== Pressure plateaus ==
Similar to pressure ridges, pressure plateaus are uplifted areas of a ponded lava flow. Instead of narrow and elongated, pressure plateaus are generally wide and long with an amorphous shape. They are formed when the volume of lava funneled by a lava tube exceeds the capacity of the flow front to expand.

== See also ==
- Pressure ridge (seismic), in a fault zone
