= Lava cave =

Cave formed in volcanic rock, especially one formed via volcanic processes

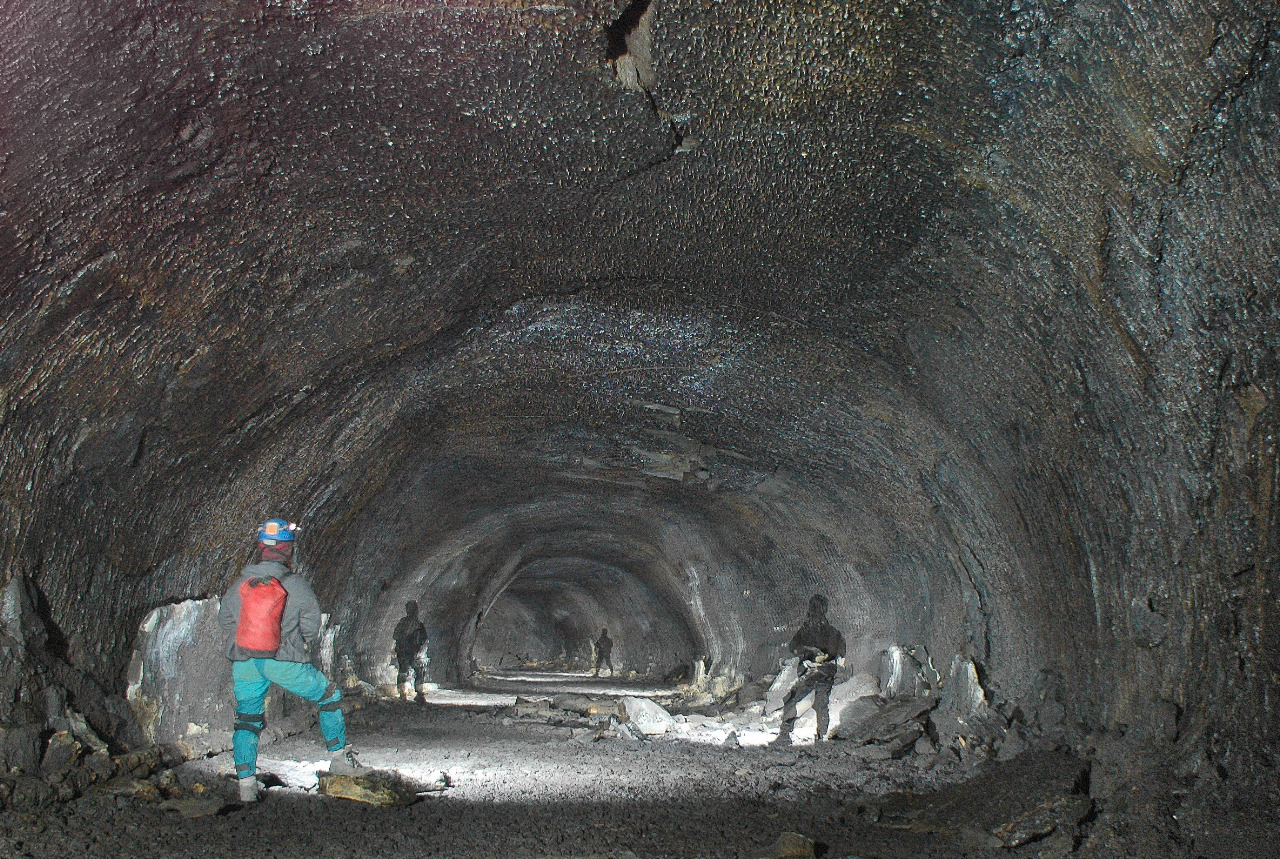
Classic lava tube passage in Lava Beds National Monument, California, US

A lava cave is any cave formed in volcanic rock, though it typically means caves formed by volcanic processes, which are more properly termed volcanic caves. Sea caves, and other sorts of erosional and crevice caves, may be formed in volcanic rocks, but through non-volcanic processes and usually long after the volcanic rock was emplaced.

== Types ==
=== Lava tubes ===
Lava tubes are the most common and extensive type of lava cave. Lava tubes usually form in pahoehoe lava flows, though exceptions exist. As the lava is emitted from the vent area, it spreads in the path of least resistance. The outer layers of the lava harden, while the interior forms horizontal conduits that channel the advance of the flow. These conduits are the beginning stages of lava tubes that serve to insulate the heat from the lava which then provides a way for the lava flow to advance longer distances. Dependent upon the slope, terrain, and lava viscosity, different kinds of lava tubes can form. Multilateral tubes are those that form paralleling, often branching and anastomosing tubes. Multilevel tubes are those that sit directly on top or underneath another tube, sometimes above or below several tubes. Some lava flows hold a mixture of multilevel and multilateral tubes. One other form a lava tube can take is the tube-in-tube which can form inside lava tubes if the linings of the walls are weak enough to lean inward, forming a new floor above the old. Tube-in-tubes are generally noted to form during the last lava draining through the main lava tube.

Some lava tubes are referred to as ice caves because they contain ice within.

=== Surface tube ===
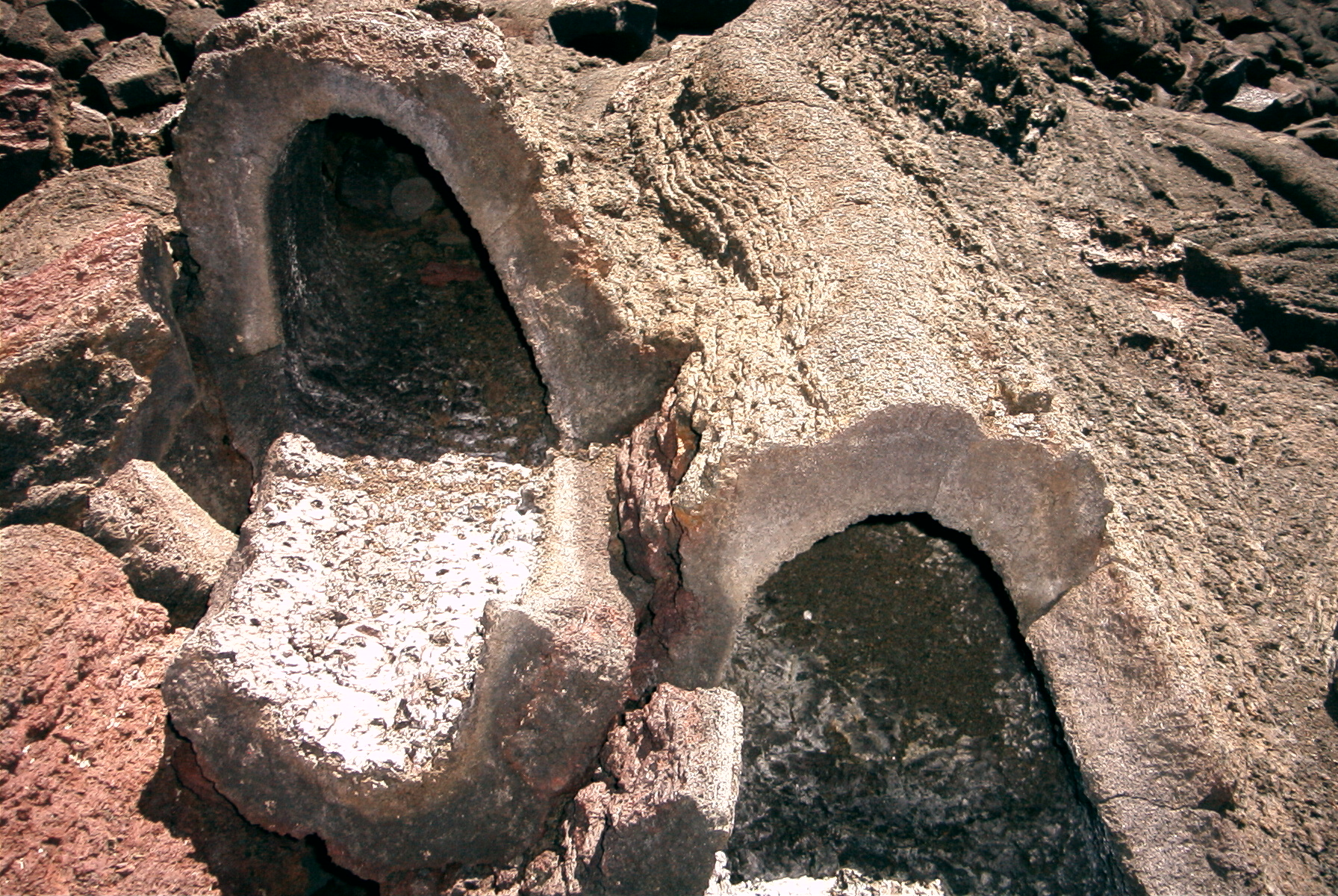
Small surface tubes

Surface tubes are small drained rivulets, or runners of the same highly fluid lava that flows in lava channels. They form on an existing hardened surface, and most are too small to enter. They are created by flowing lava that turns itself inside out. Sometimes referred to as "toes," they are thought to be instrumental in the growth (lengthwise) of lava tubes. They usually form when vents, channels, or reservoirs of lava overflow. They are very shallow and typically reside within the first few feet under the surface. Some surface tubes can connect to lava tubes deeper below the surface. Surface tubes typically have a uniform wall thickness and semi-circular cross section, flat side down against the surface where they formed. Branching is common and broadly dendritic networks are not unusual. Widths range from about four inches (a decimeter) to several yards (meters). Length depends primarily on an uninterrupted supply of lava and ranges widely. Surface tubes are far more numerous than is generally realized because most are subsequently buried.

=== Inflationary caves ===
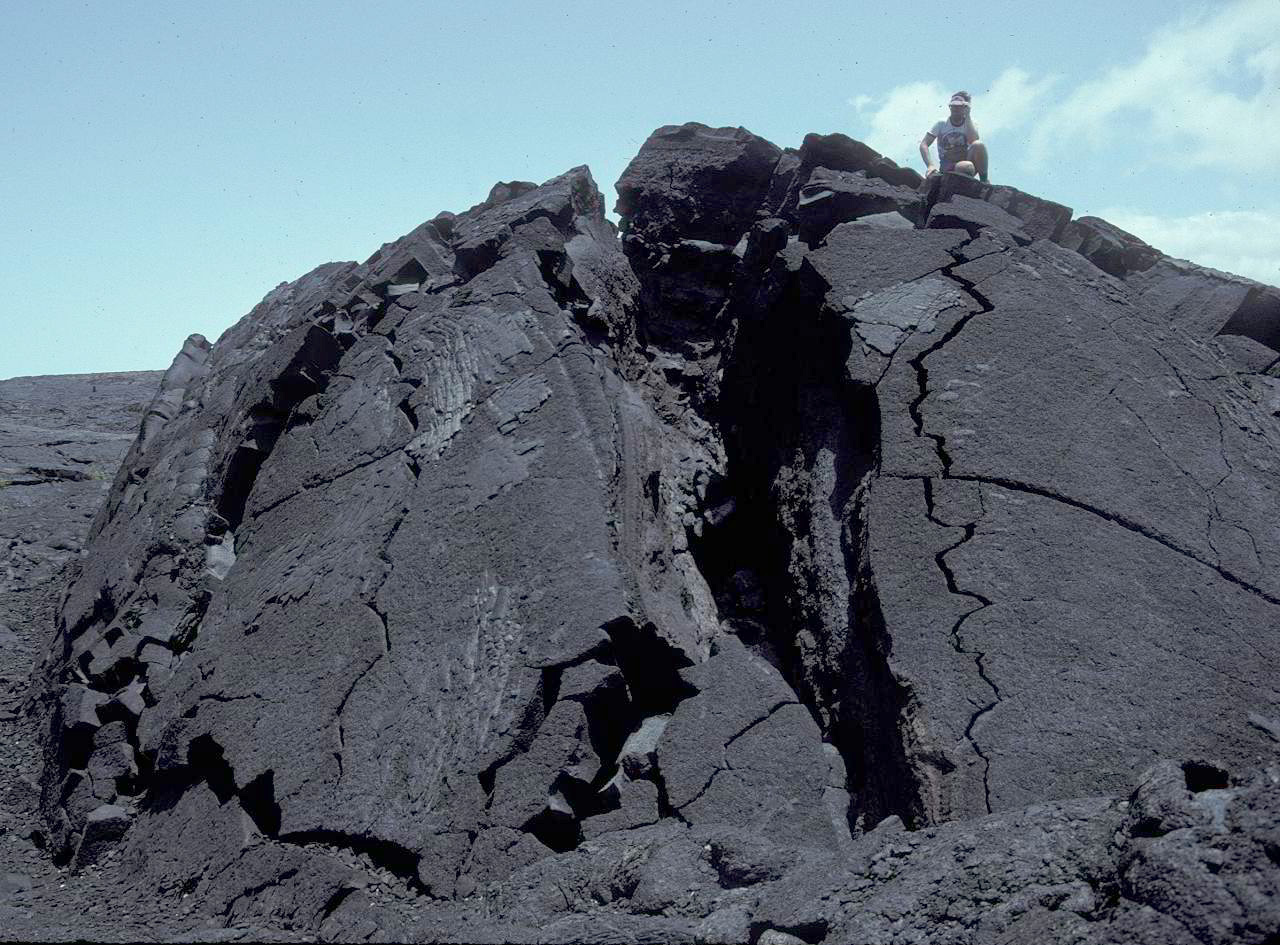
Inflationary caves can reside inside pressure ridges such as this one.

Inflationary caves tend to be small chambers that form when lava is pressurized and pushes exterior rock. The lava may then later drain leaving an inflationary cave. In some cases, volcanic gases may exert pressure on solid or semi-solid lava and form what is basically a bubble of thin rock called a blister. These blisters are at times big enough to qualify as a cave. Inflated caves can be mistaken for lava tubes because they often share many of the same characteristics. An example of inflationary caves can be found in pressure ridges. Pressure ridges are fractured lobes of hardened lava and may occasionally be hollow.

=== Liftup caves ===
Liftup caves are related to pressure ridges and the inflationary process. Liftup caves can form on the edges of pressure ridges or pressure plateaus where the convex edge of a ridge or plateau begins to expand outward it commonly leaves a void below. Liftup caves are usually no more than 5–10 feet (1.5–3.0 m) though longer ones have been discovered up to 30 ft (9.1 m) long.

=== Open vertical conduits ===
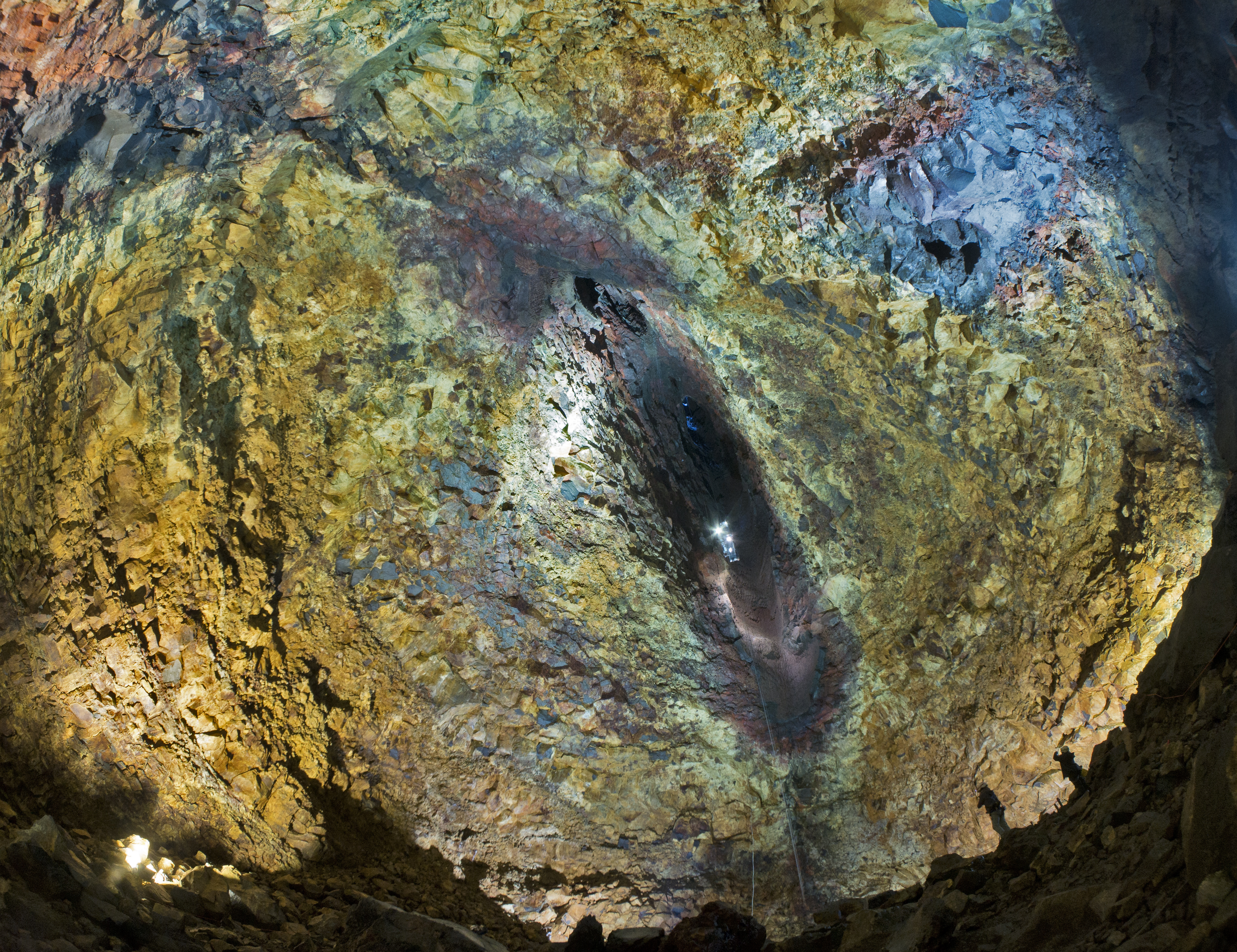
Looking up the volcanic throat of Thrihnukagigur in Iceland, an open volcanic conduit, from the former magma chamber.

Open vertical conduits, or OVCs, are vertical passages through which lava rose to the surface then receded. They have a round or oval-shaped passage. Depths range from a few feet to at least 165 feet, and diameters range from less than a foot to 25 feet. Their interior consists of remelted lining, usually adorned with short stalactites. OVCs usually, though not necessarily, form at the top of a vent structure like a spatter cone, spatter ridge, or hornito. Hornitos are open vertical conduits that form atop lava tubes. One of the deepest and most spectacular OVCs known is Thrihnukagigur in Iceland. It drops 120 meters from the surface to the upper floor of the magma chamber.

=== Pit craters ===
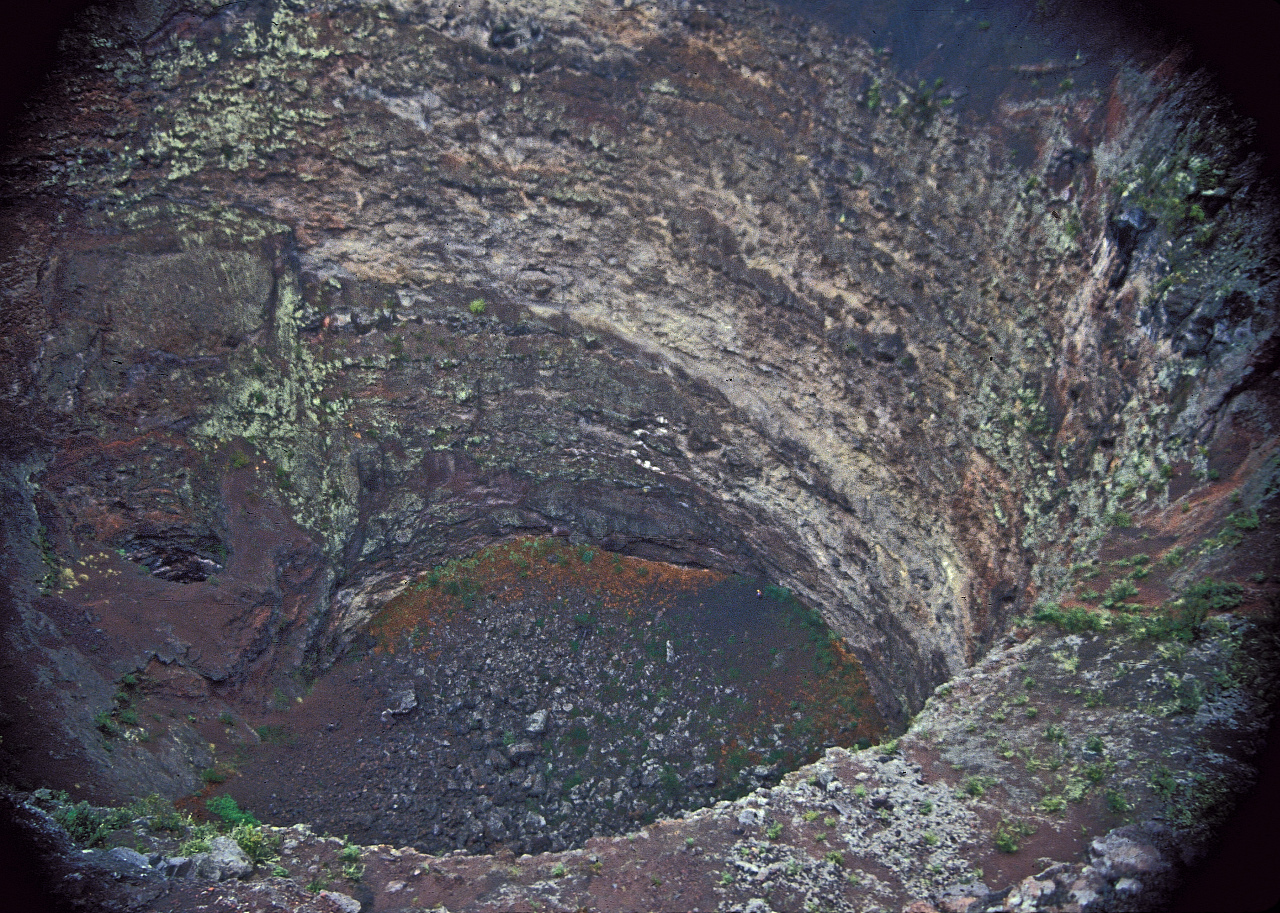
Pit crater with an inner pit, an open vertical volcanic conduit

Pit craters form when magma that doesn’t quite reach the surface drains to form a void, and the ground above it slumps. These huge open-air pits, with their sheer walls, are analogous to some of the large shafts that formed by solution, and typically require a roped descent for exploration. While most have no extension beyond the visible floor, others may have entrances into adjacent (now empty) magma chambers, such as was seen when the crater of Mauna Ulu in Hawai`i Volcanoes National Park was explored by a team of Swiss cavers. In Na One, a pit crater on Hualālai Volcano in Hawaii, a narrow opening at the bottom of an 430 feet (130 m)-deep pit crater leads into an open vertical volcanic conduit, with a total depth of 880 feet (270 m).

=== Rift caves ===
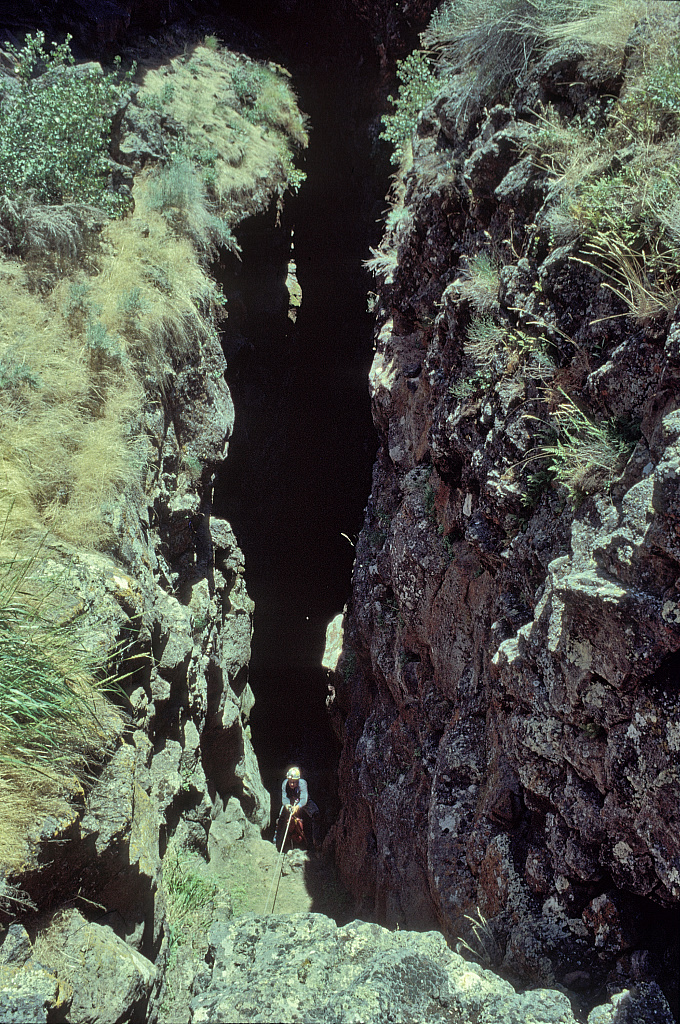
Rift cave

Rift or fissure caves, form along volcanic rift zones and eruptive fissures, or in fractures associated with volcanic activity. These are tectonic in formation, caused by stress in lava during and after solidification. They may also be the site of fissure eruptions, and the walls covered with spatter. Notable rift caves include Crystal Ice Cave, formed in Idaho’s Great Rift (and now part of Craters of the Moon National Monument and Preserve). Caves in the Great Rift are known up to 800 feet (240 m) deep.

=== Lava mold caves ===
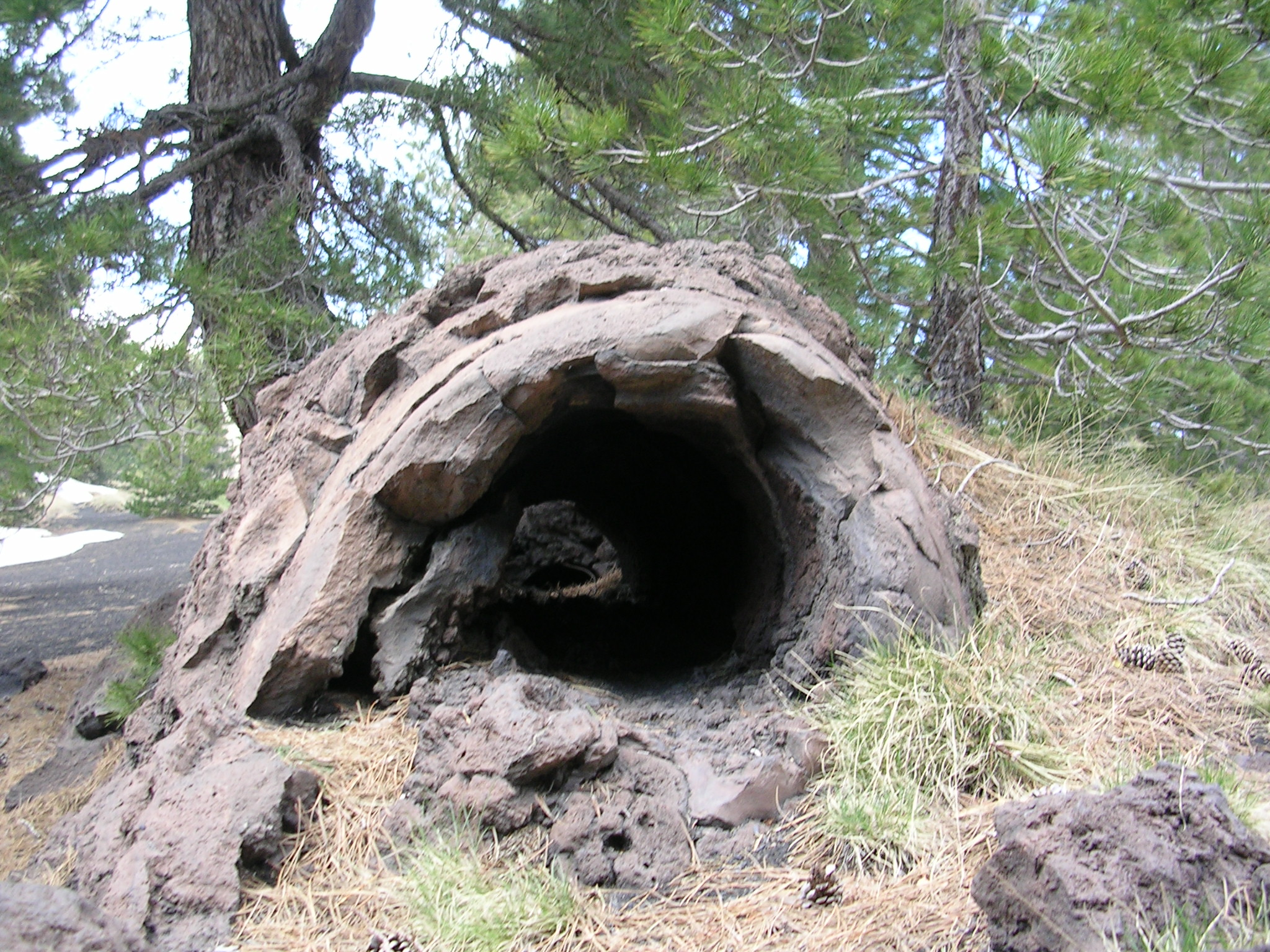
A lava mold of a tree trunk

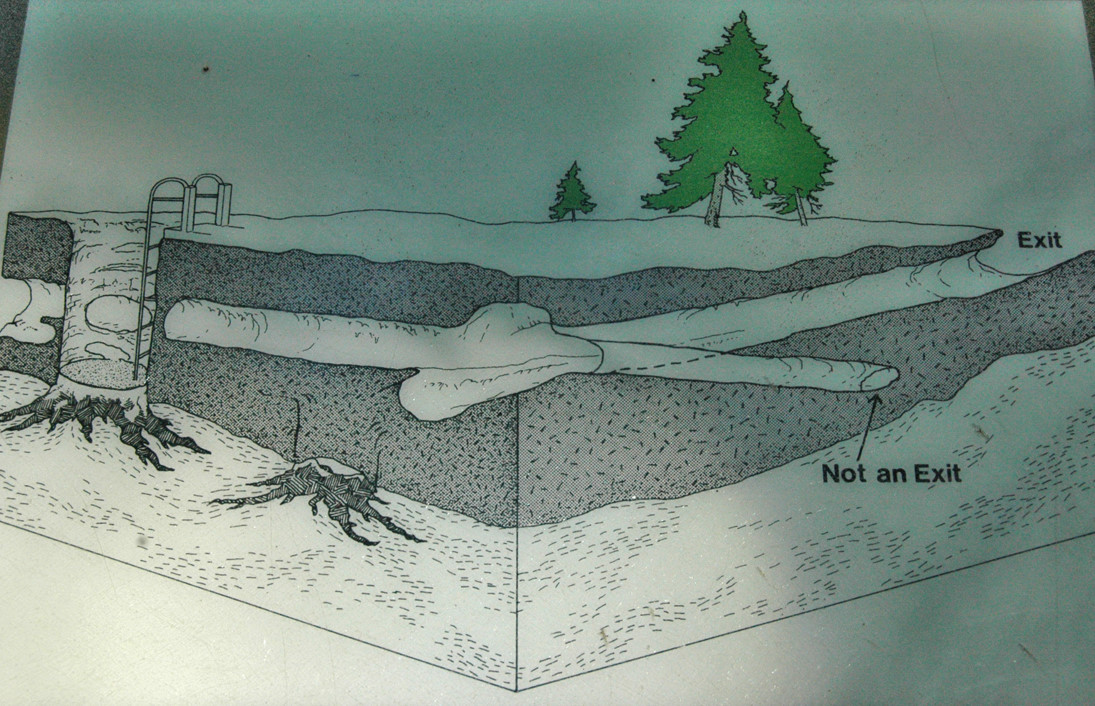
Lava mold cave diagram

Lava mold caves, sometimes erroneously called "lava casts", form when lava flows around trees (lava tree molds) or even large dead animals. The engulfed material eventually burns or decays away, but ends up leaving a hollow space with the original shape. Usually these are not very large but can get somewhat complex where groups of fallen logs were touching, and may then form caves that go in several directions where the resulting voids intersect. Such caves are known from Washington (US), near Ape Cave, and most notably from Japan in the Yoshida-tanai area. Elephant mold caves are known from the Nyiragongo volcano in Africa, and one in the shape of a Tertiary-age rhinoceros is known from Blue Lake, Washington.
