= Farmer's Journal (disambiguation) =

The Irish Farmers Journal is an Irish weekly newspaper.

Farmer's Journal or Farmers Journal, a commonly used title for periodicals in the realm of agriculture, may also refer to:

- Evans and Ruffy's Farmers' Journal, a British newspaper acquired by Bell's Weekly Messenger in 1832
- Farmer's Journal, a newspaper published in Quebec, Canada
- Farmer's Journal, a newspaper published in Danbury, Connecticut, U.S.(1790–1793)
- Gippsland Farmers Journal (1887–1932), an Australian twice-weekly, forerunner to Traralgon Journal and Record
- Jamestown Star and Farmer's Journal (1903–1946), an Australian newspaper absorbed into The Times and Northern Advertiser
- Mannum Mercury and Farmer's Journal (1912–1917), an Australian newspaper absorbed into The Courier
- Manufacturers and Farmer's Journal (1848–1907), a newspaper based in Providence, Rhode Island, U.S.
- Small Farmer's Journal, an American quarterly magazine
- The Washington Republican and Farmer's Journal, an American newspaper associated with Thomas Emmerson
