= Sisters High School =

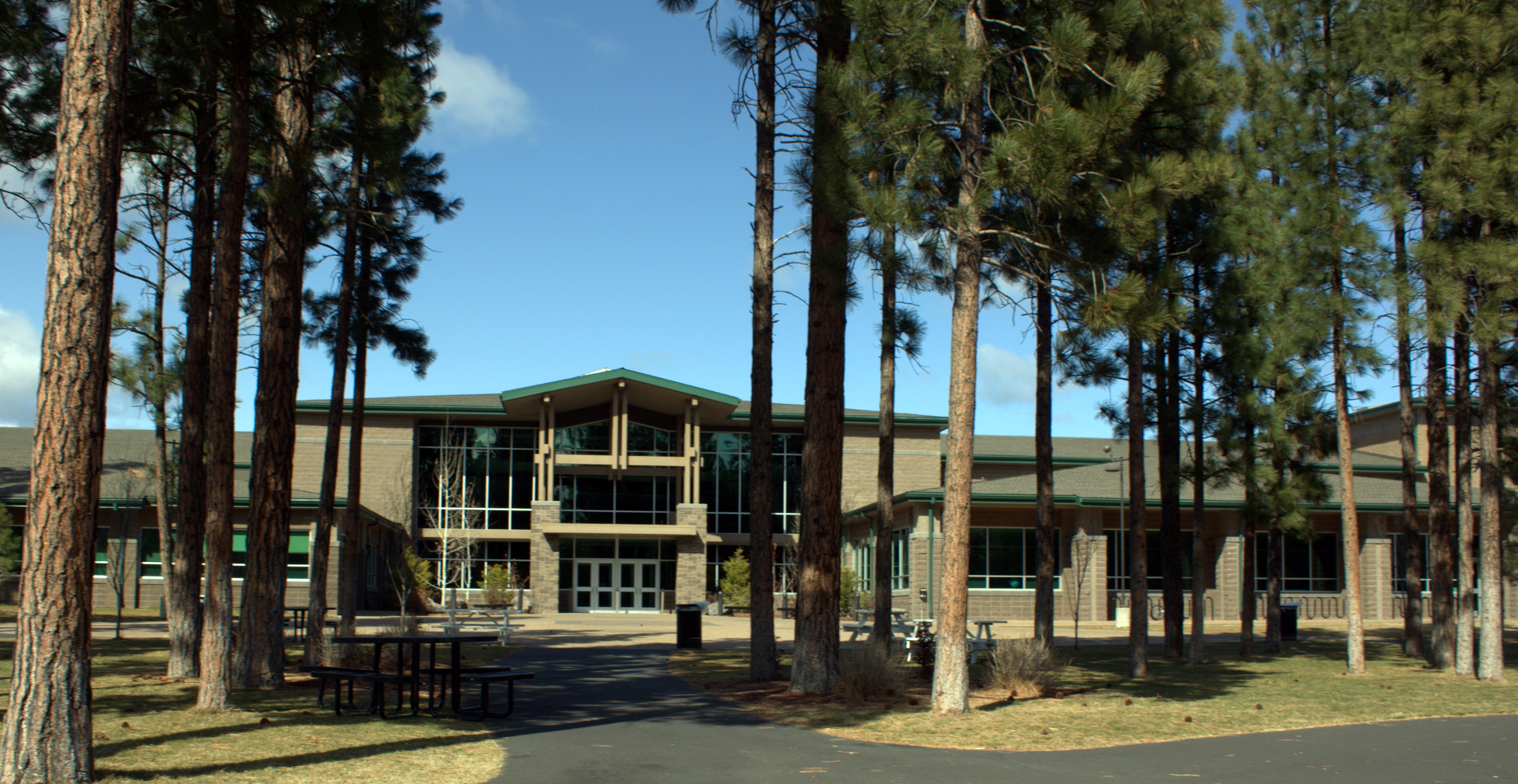

Location
- 1700 W McKinney Butte Rd, Sisters, Oregon 97759; United States; 44.2964°N 121.5761°W

Information
- Type: Public
- Established: 1937
- School district: Sisters School District
- NCES School ID: 411149000073
- Principal: Steven Stancliff
- Teaching staff: 25.01 (on an FTE basis)
- Grades: 9-12
- Enrollment: 396 (2023-2024)
- Student to teacher ratio: 15.83
- Colors: Black and white
- Athletics conference: OSAA 3A-4 Mountain Valley Conference
- Team name: Outlaws
- Website: highschool.ssd6.org

Sisters High School is a public high school in Sisters, Oregon, United States. It is a part of the Sisters School District.

== History ==
The first school in Sisters was opened in 1885. It was a one-room schoolhouse about two miles north of the center of town. This building was replaced by one in Sisters proper in 1890, with a two-room schoolhouse being built in 1900 on the site of Sisters Elementary School and expanded to six rooms in 1912. The high school finally received its own building in 1937, adding a library, office, and gymnasium in four Quonset huts during an expansion in 1949. The high school was among the first in Oregon to teach on-site conservation classes.

Closing Sisters High School became a significant political issue in the mid-1960s. Four referendums were held on the issue on whether to close the high school. The final one was held in July 1967; 155 people voted in favor of the closure and 39 people voted against. Accordingly, the district began sending high school students to Redmond High School. At the time, 80 high school students lived in Sisters. The Redmond Spokesman and The Bulletin argued the decision was correct, stating that the Sisters district had an insufficient tax base to provide the funding to keep the high school open.

By 1989, there was a significant increase of students in the Sisters area, causing the district to have several options on how to deal with the issues. Due to this, the school board voted to reopen the local high school in a new junior/senior high school building in 1992. The old high school building was repurposed as the school district offices.

In 2023, a television studio at Sisters High School was built. The student body had significant input in the design and a role in the building of it. Weekly news reports began in 2024. In 2024 a class on audiovisual media, titled, "Outlaw Media," began to be in the course catalog.

== Notable alumni ==
- Charity Gaye Finnestad, author
- Susan Hyde, political scientist
