= Sisters, Oregon =

- City
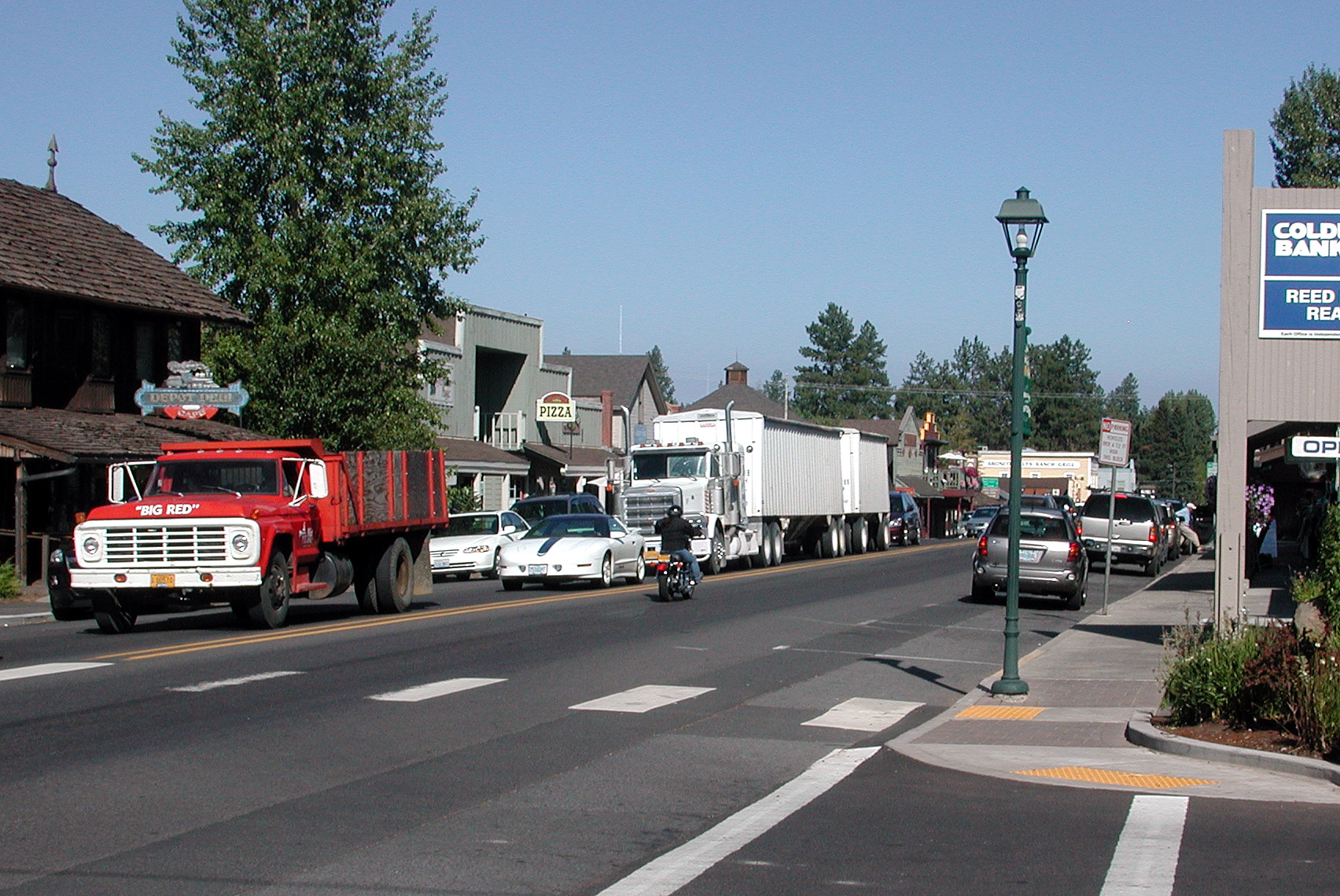
- Cascade Avenue in downtown Sisters
- Motto: "The West at its best"
- Location in Oregon
- Coordinates: 44°17′34″N 121°33′11″W
- Country: United States
- State: Oregon
- County: Deschutes
- Incorporated: 1946

Area
  - Total: 1.93 sq mi (5.01 km^{2})
  - Land: 1.93 sq mi (5.01 km^{2})
  - Water: 0 sq mi (0.00 km^{2})
- Elevation: 3,189 ft (972 m)

Population (2020)
  - Total: 3,064
  - Density: 1,585.4/sq mi (612.11/km^{2})
- Time zone: UTC-8 (Pacific)
  - Summer (DST): UTC-7 (Pacific)
- ZIP code: 97759
- Area code: 541
- FIPS code: 41-67950
- GNIS feature ID: 2411907
- Website: www.ci.sisters.or.us

Sisters is a city in Deschutes County, Oregon, United States. It is part of the Bend, Oregon Metropolitan Statistical Area. The population was 3,064 at the 2020 census.

The community takes its name from the nearby Three Sisters mountains.

== History ==
=== Pre-European history ===
Human activity before the arrival of the Europeans was present in the area, and the local natives of various clans traversed the regions, creating various trails that passed through Warm Springs, and some crossing the Cascade passes of McKenzie and Santiam. The various ethnic groups that composed the demographic of the area at the time were Paiute, Warm Springs, and Wasco peoples.

=== First European settlements ===
The first notable European presence in the area was the construction of Camp Polk, which existed from September 1865 to May 1866, just 3 miles away from the current location of the town. After the site was abandoned, in 1870, Samuel M. Hindman was the first to settle the area properly, even building a shop and a post office.

In 1888 the post office was relocated to the John J. Smith Store, which was located three miles south of Camp Polk. The name for the rebranding of the post office was the "Three Sisters". The name's origin is still quite uncertain, however according to a theory, the mountains that inspired the name were named in the 1840s by members of a Methodist mission based in Salem, hinting at an alleged earlier European presence. However due to unknown reasons, the postal authorities shortened it to "Sisters".

It seems that the early growth of the city can be attributed to various factors, such as sheep traffic over the Santiam wagon road, and its location at the intersection of the McKenzie and Santiam roads.

=== Recent history ===
Sister, 1930

20 years after the opening of the local post office, on July 10, 1901, two enterprising brothers, Alex and Robert Smith, officially platted the City of Sisters.

By the turn of the century, cattle raising had replaced sheep herding as the main industry in the region, leading to the town needing to re-invent itself. The town started to focus on cattle-raising, primarily due to the contribution of the local Black Butte Land & Livestock Company.

After a while, the city re-invented its economy once again, now looking at the logging industry, with the building of the Duckett & Spoo mill in 1914. It is worth noting though that this industry, whilst not as prosperous earlier on, also existed as far back as the 1890s in the area.

Between 1923 and 1924, two fires hit the town, almost destroying it. The event was so traumatic to inspire writer Raymond R. Hatton recounted the terrible events in his book, “Oregon’s Sisters Country”:

“On May 11, 1923, fire broke out in an untenanted garage, spread rapidly and leveled one entire block of town … The fire destroyed 10 buildings — some businesses, some residences — within 15 minutes after the first alarm.... The next year, late in the afternoon on September 11, fire once again broke out and raced through parts of Sisters,”

— Raymond R. Hatton, Oregon's Sisters Country

Records from the time seem to indicate that several hundred people from the area gathered to watch the blaze, which could be seen from neighbouring towns and nearby areas.

However, despite the setback caused by the fires, the town rebuilt, and grew.

By the 1930s, Sisters was starting to be known locally as a lumber-producing town and was incorporated in 1946. Everything seemed to be fine, and the population had reached its historic peak of 500 inhabitants, however, lumber production fell off and in 1963 the last mill in Sisters was closed. This led to the demographic of the city to drastically fall.

However in the 70s, the town would have a turn for the better when Brooks Resources, the developers of Black Butte Ranch, decided they needed a place for the residents of the nascent resort which they planned to construct, to shop.

By 1974, the Sisters Area Chamber of Commerce was formed, and the development of the local infrastructures and roads led to the city to develop its own stable economy and to prevent further demographic losses.

The town took serious blows from the 2008 economic crisis and the coronavirus pandemic which restricted economic activity (by limiting tourism) and also put the life of the local population at risk.

== Geography ==
According to the United States Census Bureau, the city has a total area of 1.87 square miles (4.84 km^{2}), all land.

The Santiam Highway (U.S. Route 20) and the McKenzie Highway (Oregon Route 126) merge briefly to form Cascade Avenue, the main thoroughfare through downtown Sisters. On Cascade Avenue, there is a lot of pedestrian traffic and many specialty stores and galleries. East of Sisters the two highways split, with 126 heading to Redmond and 20 going to Bend. West of Sisters, the road splits once more, with the McKenzie Highway becoming Oregon Route 242 and running west over the McKenzie Pass (a summertime-only scenic route over the Cascades.) The Santiam Highway proceeds over the Santiam Pass.

=== Climate ===
This region experiences warm (but not hot) and dry summers, with no average monthly temperatures above 71.6 °F (22.0 °C). According to the Köppen Climate Classification system, Sisters has a warm-summer Mediterranean climate, abbreviated "Csb" on climate maps.

Climate data for Sisters, Oregon (1991–2020 normals, extremes 1958–2024)
Month	Jan	Feb	Mar	Apr	May	Jun	Jul	Aug	Sep	Oct	Nov	Dec	Year
Record high °F (°C)	65 (18)	72 (22)	78 (26)	87 (31)	98 (37)	109 (43)	109 (43)	106 (41)	103 (39)	92 (33)	73 (23)	66 (19)	109 (43)
Mean daily maximum °F (°C)	40.8 (4.9)	43.9 (6.6)	50.6 (10.3)	57.1 (13.9)	66.3 (19.1)	74.2 (23.4)	85.6 (29.8)	84.5 (29.2)	75.8 (24.3)	61.3 (16.3)	47.4 (8.6)	39.3 (4.1)	60.6 (15.9)
Daily mean °F (°C)	30.8 (−0.7)	32.9 (0.5)	37.9 (3.3)	43.0 (6.1)	50.4 (10.2)	56.6 (13.7)	64.5 (18.1)	63.5 (17.5)	55.9 (13.3)	44.9 (7.2)	35.9 (2.2)	29.6 (−1.3)	45.5 (7.5)
Mean daily minimum °F (°C)	20.8 (−6.2)	21.9 (−5.6)	25.2 (−3.8)	28.8 (−1.8)	34.4 (1.3)	39.0 (3.9)	43.4 (6.3)	42.4 (5.8)	36.0 (2.2)	28.6 (−1.9)	24.5 (−4.2)	19.8 (−6.8)	30.4 (−0.9)
Record low °F (°C)	−28 (−33)	−22 (−30)	−9 (−23)	9 (−13)	11 (−12)	16 (−9)	24 (−4)	25 (−4)	15 (−9)	−4 (−20)	−16 (−27)	−28 (−33)	−28 (−33)
Average precipitation inches (mm)	1.74 (44)	1.36 (35)	1.31 (33)	0.77 (20)	1.53 (39)	1.01 (26)	0.55 (14)	0.60 (15)	0.54 (14)	1.09 (28)	2.17 (55)	2.53 (64)	15.20 (386)
Source: NOAA

== Demographics ==
Historical population
Census	Pop.	Note	%±
1950	723		—
1960	602		−16.7%
1970	516		−14.3%
1980	696		34.9%
1990	679		−2.4%
2000	959		41.2%
2010	2,038		112.5%
2020	3,064		50.3%
U.S. Decennial Census

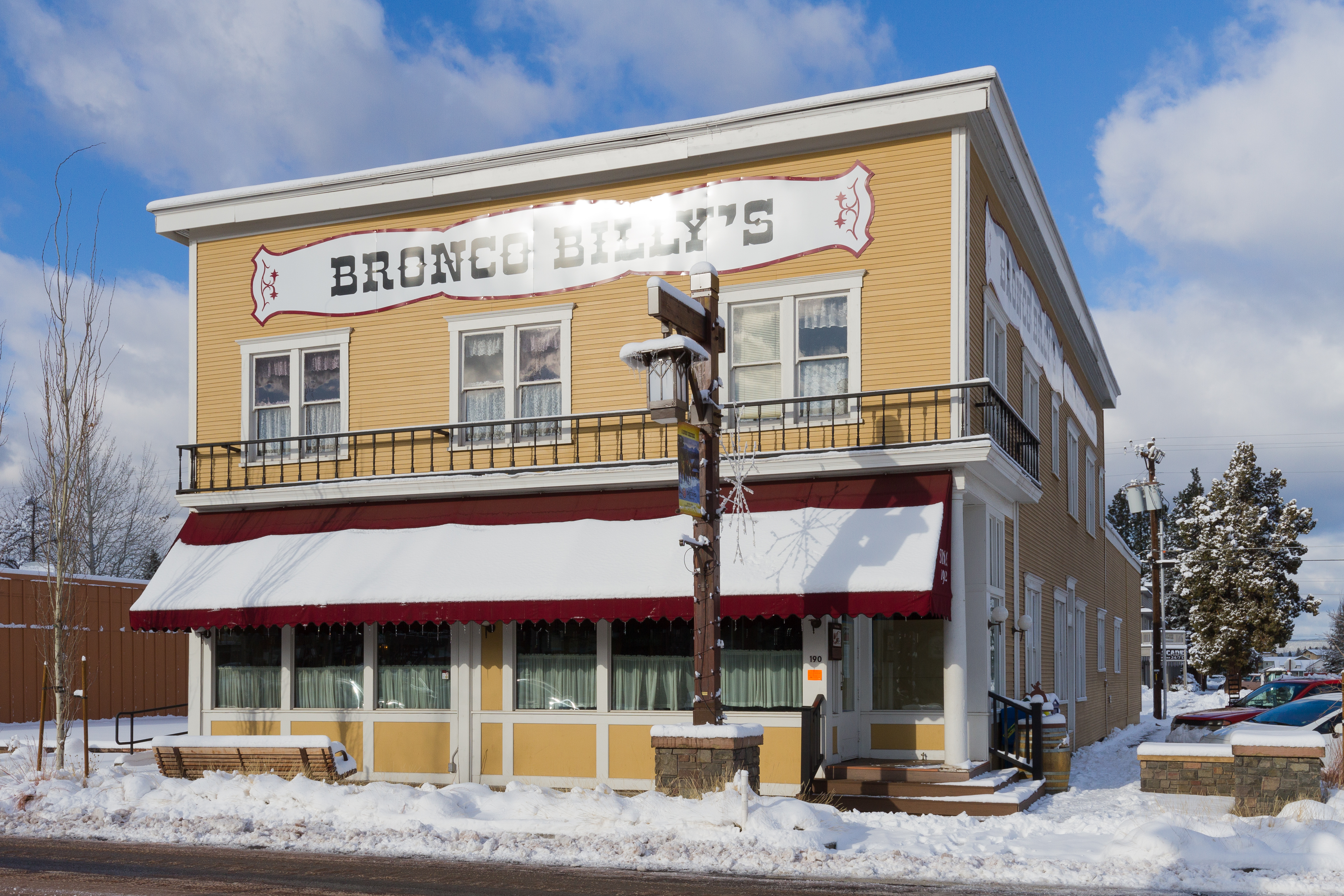
Former Hotel Sisters, built in 1912 by local businessman John Dennis

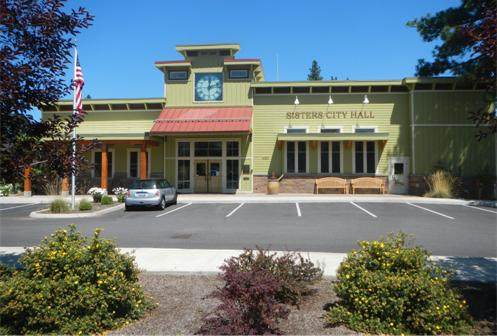
City hall

=== 2020 census ===
As of the 2020 census, Sisters had a population of 3,064. The median age was 48.3 years. 19.5% of residents were under the age of 18 and 27.9% of residents were 65 years of age or older. For every 100 females there were 87.1 males, and for every 100 females age 18 and over there were 84.7 males age 18 and over.

0% of residents lived in urban areas, while 100.0% lived in rural areas.

There were 1,342 households in Sisters, of which 26.8% had children under the age of 18 living in them. Of all households, 47.8% were married-couple households, 15.4% were households with a male householder and no spouse or partner present, and 30.4% were households with a female householder and no spouse or partner present. About 29.9% of all households were made up of individuals and 17.5% had someone living alone who was 65 years of age or older.

There were 1,661 housing units, of which 19.2% were vacant. Among occupied housing units, 62.9% were owner-occupied and 37.1% were renter-occupied. The homeowner vacancy rate was 3.4% and the rental vacancy rate was 9.6%.

Racial composition as of the 2020 census
Race	Number	Percent
White	2,690	87.8%
Black or African American	6	0.2%
American Indian and Alaska Native	20	0.7%
Asian	26	0.8%
Native Hawaiian and Other Pacific Islander	2	0.1%
Some other race	56	1.8%
Two or more races	264	8.6%
Hispanic or Latino (of any race)	194	6.3%

=== 2010 census ===
As of the census of 2010, there were 2,038 people, 847 households, and 557 families residing in the city. The population density was 1,089.8 inhabitants per square mile (420.8/km^{2}). There were 1,109 housing units at an average density of 593.0 per square mile (229.0/km^{2}). The racial makeup of the city was 93.9% White, 1.1% Native American, 0.7% Asian, 2.3% from other races, and 2.1% from two or more races. Hispanic or Latino of any race were 7.1% of the population.

There were 847 households, of which 32.3% had children under the age of 18 living with them, 48.1% were married couples living together, 13.7% had a female householder with no husband present, 4.0% had a male householder with no wife present, and 34.2% were non-families. 29.0% of all households were made up of individuals, and 12.2% had someone living alone who was 65 years of age or older. The average household size was 2.39 and the average family size was 2.92.

The median age in the city was 41.4 years. 26.3% of residents were under the age of 18; 6.5% were between the ages of 18 and 24; 21.9% were from 25 to 44; 30.4% were from 45 to 64; and 14.9% were 65 years of age or older. The gender makeup of the city was 48.1% male and 51.9% female.

=== 2000 census ===
As of the census of 2000, there were 959 people, 397 households, and 262 families residing in the city. The population density was 663.0 inhabitants per square mile (256.0/km^{2}). There were 482 housing units at an average density of 333.2 per square mile (128.6/km^{2}). The racial makeup of the city was 95.83% White, 1.56% Native American, 0.42% Asian, 1.36% from other races, and 0.83% from two or more races. Hispanic or Latino of any race were 4.59% of the population.

There were 397 households, out of which 33.0% had children under the age of 18 living with them, 49.6% were married couples living together, 11.8% had a female householder with no husband present, and 33.8% were non-families. 25.2% of all households were made up of individuals, and 8.8% had someone living alone who was 65 years of age or older. The average household size was 2.41 and the average family size was 2.88.

In the city, the population was spread out, with 26.1% under the age of 18, 9.0% from 18 to 24, 26.1% from 25 to 44, 25.0% from 45 to 64, and 13.9% who were 65 years of age or older. The median age was 39 years. For every 100 females, there were 98.1 males. For every 100 females age 18 and over, there were 103.7 males.

The median income for a household in the city was $35,000, and the median income for a family was $43,977. Males had a median income of $35,563 versus $21,771 for females. The per capita income for the city was $17,847. About 7.4% of families and 10.4% of the population were below the poverty line, including 2.3% of those under age 18 and 10.7% of those age 65 or over.

== Education ==
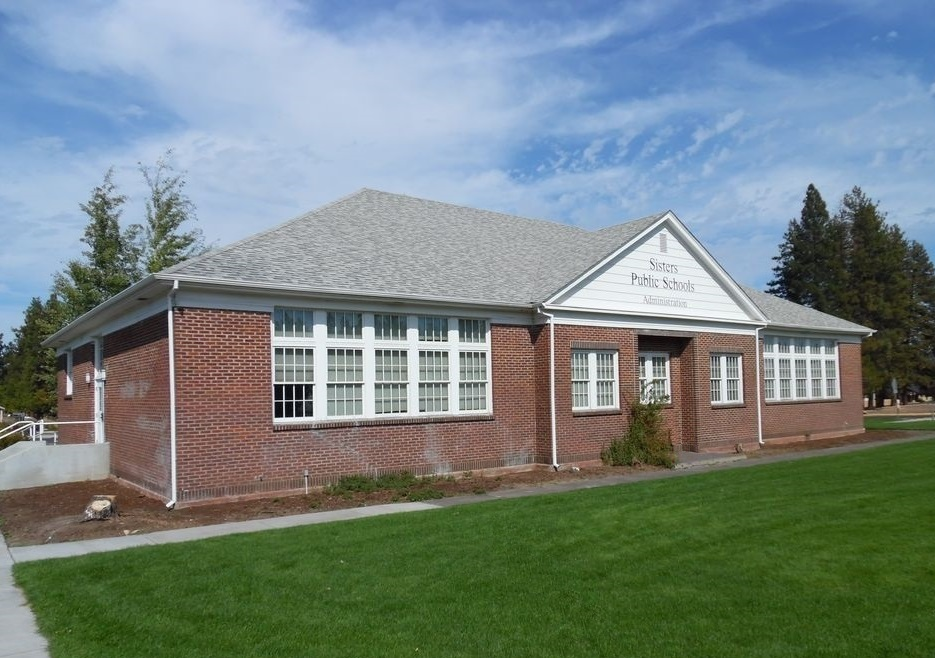
School district headquarters, the former Sisters High School

The Sisters area is served by Sisters School District, which is responsible for the education of approximately 1,300 students at four schools:

- Sisters Elementary School - Kindergarten through Grade 5
- Sisters Middle School - Grades 6 through 8
- Sisters High School - Grades 9 through 12
- Sisters High School Alternative Programs - Grades 9 through 12

From 1967 to 1992, Redmond High School was the designated high school of the Sisters School District, since the 1967 closing of Sisters High and before the 1992 reopening of that school.

Sisters was also home to Sisters Christian Academy, a non-denominational Christian school. It closed in 2020.

Deschutes Public Library operates the Sisters Library.

== Media ==
The local newspaper is The Nugget Newspaper, published weekly on Wednesdays. The Small Farmer's Journal also originates in Sisters.

== Events ==
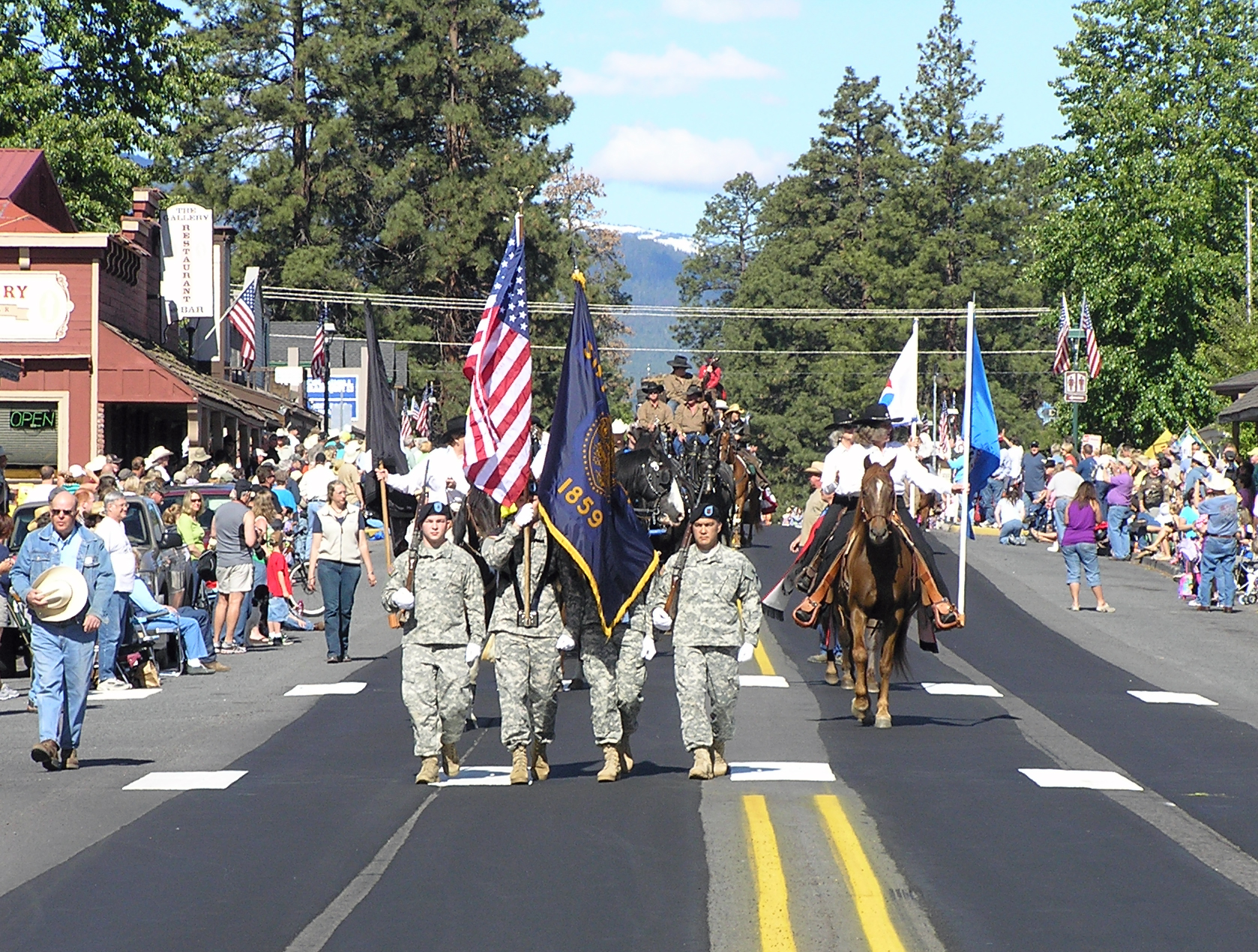
Rodeo parade

- The Sisters Rodeo is held the second weekend in June, held since 1941.
- Sisters Outdoor Quilt Show is on the second weekend of July.
- The Sisters Glory Daze Car Show is held in mid July
- Sisters Folk Festival is held the weekend after Labor Day in September.
- Fourth Friday Artwalk is a monthly event, occurring all year.
- Artists Studio Tour is held on the last weekend in September.

== Recreation ==
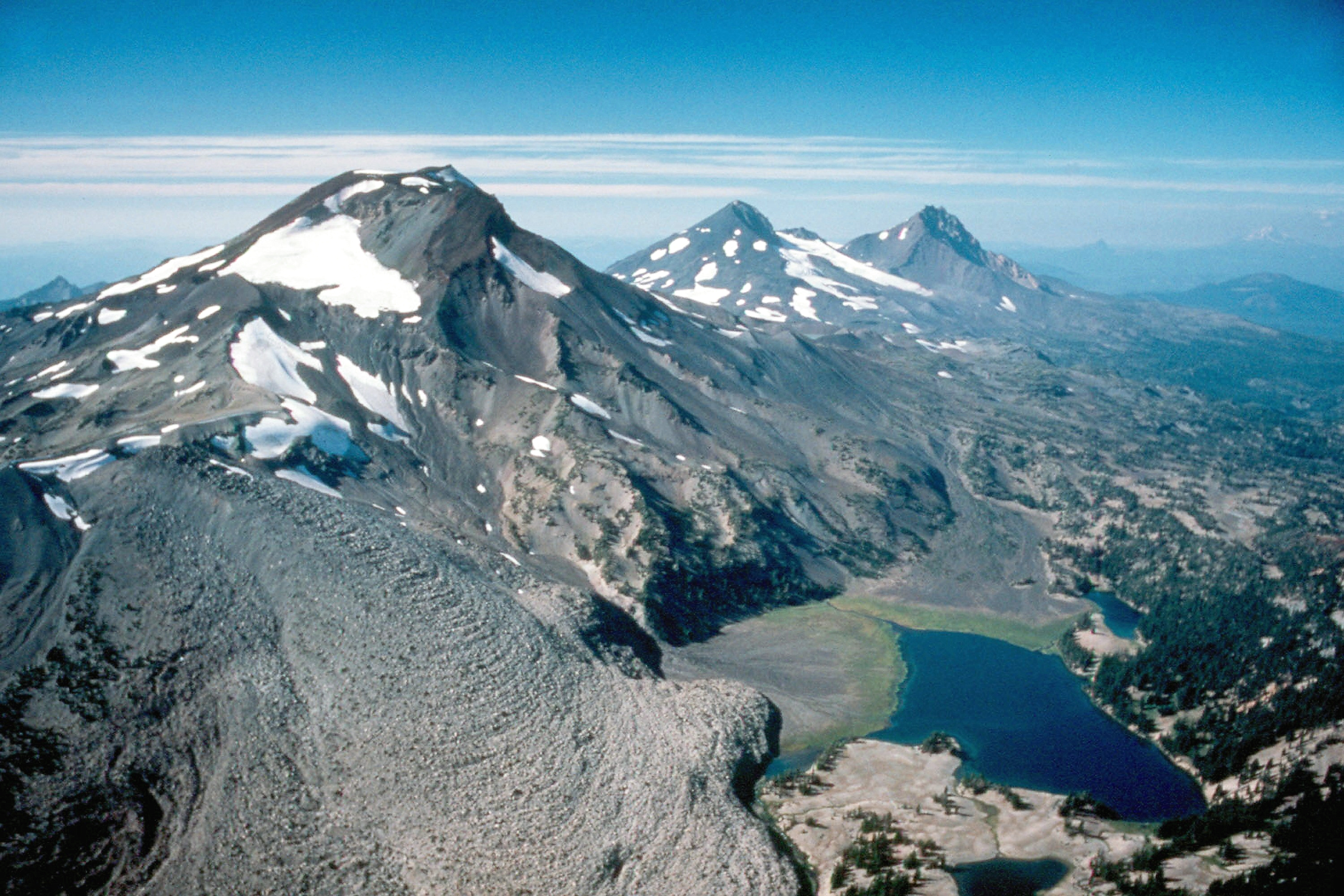
The Three Sisters, the city's namesake mountains

Sisters is the headquarters of the Sisters District of the Deschutes National Forest. The Sisters Ranger District Office is located at Pine Street and Highway 20. Hiking, biking and horse riding trails go from the city limits into the Three Sisters Wilderness. Sisters Trail Alliance builds and maintains hiking, biking and equestrian trails near the city.

The Sisters area is also home to several mountain biking trails, including the Peterson Ridge Trail and Suttle Lake trails.

Hoodoo ski resort and many snow parks are nearby.

Camp Tamarack is nearby. as is Big Lake Youth Camp operated by Seventh-day Adventists since 1963.

== Transportation ==
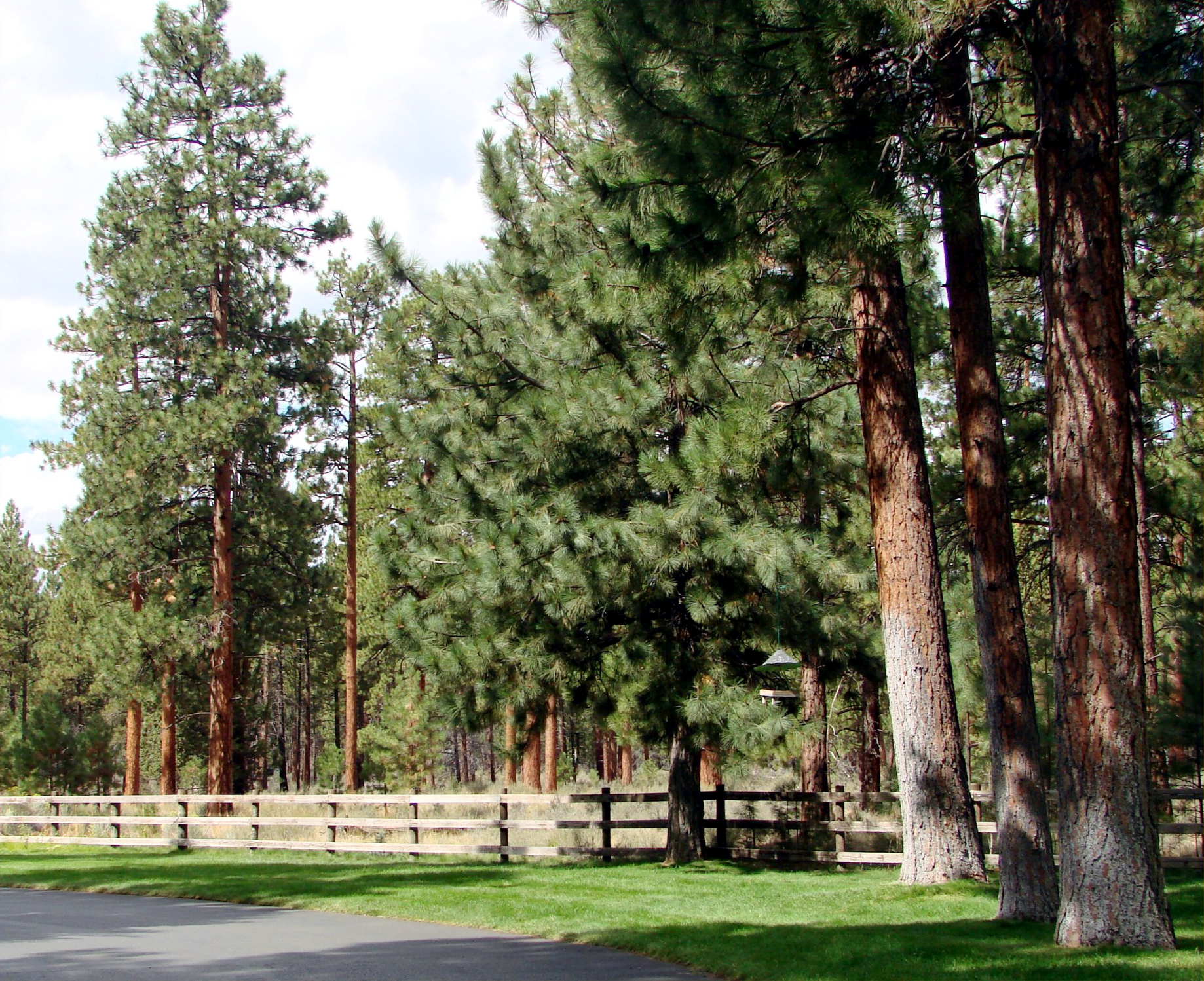
Forest in city

- Oregon Route 126
- Oregon Route 242
- U.S. Route 20
- Sisters Eagle Air Airport

== Notable people ==
- Jenny Boyd, actress
- Melody Carson, author
- Charity Gaye Finnestad, author
- Dan Fouts, former professional football player
- Susan Hyde, political scientist
- Chris Klug, Olympic snowboarder
- Ken Ruettgers, former professional football player
- Johnny Werhas, former professional baseball player
- Rainn Wilson, actor known for The Office
