= New Hope Christian College =

Private Bible college in Oregon, US

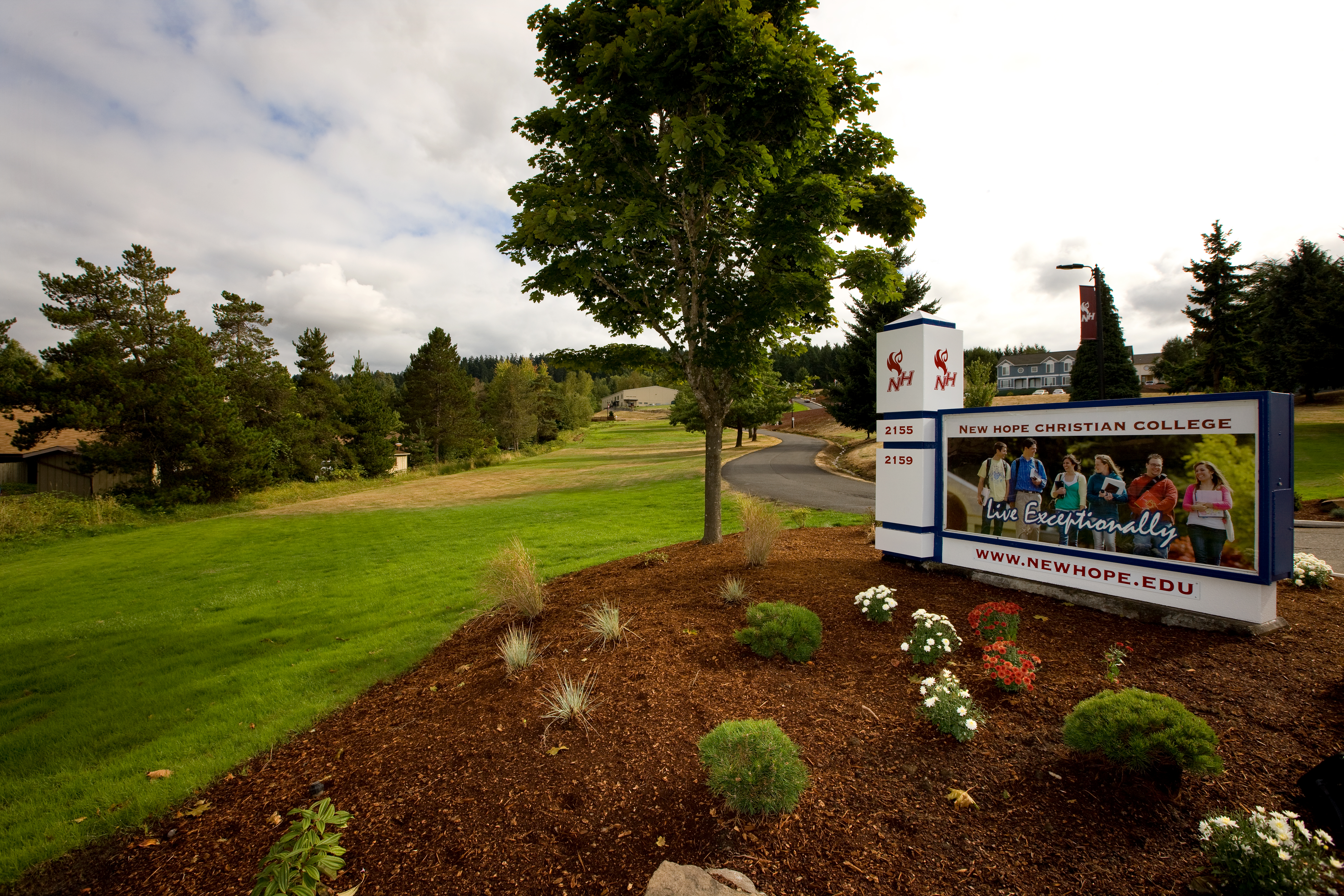
- New Hope Christian College Front Entrance.
- Former names: Eugene Bible College; Bible Standard College; Bible Standard Institute; Bible Standard Training School
- Motto: Equipping Students for Spirit-Empowered Leadership and Ministry
- Type: Private Bible college
- Established: 1925
- President: Wayne Cordeiro
- Location: Eugene, Oregon, U.S. 44.0319°N 123.1536°W
- Colors: Crimson and navy blue
- Nickname: Deacons
- Sporting affiliations: NCCAA
- Website: www.newhope.edu

New Hope Christian College is a private Bible college in Eugene, Oregon. It has a curriculum that centers on the vocational application of Biblical training including pastoral studies, Christian counseling, Christian education, intercultural studies, business, worship arts, and youth ministry.

== History ==
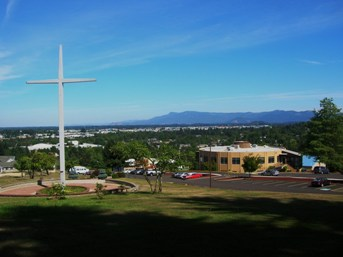
NHCC overlooks West Eugene

The school was founded by Fred Hornshuh in 1925. It was part of the Open Bible Churches denomination which originated from two revival movements: the Bible Standard Conference, founded in Eugene in 1919, and the Open Bible Evangelistic Association, founded in Des Moines, Iowa, in 1932.

The school began as the Bible Standard Training School, and was later known as the Bible Standard Institute, the Bible Standard College, Eugene Bible College, and finally New Hope Christian College.

In 1974, the school moved to its current campus site at 2155 Bailey Hill Road, overlooking west Eugene. The hilltop location displays a 70-foot-tall (21 m) cross, which was formerly on Skinner Butte from 1964 to 1997. It was installed on campus on June 24, 1997.

In 2009, the school joined the Pacific Rim Christian College Consortium, a group of three other colleges in Honolulu, Myanmar and Japan founded by alumnus Wayne Cordeiro. Cordeiro was appointed chancellor when NHCC, then still Eugene Bible College, joined the consortium. The name was changed to New Hope Christian College in June 2010.

== Accreditation and affiliation ==
New Hope Christian College is accredited by the Association for Biblical Higher Education. The college is affiliated with the Open Bible Standard Churches denomination and the church New Hope Christian Fellowship and incorporated in the State of Oregon.

== Athletics ==
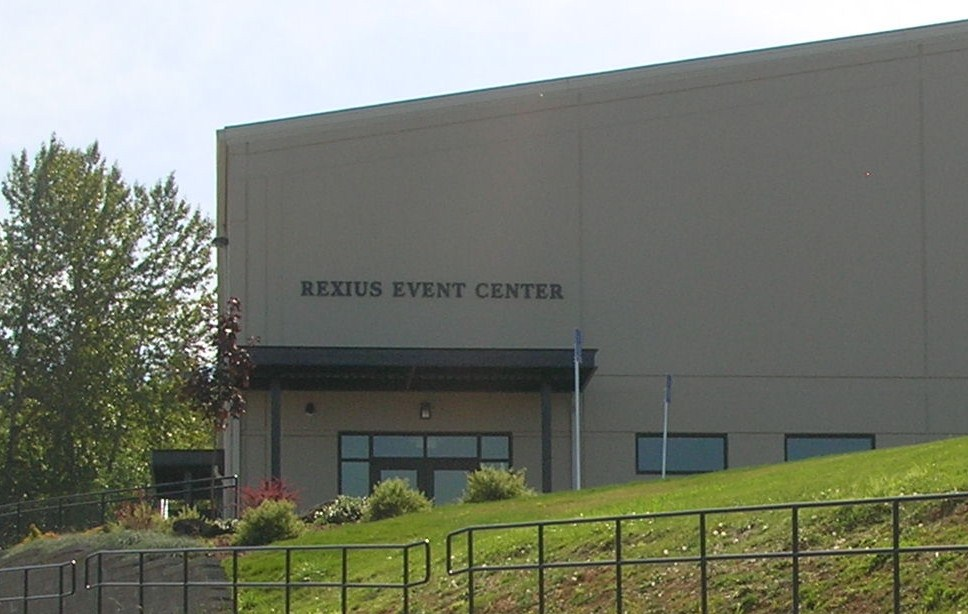
The Rexius Event Center houses Stewart Chapel and Cordeiro Court

The school's athletic teams compete as the Deacons in basketball, volleyball and soccer in the National Christian College Athletic Association. However, in the fall of 2020 NHCC dropped its league play with the NCCAA. They now only offer club sports, and non-collegiate on campus teams.

== Notable alumni ==
- Robert F. Burt, United States Navy admiral
- Wayne Cordeiro, pastor, writer, president of NHCC
- Charity Gaye Finnestad, writer
- Ruth MacLeod, writer
- Roger E. Olson, theologian
