= Sisters School District =

School district in Oregon, United States

Sisters School district #06
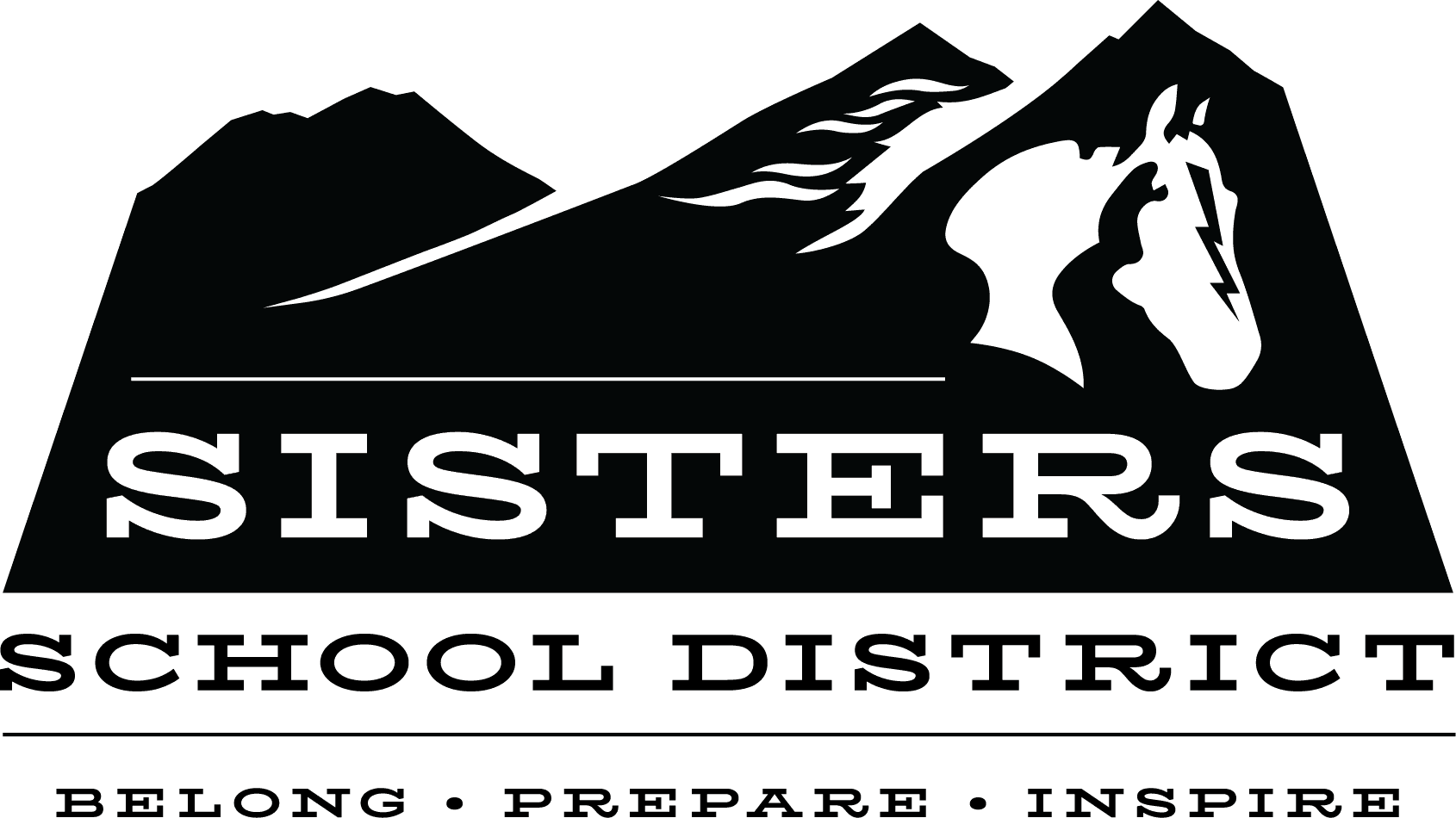

District information
- Grades: K-12
- Established: 1885
- Superintendent: Curtiss Scholl

Other information
- Website: www.district.ssd6.org

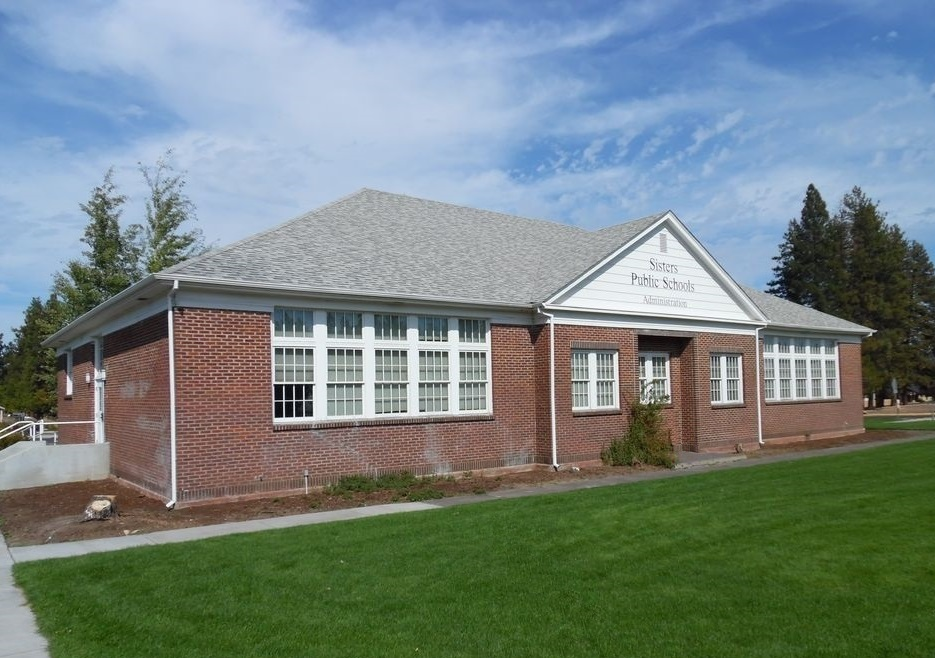
School district headquarters, the former Sisters High School

Sisters School District 6 (SSD), also known as Sisters Public Schools, is a school district headquartered in Sisters, Oregon. It operates Sisters Elementary School, Sisters Middle School, and Sisters High School.

The school district covers a portion of Deschutes County, and includes Sisters and Black Butte Ranch.

== History ==
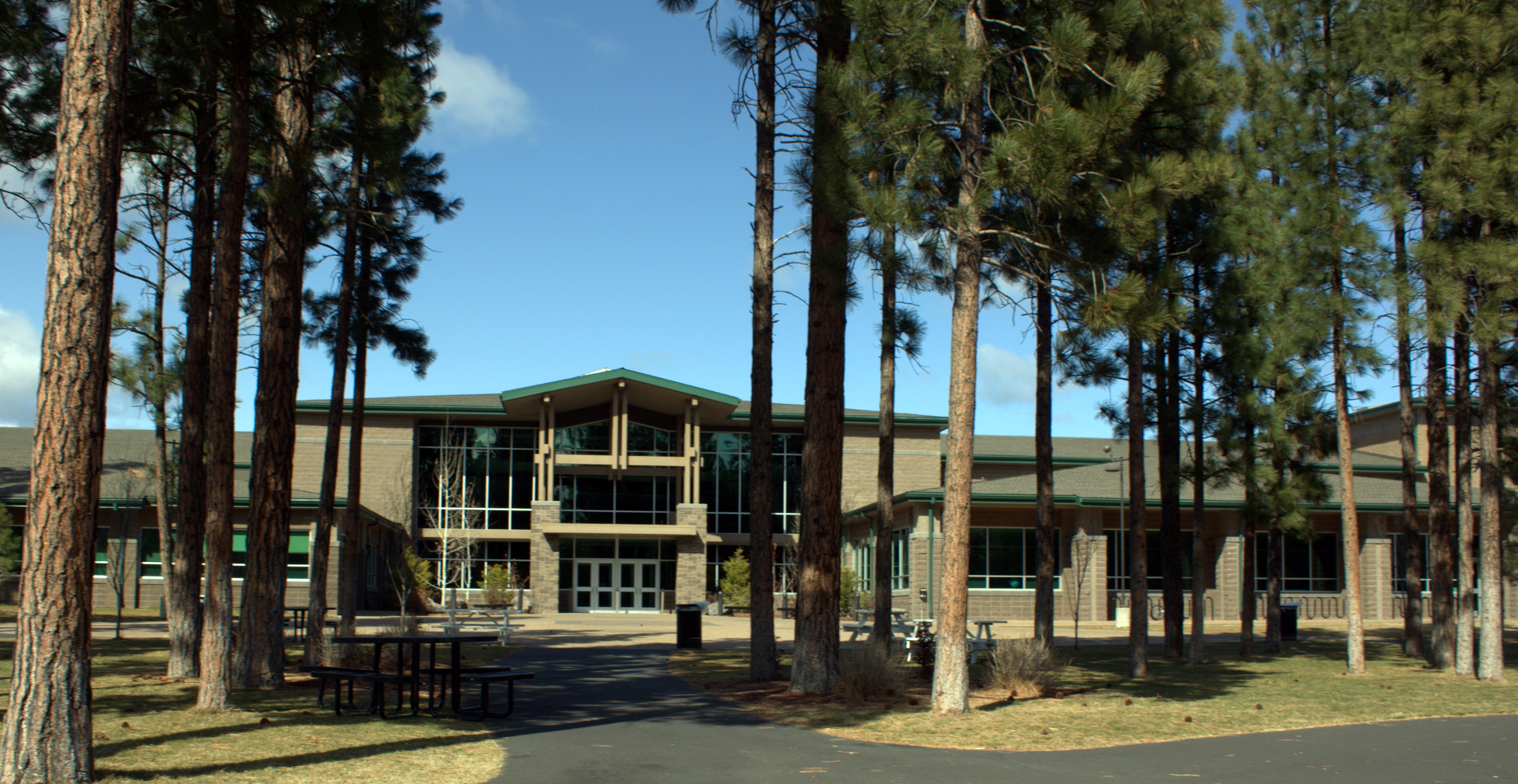
The current Sisters High School

Circa 1927, Sisters High School first opened.

Whether to close Sisters High School became a significant political issue in the mid-1960s. Four referendums were held on the issue on whether to close the high school. In the final one, in July 1967, 155 people voted in favor of the closure and 39 people voted against. Accordingly, the district began sending high school students to Redmond High School. At the time, 80 high school students lived in Sisters. The Redmond Spokesman argued the decision was correct, stating that the Sisters district had an insufficient tax base in keeping open the high school. The Bulletin of Bend, Oregon also argued that the decision was the correct one, due to insufficient funding.

By 1989 there was a significant increase of students, causing the district to have several options on how to deal with the issues.

In 1992 Sisters High School was to reopen, and it was to go in a junior and senior high school building opening that year. At the time, the number of students at Redmond High School was increasing. Sisters-based students who were scheduled to be in the 12th grade in the 1992–1993 school year could stay at Redmond High if they wished, and students scheduled to be in the 11th grade could have potentially done so if they argued that their academic progress would be hindered by switching schools. All students who were to be sophomores at that time were required to move to Sisters High.

In 2015, the superintendent, Jim Golden, took a new superintendent position at Greater Albany Public School District.

In 2023 a television studio at Sisters High School was built. The student body had significant input in the design and a role in the building of it. Weekly news reports began in 2024. In 2024 a class on audiovisual media, titled, "Outlaw Media," began to be in the course catalog.

The current Sisters Elementary facility opened in September 2024. The previous facility was converted into a recreation center.
