= Sisters High School (historic) =

- U.S. National Register of Historic Places
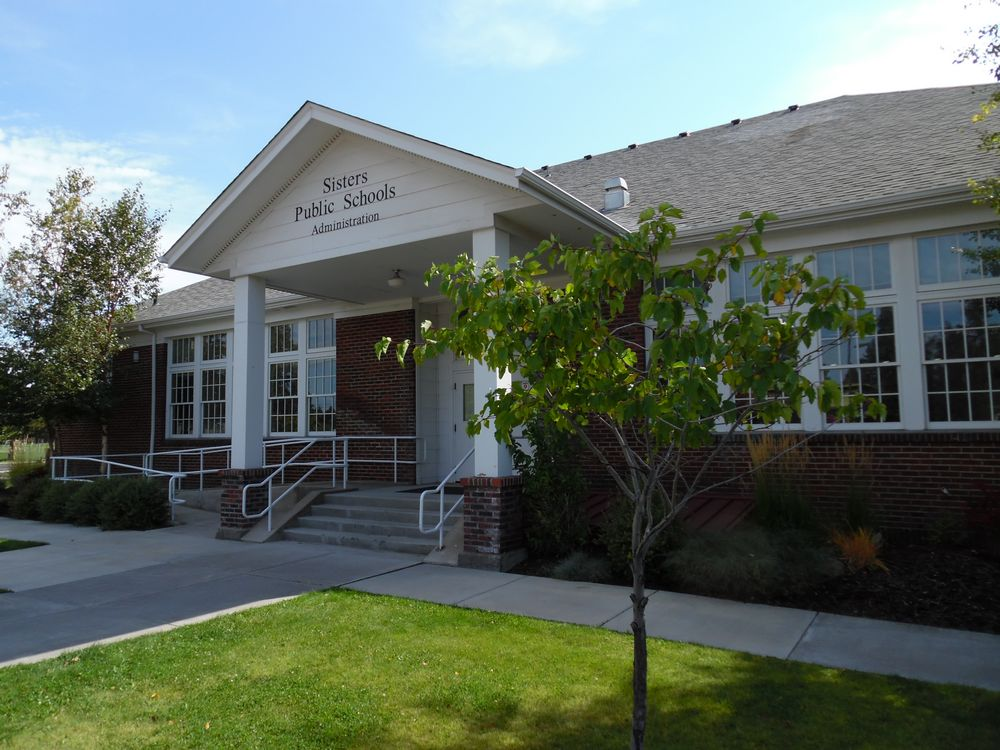
- The old high school is now an administration building

- Location within Oregon Location within the United States
- Location: 525 E Cascade Ave, Sisters, Oregon, 97759
- Coordinates: 44.29077°N 121.54428°W
- Built: 1939
- Architect: John Elwood Isted
- Architectural style: Colonial Revival
- NRHP reference No.: 06000095
- Added to NRHP: 2006

The historic Sisters High School (also known as the Old Sisters High School and the Sisters Public Schools Administration Building) was built in 1939 as a public secondary school for the community of Sisters in central Oregon. It was constructed using United States Federal Government funds provided through the Public Works Administration. The old Sisters High School was listed on National Register of Historic Places in 2006. Today, the facility has been converted into an administration building for the local school district, Sisters School District.

== History ==
The old Sisters High School is located in Sisters, a small community in Deschutes County, Oregon. The high school building has been an important landmark in the community since the 1930s. It replaced a school house built in 1912 that was used for all classes from first grade through high school.

The Sisters School District purchased property for the high school in 1938. The land was bought from the Oregon and Western Colonization Company, which owned unused right-of-way along U.S. Route 20. The 2-acre (0.81 ha) lot acquired for the high school is a triangular parcel of land on the southeast side of Sisters. It is bordered by Locust Street on the east and Cascade Avenue on the north with Route 20 running diagonally along the southwest side of the property.

The high school was built in 1939 as a Public Works Administration project, one of many public schools funded by the United States Federal Government during the Great Depression. It was financed with a Public Works Administration grant of $8,550 along with $14,000 in bonds issued by the Sisters School District. The high school's architectural style is Colonial Revival, a common design type for public schools constructed during the 1930s. The building was designed by John E. Isted, an architect from Bend, Oregon. The construction contract was won by O. C. Hart of Redmond, Oregon with a bid of $22,138. Hart began work on the building in late December 1938. The structure was completed in May 1939. It was furnished over the summer so it was ready to host classes in September 1939. The high school was officially opened on 6 September 1939 with 20 students enrolled.

The high school served the Sisters community until the 1960s, when the local tax base could no longer support an independent high school. In 1969, the Sisters School District closed the high school. Its 65 students were transferred to Redmond High School, approximately 20 miles (32 km) away. In 1973, a proposed bond measure to finance a new high school was defeated by voters, leaving approximately 60 high school students from Sisters to attend school in Redmond.

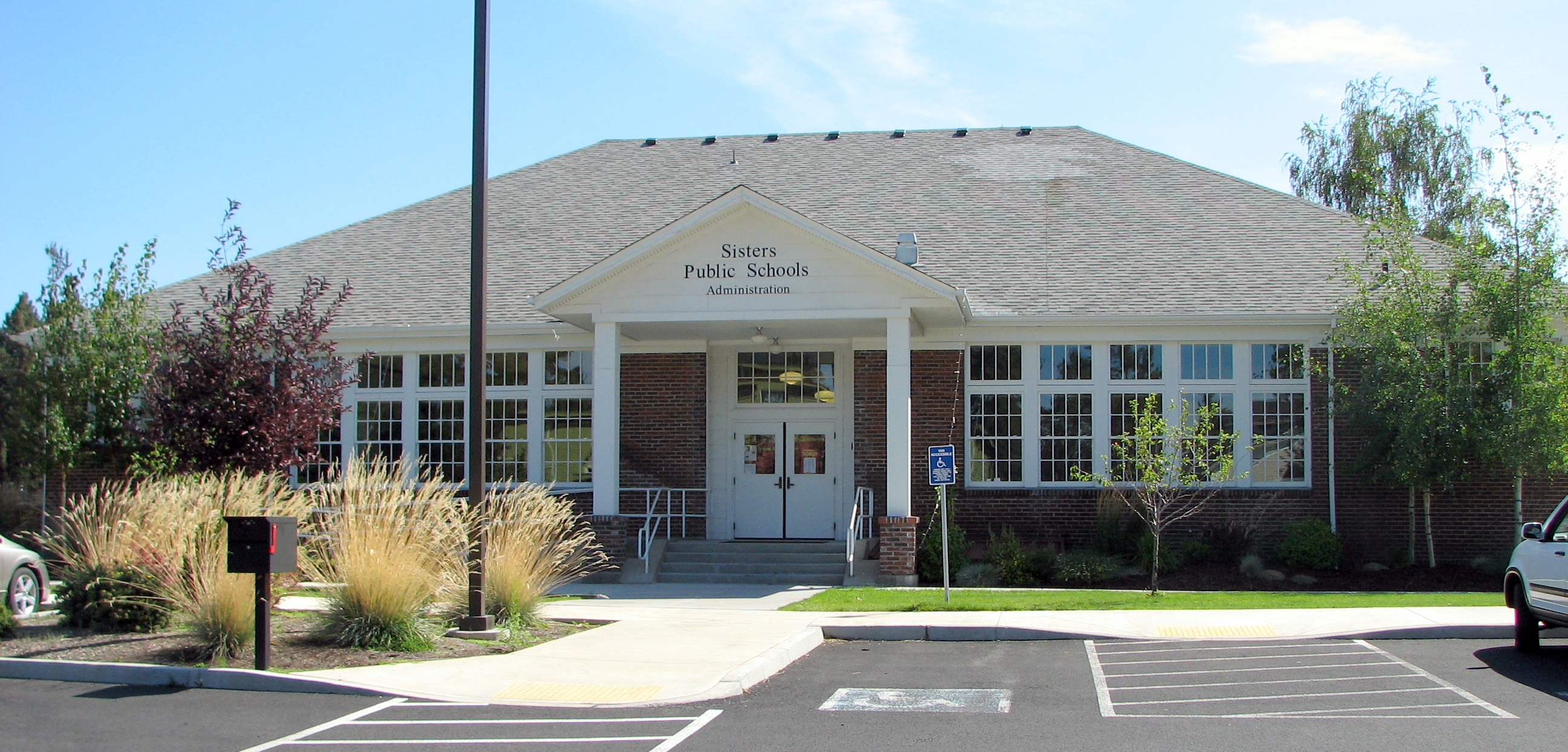
Restored school district administration building, 2009

After several decades of growth, the town of Sisters was able to financially support its own high school again. However, the old high school building was inadequate for the community's educational needs. As a result, the school district built a new high school which opened in 1992. In 2003, a newer high school was built and the facility built in 1992 was converting into a junior high school. The newest Sisters High School is located on the west side of town.

In 2005, the historic high school underwent a major renovation. The local school board financed the project by selling excess school district property. The renovation included preservation of wood paneling, school lockers, and drinking fountains as well as restoration of window frames and other exterior features. The project also converted the building into an administration office for the Sisters School District, keeping the historic character of the building while giving it a new economically viable purpose.

The renovation project was very successful in restoring and modernizing the structure of the building while maintaining its original character. Because of the building's importance to the Sisters community and its association with the Public Works Administration and the New Deal, the old Sisters High School was listed on the National Register of Historic Places in 2006.

== Structure ==
The exterior is a traditional Colonial Revival style façade. The building is one story high with a partial basement for utilities and storage. It has a rectangular footprint measuring 94 feet (29 m) east–west and 56 feet (17 m) north–south. The perimeter foundation is made of steel reinforced concrete. The structural walls are a steel-reinforced wooden frame with a textured red brick veneer exterior. This combination makes the structure extremely solid.

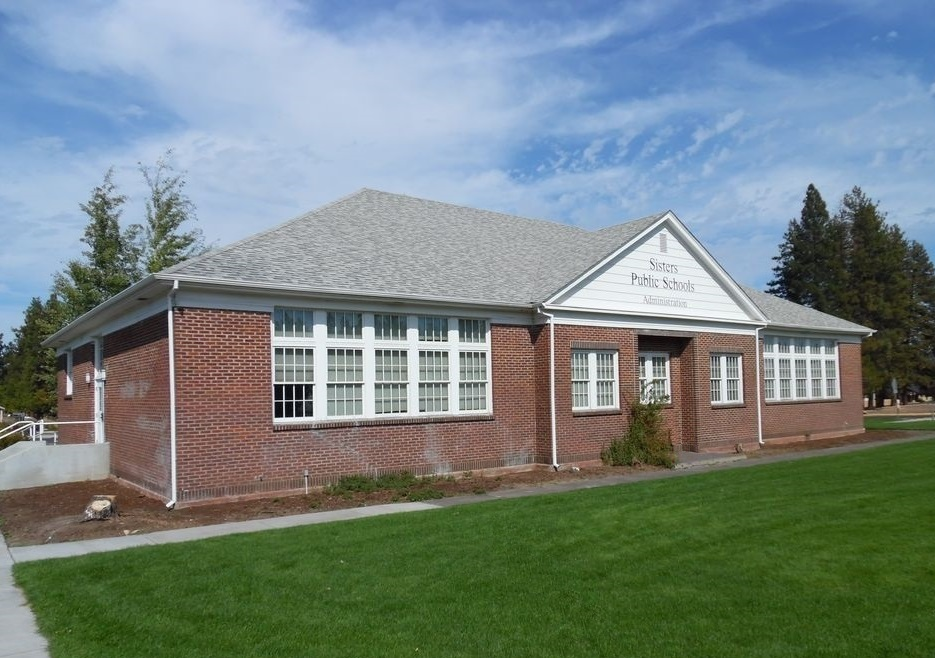
The rear façade, once the front of the building

The building has a hip roof with composition shingles. The peak of the roof is 31.5 feet (9.6 m) above ground level. There is a horizontal box cornice that runs along the roof eave. It serves as the top frame for the building's large windows. The windows are symmetrically places in sets of five in two main banks on the north and south sides of the building. There are also three sets of two windows on the south side below the gable where the original entrance was once located. All the windows are eight-over-eight double-hung wood sash windows. The four main window banks also have eight-pane awning windows above the eight-over-eight windows. There is a single pair of eight-over-eight windows near the north end on the east and west sides of the building. Both the east and west sides of the building have a double-door entrance with a fifteen-pane transom window above the doors.

The original pediment entrance was in the center of the south side of the building. However, that entrance was closed and covered with brick facing during the 2005 renovation. Also during that 2005 makeover a new main entrance was created in the center of the north façade where the external basement entrance was originally located. The new main entrance is a Colonial Revival style pediment portico with a clapboard covered gable end. It was carefully designed to be compatible with the historic character of the building.

== Interior ==
Inside the school, the interior rooms are set along both sides of a main hallway that runs the length of the building. The main corridor connects the double-door entrances on the east and west sides of the building. It is 8 feet (2.4 m) wide and lined with steel lockers on both sides of the hallway. There is also a multi-faucet drinking fountain located in the main hallway. The corridor has knotty pine paneling on the lower portion of the walls, framing the banks of lockers and classroom doors. Above the paneling, the walls are painted plaster. The main entrance joins the main hallway in the center of the building.

Originally, there were four classrooms, two on each side of the main corridor. Each classroom had two separate doors connecting to the main hallway. During the 2005 renovation, two of the classrooms were restored to their original configuration. Both of the classrooms are 29 by 22 feet (8.8 m × 6.7 m) long wide. The other two classrooms were divided up into individual work rooms and offices. All of the classrooms and offices have large windows designed to let in a maximum level of natural light. There are restrooms located off the main corridor at the northeast and northwest corners of the building. Each restroom has a pair of eight-over-eight double-hung windows. These windows are on the east and west sides of the building.

There are three offices that open onto the hallway across from the new main entrance. This is where the original entrance and foyer was located. The stairwell to the basement is also located in this area, just off the main hallway. The basement is much smaller than the first floor. It is a 41-by-20-foot (12.5 m × 6.1 m) space running perpendicular to the main hallway on the floor above. There are three small rooms off a basement hallway. One room is a vault; another is for electrical and mechanical equipment; and the third is for general storage. The rest of the space below the main floor is crawl space.

== See also ==
- National Register of Historic Places listings in Deschutes County, Oregon
