= New Hope Christian Fellowship =

Church in Hawaii, US

- Location: 290 Sand Island Access Rd., Honolulu, HI 96819
- Country: US
- Denomination: Pentecostal
- Website: www.enewhope.org

History
- Founded: 1995; 31 years ago
- Founder: Wayne Cordeiro

New Hope Christian Fellowship is a Pentecostal church based in Honolulu, Hawaii. It is affiliated with the Foursquare Church.

== Overview ==
The church was started by Pastor Wayne Cordeiro in 1996. It has planted more than 120 churches. In 2023 it has approximately 20,000 attendees each week across all 50 US states.

== History ==
Pastor Wayne Cordeiro (born on October 20, 1952, in Fort Belvoir, Virginia) and his wife Anna moved from Oregon to Hilo, Hawaii in 1983 and started a church in the Waiakea Villas area. It moved to the Hilo Women's Club and then to the Hilo Boys' and Girls' Club. In 1990, the "Gathering Place" facility was built, and the church grew to 2000.

In September 1995, Cordeiro and Anna moved to Honolulu to start New Hope. For seventeen years the church met in the auditorium of Farrington High School.

By 2005, the church had about 70 full and part-time staff and 1,500 volunteers.

On Friday, November 23, 2012, Farrington's auditorium roof collapsed during a heavy rainstorm. The incident caused New Hope to relocate its services. In 2013, the church moved to the New Hope Ministry Center.

=== Partnership with Farrington High School ===
In August 2013, three New Hope churches and two others were sued by a group alleging that the churches underpaid for the use of school facilities. The suit claimed that the five churches collectively underpaid by $5.6 million, of which New Hope Oahu alone was responsible for $3.2 million over the course of six years. The case was dismissed.

== Views ==
In 2013 New Hope Christian Fellowship was one of several Hawaiian churches to oppose a state law legalizing same-sex marriage.

== Affiliations ==
New Hope Christian College, formerly Eugene Bible College, is affiliated with the church and is located in Eugene, Oregon.

Kūlia Christian Academy is a pre-school ministry of New Hope Oahu.

New Hope Christian School is an elementary school at New Hope Leeward.

New Hope International is the leadership training and church planting arm of the church.

== New Hope in the 2020s ==
New Hope has more than 30 sites throughout Hawaii. The largest is New Hope Oahu.

In 2023 John Tilton is the senior pastor.
