= Sisters Eagle Airport =

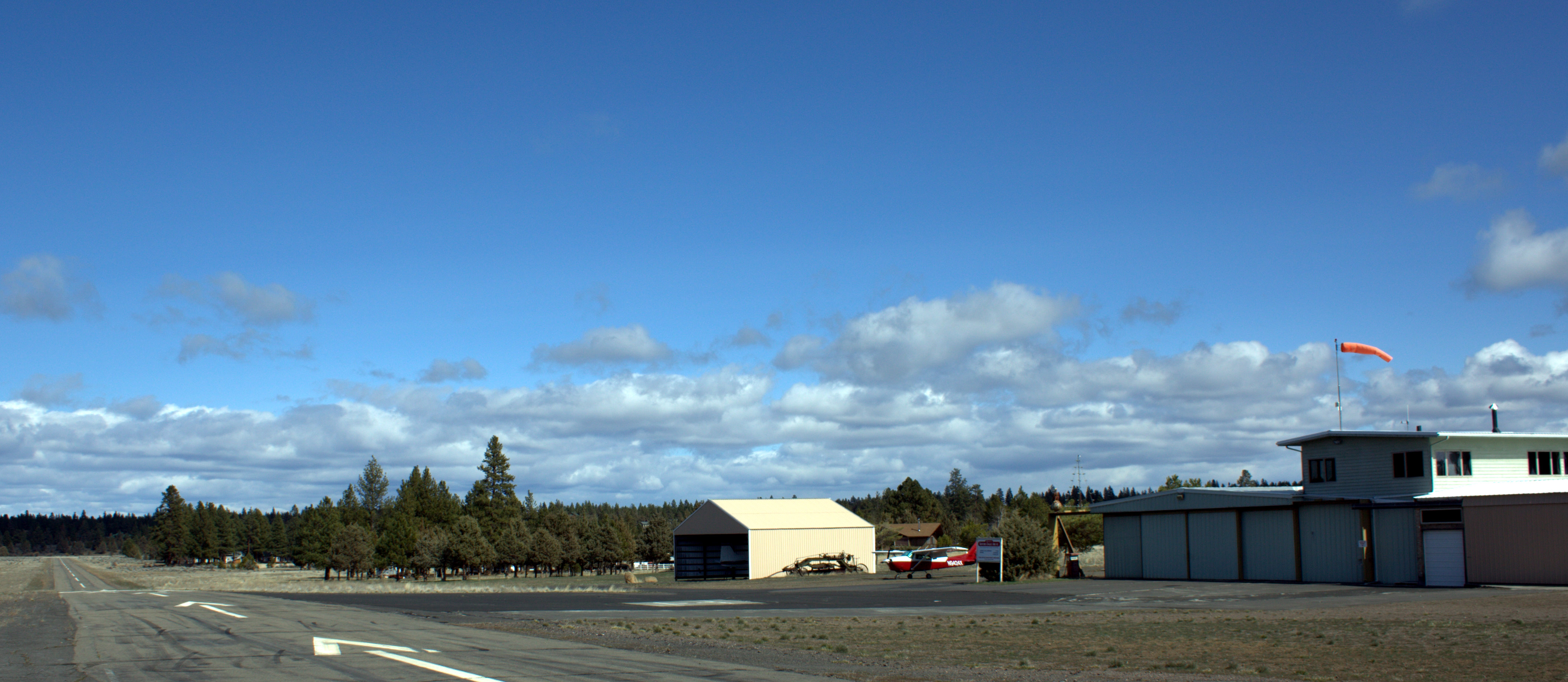
- IATA: none; ICAO: FAA: 6K5

Summary
- Airport type: Public
- Operator: Sisters Eagle Air, Inc.
- Location: Sisters, Oregon
- Elevation AMSL: 3,168 ft / 966 m
- Coordinates: 44°18′16.4160″N 121°32′21.16″W
- Interactive map of Sisters Eagle Airport

Runways
Direction	Length		Surface
Direction	ft	m	Surface
2/20	3,550	1,082	Asphalt

Sisters Eagle Airport (FAA LID: 6K5) is a public airport located one mile (1.6 km) north of Sisters in Deschutes County, Oregon, USA. There are some subdivisions with direct access to the airport. It is also used for wildfire aircraft support.
