= Nugget Newspaper =

Weekly newspaper published in Sisters, Oregon

- Type: Weekly Newspaper
- Owner(s): J. Louis Mullen and Tom Mullen
- Founder(s): Leonard Sundvall
- Editor: Jim Cornelius
- Founded: 1978
- Language: English
- Headquarters: Sisters, Oregon
- Circulation: 8,000
- OCLC number: 47982213
- Website: nuggetnews.com

The Nugget Newspaper is a weekly newspaper published in Sisters, Oregon, United States with a print readership of 12,100 and a circulation of 8,000. The online edition at nuggetnews.com claims a readership of 9,500 readers per month. The newspaper publishes a companion magazine annually, The Sisters Oregon Guide; its circulation is not listed. The Nugget is an associate member of the Oregon Newspaper Publishers Association.

== History ==
On March 1, 1978, the first issue of The Nugget was published in Sisters, Oregon. The community paper was founded by Leonard Sundvall, chairman of the Sisters Planning Commission and owner of a local hobby and toy shop. He planned to mail 1,000 free copies to nearby residents. That August, Sundvall sold the paper after operating it for about five months to Hull Platt Dolson, of Black Butte Ranch, and his wife Evelyn, both had no prior journalism experience. Sundvall, who was a licensed minister, said he sold the paper so he could focus more time on his spiritual work. Dolson died four years later and paper was inherited by his son Hull Eric Dolson and his spouse Kiki. In 2017, Kiki Dolson sold the Nugget to J. Louis Mullen and Tom Mullen, who own several newspapers in Wyoming and Washington.
