= Ruth MacLeod =

American writer

- Ruth MacLeod, from a 1964 newspaper.
- Born: Ruth Isabel Pickerill; December 29, 1903; Hanford, California, US
- Died: February 22, 1990 (aged 86); Fresno, California, US
- Other name: Ruth Derby (after first marriage)
- Occupation: Writer

Ruth Isabel MacLeod (née Pickerill; December 29, 1903 – February 22, 1990) was an American writer in the romance genre, especially in the subcategories of gothic and nurse romances.

== Early life ==
Ruth Pickerill was born in Hanford, California, the daughter of William Oscar Pickerill and Myrtle Sutton Pickerill. She attended Eugene Bible College in Oregon and studied creative writing at the University of California, Berkeley.

== Career ==
Ruth MacLeod wrote short stories to supplement her family's income during the Great Depression. She sold her first story in 1931. During World War II, she stopped writing and worked for the Civil Aeronautics Administration in Seattle. After the war, she returned to selling "true confession" stories to pulp magazines, and started writing novels in the medical romance and gothic subgenres. "The world is full of ideas," she explained in a 1966 interview, "and the more research you do, the more subjects you find." She also played piano and organ, and was active in church work.

== Personal life ==
Ruth Pickerill married Guy Herbert Derby; he died in 1953. She remarried to Horace MacLeod in 1954, and the couple lived in Arizona. She moved back to California when he died in 1964. She had three daughters and one son. Ruth MacLeod died in 1990, aged 86 years, at a hospital in Fresno. Her papers are archived at the University of Oregon.

== Selected bibliography ==
- Murder on Vacation (1962)
- A Nurse for Dr. Sterling (1962)
- Dr. Grayson's Crisis (1962)
- Waikiki Nurse (1963)
- Cheryl Downing: School Nurse (1964)
- Nurse Ann in Surgery (1965)
- Bitter Legacy (1966)
- Arlene Perry, Orthopedic Nurse (1966)
- Mistress of the Shadows (1967)
- Born to Be a Nurse (1969)
- A Love to Cherish (1969)
- Buenos Dias Teacher (1970)
- Mendocino Menace (1973)
- Make Way for Love (1973)
- Hawks of Glenaerie (1974)
