= Susan Hyde =

American political scientist

Susan D. Hyde is an American political scientist. Formerly teaching at Yale University, she is now a professor of political science at University of California, Berkeley. Her research focuses on international influences on domestic politics.

Her 2011 book, The Pseudo-Democrat's Dilemma: Why Election Observation Became an International Norm, won the International Studies Association's 2012 Chadwick Alger Prize, as well as the 2012 best book award by APSA's Comparative Democratization Section. She was awarded the 2019 Karl Deutsch Award by the International Studies Association.

She graduated as valedictorian from Sisters High School in 1996, where she was a three-sport athlete in track, cross country, and basketball. She obtained her bachelor's degree in 2000 from Linfield College and master's and doctorate degrees from the University of California, San Diego in 2006.
