= Charity Gaye Finnestad =

American author

Charity Gaye Finnestad (born June 30, 1973) is an American author known for her blog Hollywood in Heels that ran from April 2007 to April 2008. It documented her adventures living and dating in Hollywood. The blog became the eponymous book. Hollywood in Heels was released digitally in April 2012 and published in hardcover on September 3, 2013.

== Early life ==
Finnestad was born on June 30, 1973, in Bellingham, Washington, to Chris and Betty Finnestad. Growing up, she moved with her family to Omaha, Nebraska; Seattle, Washington; British Columbia; Greely, Colorado; and finally Sisters, Oregon, where she attended secondary school. In 1994, Finnestad graduated summa cum laude from Eugene Bible College (now New Hope Christian College) with a degree in religion and education. She is the oldest of four children.

== Career ==
She worked for several years in modeling and odd jobs. Hollywood in Heels was her first public writing. She later wrote the book version. In April 2012, the digital release of Hollywood in Heels was noted by Perez Hilton, Life and Style magazine, and Nylon. Skyhorse Publishing released the hardcover format on September 3, 2013.

== Personal life ==
In 2002, Finnestad moved to Los Angeles to write professionally. On January 8, 2008 in San Francisco, Finnestad married Robert Henry Kondrk. Kondrk was VP of Content for Apple's iTunes.

The couple lives in Sherman Oaks with their sons, Talbot and Theo Kondrk.
