= Small Farmer's Journal =

The Small Farmer's Journal is a large (11 × 14 inch) quarterly magazine published by a family-owned business in Sisters, Oregon since 1976. The publication covers agriculture as well as general topics including rural life and humor. Lynn Miller was the publisher and editor of the magazine in 2013 when the number of the subscribers was nearly 20,000.
